= List of minor planets: 531001–532000 =

The following is a partial list of minor planets, running from minor-planet number 531001 through 532000, inclusive. The primary data for this and other partial lists is based on JPL's "Small-Body Orbital Elements" and data available from the Minor Planet Center. Critical list information is also provided by the MPC, unless otherwise specified from Lowell Observatory. A detailed description of the table's columns and additional sources are given on the main page including a complete list of every page in this series, and a statistical break-up on the dynamical classification of minor planets.

Also see the summary list of all named bodies in numerical and alphabetical order, and the corresponding naming citations for the number range of this particular list. New namings may only be added to this list after official publication, as the preannouncement of names is condemned by the Working Group for Small Bodies Nomenclature of the International Astronomical Union.

| Near-Earth obj. | MBA (inner) | MBA (outer) | Centaur |
| Mars-crosser | MBA (middle) | Jupiter trojan | Trans-Neptunian obj. |
| Unclassified |

== 531001–531100 ==
| Designation | | | Discovery | | | Properties | | Ref |
| Permanent | Provisional | Named after | Date | Site | Discoverer(s) | Category | Diam. | Ref |
|---|---|---|---|---|---|---|---|---|
| 531001 | 2012 BM_{119} | — | December 27, 2011 | Mount Lemmon | Mount Lemmon Survey | · | 570 m | MPC · JPL |
| 531002 | 2012 BO_{119} | — | January 27, 2012 | Mount Lemmon | Mount Lemmon Survey | NYS | 810 m | MPC · JPL |
| 531003 | 2012 BT_{124} | — | September 13, 2007 | Mount Lemmon | Mount Lemmon Survey | · | 550 m | MPC · JPL |
| 531004 | 2012 BT_{125} | — | January 20, 2012 | Kitt Peak | Spacewatch | · | 550 m | MPC · JPL |
| 531005 | 2012 BP_{126} | — | March 10, 2005 | Mount Lemmon | Mount Lemmon Survey | · | 760 m | MPC · JPL |
| 531006 | 2012 BL_{127} | — | February 9, 2005 | Mount Lemmon | Mount Lemmon Survey | · | 750 m | MPC · JPL |
| 531007 | 2012 BZ_{134} | — | December 26, 2011 | Mount Lemmon | Mount Lemmon Survey | H | 430 m | MPC · JPL |
| 531008 | 2012 BF_{137} | — | March 3, 2005 | Kitt Peak | Spacewatch | · | 690 m | MPC · JPL |
| 531009 | 2012 BG_{137} | — | January 26, 2012 | Mount Lemmon | Mount Lemmon Survey | · | 670 m | MPC · JPL |
| 531010 | 2012 BS_{137} | — | January 4, 2012 | Mount Lemmon | Mount Lemmon Survey | (2076) | 550 m | MPC · JPL |
| 531011 | 2012 BD_{142} | — | January 25, 2012 | Haleakala | Pan-STARRS 1 | · | 490 m | MPC · JPL |
| 531012 | 2012 BT_{143} | — | January 25, 2012 | Kitt Peak | Spacewatch | · | 570 m | MPC · JPL |
| 531013 | 2012 BG_{149} | — | December 2, 2004 | Kitt Peak | Spacewatch | · | 850 m | MPC · JPL |
| 531014 | 2012 BH_{151} | — | September 3, 2007 | Mount Lemmon | Mount Lemmon Survey | PHO | 800 m | MPC · JPL |
| 531015 | 2012 BX_{154} | — | January 21, 2012 | Haleakala | Pan-STARRS 1 | SDO | 200 km | MPC · JPL |
| 531016 | 2012 BZ_{154} | — | January 24, 2012 | Haleakala | Pan-STARRS 1 | SDO | 143 km | MPC · JPL |
| 531017 | 2012 BA_{155} | — | January 25, 2012 | Haleakala | Pan-STARRS 1 | res · 2:5 | 230 km | MPC · JPL |
| 531018 | 2012 BF_{156} | — | January 19, 2012 | Haleakala | Pan-STARRS 1 | AGN | 980 m | MPC · JPL |
| 531019 | 2012 BM_{159} | — | January 18, 2012 | Catalina | CSS | PHO | 740 m | MPC · JPL |
| 531020 | 2012 BN_{159} | — | January 19, 2012 | Kitt Peak | Spacewatch | · | 730 m | MPC · JPL |
| 531021 | 2012 BO_{159} | — | January 20, 2012 | Kitt Peak | Spacewatch | · | 1.0 km | MPC · JPL |
| 531022 | 2012 BQ_{159} | — | January 27, 2012 | Kitt Peak | Spacewatch | · | 700 m | MPC · JPL |
| 531023 | 2012 BW_{159} | — | January 26, 2012 | Mount Lemmon | Mount Lemmon Survey | · | 730 m | MPC · JPL |
| 531024 | 2012 BX_{159} | — | January 26, 2012 | Haleakala | Pan-STARRS 1 | · | 810 m | MPC · JPL |
| 531025 | 2012 CM | — | March 10, 2005 | Kitt Peak | Spacewatch | · | 850 m | MPC · JPL |
| 531026 | 2012 CZ_{2} | — | January 19, 2012 | Haleakala | Pan-STARRS 1 | · | 4.3 km | MPC · JPL |
| 531027 | 2012 CK_{10} | — | October 9, 2007 | Kitt Peak | Spacewatch | · | 670 m | MPC · JPL |
| 531028 | 2012 CM_{11} | — | January 27, 2012 | Kitt Peak | Spacewatch | · | 540 m | MPC · JPL |
| 531029 | 2012 CK_{13} | — | January 25, 2012 | Kitt Peak | Spacewatch | · | 920 m | MPC · JPL |
| 531030 | 2012 CZ_{13} | — | January 21, 2012 | Kitt Peak | Spacewatch | · | 750 m | MPC · JPL |
| 531031 | 2012 CL_{14} | — | November 2, 2007 | Mount Lemmon | Mount Lemmon Survey | · | 660 m | MPC · JPL |
| 531032 | 2012 CL_{21} | — | January 19, 2012 | Haleakala | Pan-STARRS 1 | MAS | 740 m | MPC · JPL |
| 531033 | 2012 CJ_{28} | — | January 12, 2008 | Mount Lemmon | Mount Lemmon Survey | · | 830 m | MPC · JPL |
| 531034 | 2012 CO_{40} | — | February 1, 2005 | Kitt Peak | Spacewatch | · | 740 m | MPC · JPL |
| 531035 | 2012 CN_{43} | — | January 26, 2012 | Mount Lemmon | Mount Lemmon Survey | · | 780 m | MPC · JPL |
| 531036 | 2012 CV_{48} | — | April 16, 2005 | Kitt Peak | Spacewatch | · | 950 m | MPC · JPL |
| 531037 | 2012 CM_{50} | — | March 4, 2005 | Kitt Peak | Spacewatch | · | 700 m | MPC · JPL |
| 531038 | 2012 CZ_{54} | — | January 19, 2012 | Mount Lemmon | Mount Lemmon Survey | H | 510 m | MPC · JPL |
| 531039 | 2012 CJ_{57} | — | September 13, 2010 | La Sagra | OAM | · | 2.2 km | MPC · JPL |
| 531040 | 2012 CS_{57} | — | February 3, 2012 | Haleakala | Pan-STARRS 1 | cubewano (hot) | 249 km | MPC · JPL |
| 531041 | 2012 CW_{57} | — | January 27, 2007 | Mount Lemmon | Mount Lemmon Survey | H | 310 m | MPC · JPL |
| 531042 | 2012 CO_{58} | — | February 3, 2012 | Haleakala | Pan-STARRS 1 | · | 2.9 km | MPC · JPL |
| 531043 | 2012 CK_{59} | — | February 3, 2012 | Haleakala | Pan-STARRS 1 | · | 460 m | MPC · JPL |
| 531044 | 2012 CO_{59} | — | February 1, 2012 | Mount Lemmon | Mount Lemmon Survey | · | 700 m | MPC · JPL |
| 531045 | 2012 CT_{59} | — | November 15, 2007 | Catalina | CSS | · | 750 m | MPC · JPL |
| 531046 | 2012 DC_{3} | — | January 29, 2012 | Kitt Peak | Spacewatch | · | 1.1 km | MPC · JPL |
| 531047 | 2012 DH_{5} | — | April 11, 2005 | Mount Lemmon | Mount Lemmon Survey | · | 730 m | MPC · JPL |
| 531048 | 2012 DS_{5} | — | February 10, 2008 | Mount Lemmon | Mount Lemmon Survey | · | 1.2 km | MPC · JPL |
| 531049 | 2012 DU_{8} | — | January 19, 2012 | Haleakala | Pan-STARRS 1 | · | 1.0 km | MPC · JPL |
| 531050 | 2012 DX_{8} | — | March 9, 2005 | Mount Lemmon | Mount Lemmon Survey | · | 670 m | MPC · JPL |
| 531051 | 2012 DC_{26} | — | February 24, 2008 | Mount Lemmon | Mount Lemmon Survey | ERI | 1.3 km | MPC · JPL |
| 531052 | 2012 DA_{35} | — | February 24, 2012 | Kitt Peak | Spacewatch | · | 870 m | MPC · JPL |
| 531053 | 2012 DC_{37} | — | February 25, 2012 | Kitt Peak | Spacewatch | · | 570 m | MPC · JPL |
| 531054 | 2012 DH_{40} | — | October 9, 2007 | Mount Lemmon | Mount Lemmon Survey | · | 790 m | MPC · JPL |
| 531055 | 2012 DV_{44} | — | February 24, 2012 | Kitt Peak | Spacewatch | · | 1.2 km | MPC · JPL |
| 531056 | 2012 DK_{46} | — | September 21, 2009 | Mount Lemmon | Mount Lemmon Survey | · | 1.8 km | MPC · JPL |
| 531057 | 2012 DK_{47} | — | February 12, 2008 | Kitt Peak | Spacewatch | · | 1.3 km | MPC · JPL |
| 531058 | 2012 DT_{48} | — | January 18, 2012 | Kitt Peak | Spacewatch | · | 980 m | MPC · JPL |
| 531059 | 2012 DJ_{60} | — | March 1, 2008 | Kitt Peak | Spacewatch | · | 1.7 km | MPC · JPL |
| 531060 | 2012 DJ_{61} | — | February 28, 2012 | Haleakala | Pan-STARRS 1 | ATE · PHA | 370 m | MPC · JPL |
| 531061 | 2012 DN_{68} | — | January 21, 2012 | Kitt Peak | Spacewatch | · | 570 m | MPC · JPL |
| 531062 | 2012 DV_{68} | — | March 9, 2005 | Mount Lemmon | Mount Lemmon Survey | · | 730 m | MPC · JPL |
| 531063 | 2012 DP_{69} | — | August 27, 2006 | Kitt Peak | Spacewatch | NYS | 810 m | MPC · JPL |
| 531064 | 2012 DQ_{74} | — | March 11, 2005 | Kitt Peak | Spacewatch | · | 750 m | MPC · JPL |
| 531065 | 2012 DD_{77} | — | February 28, 2012 | Haleakala | Pan-STARRS 1 | V | 420 m | MPC · JPL |
| 531066 | 2012 DQ_{77} | — | July 20, 2010 | WISE | WISE | PHO | 920 m | MPC · JPL |
| 531067 | 2012 DJ_{80} | — | January 30, 2012 | Kitt Peak | Spacewatch | · | 620 m | MPC · JPL |
| 531068 | 2012 DR_{81} | — | February 26, 2012 | Haleakala | Pan-STARRS 1 | · | 1.4 km | MPC · JPL |
| 531069 | 2012 DN_{84} | — | January 19, 2012 | Haleakala | Pan-STARRS 1 | CYB | 3.3 km | MPC · JPL |
| 531070 | 2012 DG_{86} | — | February 25, 2012 | Catalina | CSS | BAR | 1.3 km | MPC · JPL |
| 531071 | 2012 DD_{90} | — | March 11, 2005 | Catalina | CSS | · | 570 m | MPC · JPL |
| 531072 | 2012 DP_{91} | — | November 3, 2007 | Mount Lemmon | Mount Lemmon Survey | · | 480 m | MPC · JPL |
| 531073 | 2012 DR_{92} | — | January 18, 2008 | Kitt Peak | Spacewatch | · | 860 m | MPC · JPL |
| 531074 | 2012 DX_{98} | — | February 27, 2012 | Haleakala | Pan-STARRS 1 | twotino | 128 km | MPC · JPL |
| 531075 | 2012 DY_{98} | — | February 26, 2012 | Haleakala | Pan-STARRS 1 | SDO | 133 km | MPC · JPL |
| 531076 | 2012 DA_{99} | — | February 28, 2012 | Haleakala | Pan-STARRS 1 | cubewano (cold) | 147 km | MPC · JPL |
| 531077 | 2012 DB_{99} | — | February 28, 2012 | Haleakala | Pan-STARRS 1 | plutino | 259 km | MPC · JPL |
| 531078 | 2012 DK_{99} | — | February 27, 2012 | Haleakala | Pan-STARRS 1 | H | 450 m | MPC · JPL |
| 531079 | 2012 DL_{99} | — | February 21, 2012 | Kitt Peak | Spacewatch | H | 450 m | MPC · JPL |
| 531080 | 2012 DZ_{99} | — | April 2, 2005 | Mount Lemmon | Mount Lemmon Survey | MAS | 550 m | MPC · JPL |
| 531081 | 2012 DE_{100} | — | January 18, 2008 | Kitt Peak | Spacewatch | · | 1.0 km | MPC · JPL |
| 531082 | 2012 DF_{100} | — | February 27, 2012 | Haleakala | Pan-STARRS 1 | · | 1.5 km | MPC · JPL |
| 531083 | 2012 DU_{100} | — | April 26, 2000 | Kitt Peak | Spacewatch | · | 1.5 km | MPC · JPL |
| 531084 | 2012 DW_{100} | — | February 18, 2008 | Mount Lemmon | Mount Lemmon Survey | PHO | 910 m | MPC · JPL |
| 531085 | 2012 DS_{101} | — | September 29, 2010 | Mount Lemmon | Mount Lemmon Survey | · | 590 m | MPC · JPL |
| 531086 | 2012 DT_{102} | — | February 23, 2012 | Mount Lemmon | Mount Lemmon Survey | MAS | 530 m | MPC · JPL |
| 531087 | 2012 DD_{103} | — | October 14, 2007 | Mount Lemmon | Mount Lemmon Survey | · | 670 m | MPC · JPL |
| 531088 | 2012 DU_{103} | — | February 14, 2005 | Kitt Peak | Spacewatch | · | 590 m | MPC · JPL |
| 531089 | 2012 DC_{104} | — | February 27, 2012 | Haleakala | Pan-STARRS 1 | · | 1.6 km | MPC · JPL |
| 531090 | 2012 DP_{104} | — | February 27, 2012 | Haleakala | Pan-STARRS 1 | · | 810 m | MPC · JPL |
| 531091 | 2012 DY_{104} | — | February 28, 2012 | Haleakala | Pan-STARRS 1 | · | 530 m | MPC · JPL |
| 531092 | 2012 DF_{105} | — | October 2, 2006 | Mount Lemmon | Mount Lemmon Survey | · | 1.1 km | MPC · JPL |
| 531093 | 2012 DM_{105} | — | January 11, 2008 | Kitt Peak | Spacewatch | V | 600 m | MPC · JPL |
| 531094 | 2012 DQ_{105} | — | February 28, 2012 | Haleakala | Pan-STARRS 1 | · | 560 m | MPC · JPL |
| 531095 | 2012 DW_{105} | — | January 14, 2008 | Kitt Peak | Spacewatch | NYS | 850 m | MPC · JPL |
| 531096 | 2012 DC_{106} | — | February 28, 2012 | Haleakala | Pan-STARRS 1 | V | 370 m | MPC · JPL |
| 531097 | 2012 DD_{106} | — | November 6, 1996 | Kitt Peak | Spacewatch | V | 610 m | MPC · JPL |
| 531098 | 2012 DO_{106} | — | September 16, 2010 | Mount Lemmon | Mount Lemmon Survey | · | 800 m | MPC · JPL |
| 531099 | 2012 DP_{106} | — | February 27, 2012 | Haleakala | Pan-STARRS 1 | · | 650 m | MPC · JPL |
| 531100 | 2012 ED_{2} | — | March 17, 2005 | Mount Lemmon | Mount Lemmon Survey | · | 1.0 km | MPC · JPL |

== 531101–531200 ==
back to top

| Designation | | | Discovery | | | Properties | | Ref |
| Permanent | Provisional | Named after | Date | Site | Discoverer(s) | Category | Diam. | Ref |
|---|---|---|---|---|---|---|---|---|
| 531101 | 2012 EQ_{8} | — | January 10, 2008 | Mount Lemmon | Mount Lemmon Survey | · | 830 m | MPC · JPL |
| 531102 | 2012 EF_{9} | — | February 26, 2012 | Mount Lemmon | Mount Lemmon Survey | PHO | 620 m | MPC · JPL |
| 531103 | 2012 EQ_{9} | — | March 13, 2012 | Mount Lemmon | Mount Lemmon Survey | H | 560 m | MPC · JPL |
| 531104 | 2012 EN_{12} | — | February 10, 2008 | Kitt Peak | Spacewatch | PHO | 810 m | MPC · JPL |
| 531105 | 2012 EC_{15} | — | May 10, 2005 | Socorro | LINEAR | · | 680 m | MPC · JPL |
| 531106 | 2012 ES_{16} | — | May 8, 2005 | Kitt Peak | Spacewatch | V | 680 m | MPC · JPL |
| 531107 | 2012 EQ_{18} | — | March 13, 2012 | Mount Lemmon | Mount Lemmon Survey | H | 470 m | MPC · JPL |
| 531108 | 2012 EY_{18} | — | March 13, 2012 | Mount Lemmon | Mount Lemmon Survey | · | 570 m | MPC · JPL |
| 531109 | 2012 EG_{19} | — | March 4, 2012 | Mount Lemmon | Mount Lemmon Survey | · | 2.1 km | MPC · JPL |
| 531110 | 2012 EJ_{19} | — | March 1, 2012 | Mount Lemmon | Mount Lemmon Survey | · | 760 m | MPC · JPL |
| 531111 | 2012 ES_{19} | — | March 14, 2012 | Mount Lemmon | Mount Lemmon Survey | · | 1.7 km | MPC · JPL |
| 531112 | 2012 EW_{19} | — | March 15, 2012 | Kitt Peak | Spacewatch | · | 1.4 km | MPC · JPL |
| 531113 | 2012 EB_{20} | — | March 15, 2012 | Mount Lemmon | Mount Lemmon Survey | · | 1.2 km | MPC · JPL |
| 531114 | 2012 FG_{4} | — | March 1, 2012 | Mount Lemmon | Mount Lemmon Survey | · | 980 m | MPC · JPL |
| 531115 | 2012 FF_{5} | — | February 24, 2012 | Haleakala | Pan-STARRS 1 | · | 620 m | MPC · JPL |
| 531116 | 2012 FR_{7} | — | February 2, 2005 | Kitt Peak | Spacewatch | · | 460 m | MPC · JPL |
| 531117 | 2012 FN_{9} | — | February 19, 2012 | Kitt Peak | Spacewatch | · | 880 m | MPC · JPL |
| 531118 | 2012 FP_{10} | — | February 27, 2012 | Haleakala | Pan-STARRS 1 | · | 1.5 km | MPC · JPL |
| 531119 | 2012 FF_{11} | — | January 12, 2008 | Kitt Peak | Spacewatch | · | 920 m | MPC · JPL |
| 531120 | 2012 FK_{18} | — | March 13, 2012 | Mount Lemmon | Mount Lemmon Survey | 3:2 · SHU | 4.1 km | MPC · JPL |
| 531121 | 2012 FY_{28} | — | March 11, 2005 | Kitt Peak | Spacewatch | · | 610 m | MPC · JPL |
| 531122 | 2012 FG_{31} | — | November 6, 2010 | Mount Lemmon | Mount Lemmon Survey | (2076) | 740 m | MPC · JPL |
| 531123 | 2012 FG_{32} | — | February 21, 2012 | Mount Lemmon | Mount Lemmon Survey | H | 520 m | MPC · JPL |
| 531124 | 2012 FT_{34} | — | February 1, 2008 | Mount Lemmon | Mount Lemmon Survey | · | 1 km | MPC · JPL |
| 531125 | 2012 FE_{35} | — | August 19, 2009 | Kitt Peak | Spacewatch | · | 1.6 km | MPC · JPL |
| 531126 | 2012 FG_{38} | — | March 25, 2012 | Kitt Peak | Spacewatch | · | 1.5 km | MPC · JPL |
| 531127 | 2012 FN_{38} | — | December 16, 2007 | Kitt Peak | Spacewatch | · | 800 m | MPC · JPL |
| 531128 | 2012 FY_{44} | — | February 27, 2012 | Haleakala | Pan-STARRS 1 | H | 440 m | MPC · JPL |
| 531129 | 2012 FR_{45} | — | March 8, 2005 | Mount Lemmon | Mount Lemmon Survey | · | 670 m | MPC · JPL |
| 531130 | 2012 FO_{49} | — | March 15, 2004 | Kitt Peak | Spacewatch | 3:2 · SHU | 4.0 km | MPC · JPL |
| 531131 | 2012 FO_{61} | — | March 28, 2012 | Mount Lemmon | Mount Lemmon Survey | H | 360 m | MPC · JPL |
| 531132 | 2012 FG_{64} | — | April 2, 2005 | Mount Lemmon | Mount Lemmon Survey | NYS | 700 m | MPC · JPL |
| 531133 | 2012 FU_{64} | — | March 21, 2012 | Mount Lemmon | Mount Lemmon Survey | · | 1.7 km | MPC · JPL |
| 531134 | 2012 FP_{70} | — | March 29, 2012 | Haleakala | Pan-STARRS 1 | · | 1.5 km | MPC · JPL |
| 531135 | 2012 FR_{70} | — | February 27, 2012 | Haleakala | Pan-STARRS 1 | · | 2.0 km | MPC · JPL |
| 531136 | 2012 FY_{70} | — | December 31, 2007 | Mount Lemmon | Mount Lemmon Survey | MAS | 630 m | MPC · JPL |
| 531137 | 2012 FR_{71} | — | March 15, 2008 | Mount Lemmon | Mount Lemmon Survey | ADE | 2.0 km | MPC · JPL |
| 531138 | 2012 FU_{71} | — | March 28, 2012 | Haleakala | Pan-STARRS 1 | · | 1.5 km | MPC · JPL |
| 531139 | 2012 FS_{77} | — | March 21, 2012 | Catalina | CSS | · | 910 m | MPC · JPL |
| 531140 | 2012 FW_{78} | — | March 27, 2012 | Mayhill | L. Elenin | · | 1.8 km | MPC · JPL |
| 531141 | 2012 FK_{84} | — | March 29, 2012 | Haleakala | Pan-STARRS 1 | cubewano (hot) | 239 km | MPC · JPL |
| 531142 | 2012 FL_{84} | — | March 29, 2012 | Haleakala | Pan-STARRS 1 | SDO | 166 km | MPC · JPL |
| 531143 | 2012 FA_{85} | — | January 30, 2008 | Mount Lemmon | Mount Lemmon Survey | MAS | 660 m | MPC · JPL |
| 531144 | 2012 FM_{85} | — | March 27, 2012 | Kitt Peak | Spacewatch | · | 1.6 km | MPC · JPL |
| 531145 | 2012 FM_{86} | — | April 3, 2008 | Mount Lemmon | Mount Lemmon Survey | · | 1.8 km | MPC · JPL |
| 531146 | 2012 FW_{86} | — | March 16, 2005 | Mount Lemmon | Mount Lemmon Survey | · | 570 m | MPC · JPL |
| 531147 | 2012 FA_{87} | — | March 28, 2012 | Kitt Peak | Spacewatch | V | 560 m | MPC · JPL |
| 531148 | 2012 FH_{87} | — | March 16, 2012 | Mount Lemmon | Mount Lemmon Survey | V | 470 m | MPC · JPL |
| 531149 | 2012 FJ_{87} | — | March 24, 2012 | Kitt Peak | Spacewatch | NYS | 1.1 km | MPC · JPL |
| 531150 | 2012 GF | — | February 1, 2012 | Mount Lemmon | Mount Lemmon Survey | · | 410 m | MPC · JPL |
| 531151 | 2012 GE_{2} | — | March 28, 2012 | Kitt Peak | Spacewatch | H | 520 m | MPC · JPL |
| 531152 | 2012 GW_{2} | — | March 4, 2012 | Mount Lemmon | Mount Lemmon Survey | · | 1.1 km | MPC · JPL |
| 531153 | 2012 GG_{3} | — | February 11, 2008 | Mount Lemmon | Mount Lemmon Survey | MAS | 650 m | MPC · JPL |
| 531154 | 2012 GD_{7} | — | January 19, 2008 | Mount Lemmon | Mount Lemmon Survey | ERI | 1.4 km | MPC · JPL |
| 531155 | 2012 GH_{7} | — | February 24, 2008 | Mount Lemmon | Mount Lemmon Survey | NYS | 870 m | MPC · JPL |
| 531156 | 2012 GE_{8} | — | November 30, 2003 | Kitt Peak | Spacewatch | · | 840 m | MPC · JPL |
| 531157 | 2012 GH_{11} | — | October 12, 2010 | Catalina | CSS | H | 420 m | MPC · JPL |
| 531158 | 2012 GG_{13} | — | March 23, 2012 | Catalina | CSS | PHO | 800 m | MPC · JPL |
| 531159 | 2012 GB_{16} | — | January 28, 2006 | Catalina | CSS | · | 2.4 km | MPC · JPL |
| 531160 | 2012 GG_{17} | — | April 15, 2012 | Haleakala | Pan-STARRS 1 | · | 740 m | MPC · JPL |
| 531161 | 2012 GJ_{17} | — | March 27, 2012 | Mount Lemmon | Mount Lemmon Survey | · | 1.7 km | MPC · JPL |
| 531162 | 2012 GC_{19} | — | February 12, 2008 | Kitt Peak | Spacewatch | MAS | 600 m | MPC · JPL |
| 531163 | 2012 GB_{20} | — | March 28, 2012 | Kitt Peak | Spacewatch | · | 1.2 km | MPC · JPL |
| 531164 | 2012 GL_{22} | — | March 27, 2012 | Mount Lemmon | Mount Lemmon Survey | · | 820 m | MPC · JPL |
| 531165 | 2012 GQ_{25} | — | January 5, 2012 | Haleakala | Pan-STARRS 1 | · | 640 m | MPC · JPL |
| 531166 | 2012 GB_{26} | — | February 10, 2011 | Mount Lemmon | Mount Lemmon Survey | 3:2 | 4.2 km | MPC · JPL |
| 531167 | 2012 GK_{26} | — | March 14, 2012 | Kitt Peak | Spacewatch | · | 1.0 km | MPC · JPL |
| 531168 | 2012 GR_{28} | — | November 22, 2009 | Mount Lemmon | Mount Lemmon Survey | · | 1.8 km | MPC · JPL |
| 531169 | 2012 GH_{29} | — | February 11, 2008 | Kitt Peak | Spacewatch | · | 800 m | MPC · JPL |
| 531170 | 2012 GD_{32} | — | November 14, 2010 | Mount Lemmon | Mount Lemmon Survey | · | 780 m | MPC · JPL |
| 531171 | 2012 GE_{32} | — | December 18, 2007 | Kitt Peak | Spacewatch | NYS | 620 m | MPC · JPL |
| 531172 | 2012 GX_{33} | — | March 15, 2012 | Haleakala | Pan-STARRS 1 | · | 2.0 km | MPC · JPL |
| 531173 | 2012 GQ_{34} | — | January 15, 2008 | Mount Lemmon | Mount Lemmon Survey | · | 900 m | MPC · JPL |
| 531174 | 2012 GS_{36} | — | April 15, 2012 | Haleakala | Pan-STARRS 1 | · | 1.7 km | MPC · JPL |
| 531175 | 2012 GZ_{37} | — | April 15, 2012 | Haleakala | Pan-STARRS 1 | · | 610 m | MPC · JPL |
| 531176 | 2012 GG_{38} | — | April 15, 2012 | Catalina | CSS | · | 1.1 km | MPC · JPL |
| 531177 | 2012 GG_{39} | — | October 25, 2003 | Kitt Peak | Spacewatch | · | 1.2 km | MPC · JPL |
| 531178 | 2012 GD_{40} | — | March 26, 2012 | Mount Lemmon | Mount Lemmon Survey | · | 640 m | MPC · JPL |
| 531179 | 2012 GZ_{40} | — | October 11, 2010 | Mount Lemmon | Mount Lemmon Survey | H | 460 m | MPC · JPL |
| 531180 | 2012 GD_{41} | — | December 9, 2010 | Mount Lemmon | Mount Lemmon Survey | · | 1.8 km | MPC · JPL |
| 531181 | 2012 GE_{41} | — | April 1, 2012 | Mount Lemmon | Mount Lemmon Survey | · | 2.1 km | MPC · JPL |
| 531182 | 2012 GQ_{41} | — | April 15, 2012 | Haleakala | Pan-STARRS 1 | H | 320 m | MPC · JPL |
| 531183 | 2012 GS_{41} | — | April 15, 2012 | Haleakala | Pan-STARRS 1 | · | 1.1 km | MPC · JPL |
| 531184 | 2012 HB | — | October 7, 2010 | Catalina | CSS | H | 560 m | MPC · JPL |
| 531185 | 2012 HD | — | March 15, 2012 | Kitt Peak | Spacewatch | H | 440 m | MPC · JPL |
| 531186 | 2012 HZ_{5} | — | April 17, 2012 | Kitt Peak | Spacewatch | EUN | 1.3 km | MPC · JPL |
| 531187 | 2012 HU_{6} | — | March 23, 2012 | Kitt Peak | Spacewatch | H | 590 m | MPC · JPL |
| 531188 | 2012 HE_{7} | — | April 4, 2005 | Mount Lemmon | Mount Lemmon Survey | · | 770 m | MPC · JPL |
| 531189 | 2012 HU_{13} | — | November 18, 2008 | Kitt Peak | Spacewatch | H | 360 m | MPC · JPL |
| 531190 | 2012 HW_{15} | — | April 25, 2007 | Kitt Peak | Spacewatch | H | 440 m | MPC · JPL |
| 531191 | 2012 HK_{17} | — | April 21, 2012 | Mount Lemmon | Mount Lemmon Survey | · | 590 m | MPC · JPL |
| 531192 | 2012 HV_{20} | — | April 25, 2012 | Mount Lemmon | Mount Lemmon Survey | H | 440 m | MPC · JPL |
| 531193 | 2012 HX_{21} | — | March 27, 2012 | Mount Lemmon | Mount Lemmon Survey | · | 2.1 km | MPC · JPL |
| 531194 | 2012 HG_{26} | — | April 23, 2012 | Kitt Peak | Spacewatch | · | 970 m | MPC · JPL |
| 531195 | 2012 HM_{26} | — | March 28, 2012 | Mount Lemmon | Mount Lemmon Survey | MAS | 580 m | MPC · JPL |
| 531196 | 2012 HA_{27} | — | April 12, 2008 | Catalina | CSS | · | 2.1 km | MPC · JPL |
| 531197 | 2012 HM_{28} | — | December 19, 2007 | Mount Lemmon | Mount Lemmon Survey | · | 1.1 km | MPC · JPL |
| 531198 | 2012 HF_{29} | — | February 8, 2008 | Kitt Peak | Spacewatch | NYS | 990 m | MPC · JPL |
| 531199 | 2012 HT_{29} | — | April 24, 2012 | Catalina | CSS | · | 2.2 km | MPC · JPL |
| 531200 | 2012 HA_{31} | — | April 13, 2004 | Kitt Peak | Spacewatch | H | 420 m | MPC · JPL |

== 531201–531300 ==
back to top

| Designation | | | Discovery | | | Properties | | Ref |
| Permanent | Provisional | Named after | Date | Site | Discoverer(s) | Category | Diam. | Ref |
|---|---|---|---|---|---|---|---|---|
| 531201 | 2012 HT_{31} | — | March 16, 2012 | Kitt Peak | Spacewatch | NYS | 780 m | MPC · JPL |
| 531202 | 2012 HA_{35} | — | March 4, 2012 | Mount Lemmon | Mount Lemmon Survey | · | 710 m | MPC · JPL |
| 531203 | 2012 HX_{37} | — | April 15, 2012 | Haleakala | Pan-STARRS 1 | · | 1.5 km | MPC · JPL |
| 531204 | 2012 HT_{46} | — | November 20, 2009 | La Sagra | OAM | · | 2.7 km | MPC · JPL |
| 531205 | 2012 HX_{51} | — | March 17, 2005 | Mount Lemmon | Mount Lemmon Survey | PHO | 720 m | MPC · JPL |
| 531206 | 2012 HW_{52} | — | April 27, 2012 | Haleakala | Pan-STARRS 1 | · | 1.7 km | MPC · JPL |
| 531207 | 2012 HQ_{54} | — | January 2, 2012 | Mount Lemmon | Mount Lemmon Survey | · | 770 m | MPC · JPL |
| 531208 | 2012 HO_{55} | — | March 15, 2012 | Haleakala | Pan-STARRS 1 | H | 530 m | MPC · JPL |
| 531209 | 2012 HW_{56} | — | January 18, 2008 | Kitt Peak | Spacewatch | · | 880 m | MPC · JPL |
| 531210 | 2012 HR_{57} | — | March 8, 2008 | Mount Lemmon | Mount Lemmon Survey | · | 1.0 km | MPC · JPL |
| 531211 | 2012 HN_{58} | — | April 8, 2003 | Kitt Peak | Spacewatch | · | 1.7 km | MPC · JPL |
| 531212 | 2012 HD_{61} | — | April 19, 2012 | Mount Lemmon | Mount Lemmon Survey | · | 1.5 km | MPC · JPL |
| 531213 | 2012 HO_{64} | — | March 29, 2012 | Kitt Peak | Spacewatch | · | 1.7 km | MPC · JPL |
| 531214 | 2012 HV_{65} | — | January 3, 2012 | Mount Lemmon | Mount Lemmon Survey | · | 1.7 km | MPC · JPL |
| 531215 | 2012 HE_{71} | — | April 24, 2012 | Mount Lemmon | Mount Lemmon Survey | NYS | 670 m | MPC · JPL |
| 531216 | 2012 HU_{74} | — | November 22, 2005 | Catalina | CSS | H | 590 m | MPC · JPL |
| 531217 | 2012 HO_{76} | — | November 10, 2010 | Mount Lemmon | Mount Lemmon Survey | · | 770 m | MPC · JPL |
| 531218 | 2012 HY_{78} | — | April 21, 2012 | Mount Lemmon | Mount Lemmon Survey | · | 1.3 km | MPC · JPL |
| 531219 | 2012 HJ_{80} | — | April 28, 2012 | Kitt Peak | Spacewatch | · | 1.9 km | MPC · JPL |
| 531220 | 2012 HF_{81} | — | April 21, 2012 | Mount Lemmon | Mount Lemmon Survey | · | 800 m | MPC · JPL |
| 531221 | 2012 HL_{82} | — | April 24, 2012 | Haleakala | Pan-STARRS 1 | · | 760 m | MPC · JPL |
| 531222 | 2012 HE_{83} | — | January 11, 2008 | Mount Lemmon | Mount Lemmon Survey | PHO | 590 m | MPC · JPL |
| 531223 | 2012 HE_{84} | — | March 21, 2009 | Mount Lemmon | Mount Lemmon Survey | H | 550 m | MPC · JPL |
| 531224 | 2012 HK_{85} | — | April 27, 2012 | Haleakala | Pan-STARRS 1 | SDO | 162 km | MPC · JPL |
| 531225 | 2012 HM_{85} | — | February 28, 2008 | Mount Lemmon | Mount Lemmon Survey | · | 980 m | MPC · JPL |
| 531226 | 2012 HX_{85} | — | February 9, 2008 | Kitt Peak | Spacewatch | MAS | 720 m | MPC · JPL |
| 531227 | 2012 HH_{86} | — | April 19, 2012 | Mount Lemmon | Mount Lemmon Survey | · | 1.0 km | MPC · JPL |
| 531228 | 2012 HE_{87} | — | April 29, 2012 | Kitt Peak | Spacewatch | V | 580 m | MPC · JPL |
| 531229 | 2012 HH_{87} | — | April 30, 2012 | Kitt Peak | Spacewatch | · | 1.6 km | MPC · JPL |
| 531230 | 2012 HJ_{87} | — | April 19, 2012 | Mount Lemmon | Mount Lemmon Survey | · | 670 m | MPC · JPL |
| 531231 | 2012 HP_{87} | — | April 19, 2012 | Mount Lemmon | Mount Lemmon Survey | · | 1.2 km | MPC · JPL |
| 531232 | 2012 HS_{87} | — | April 27, 2012 | Haleakala | Pan-STARRS 1 | · | 920 m | MPC · JPL |
| 531233 | 2012 JH | — | May 9, 2012 | Haleakala | Pan-STARRS 1 | H | 470 m | MPC · JPL |
| 531234 | 2012 JU_{1} | — | April 18, 2012 | Kitt Peak | Spacewatch | H | 360 m | MPC · JPL |
| 531235 | 2012 JJ_{2} | — | April 27, 2012 | Haleakala | Pan-STARRS 1 | · | 740 m | MPC · JPL |
| 531236 | 2012 JN_{3} | — | April 11, 2005 | Mount Lemmon | Mount Lemmon Survey | · | 530 m | MPC · JPL |
| 531237 | 2012 JP_{3} | — | February 8, 2008 | Kitt Peak | Spacewatch | · | 920 m | MPC · JPL |
| 531238 | 2012 JS_{5} | — | March 6, 2011 | Mount Lemmon | Mount Lemmon Survey | · | 2.2 km | MPC · JPL |
| 531239 | 2012 JJ_{7} | — | May 12, 2012 | Mount Lemmon | Mount Lemmon Survey | · | 1.1 km | MPC · JPL |
| 531240 | 2012 JY_{7} | — | March 5, 2008 | Mount Lemmon | Mount Lemmon Survey | · | 770 m | MPC · JPL |
| 531241 | 2012 JX_{13} | — | October 28, 2006 | Mount Lemmon | Mount Lemmon Survey | · | 1.0 km | MPC · JPL |
| 531242 | 2012 JT_{18} | — | November 28, 2010 | Mount Lemmon | Mount Lemmon Survey | H | 480 m | MPC · JPL |
| 531243 | 2012 JV_{19} | — | May 1, 2012 | Mount Lemmon | Mount Lemmon Survey | HNS | 1.2 km | MPC · JPL |
| 531244 | 2012 JG_{21} | — | April 16, 2012 | Catalina | CSS | · | 1.8 km | MPC · JPL |
| 531245 | 2012 JG_{33} | — | April 7, 2008 | Kitt Peak | Spacewatch | · | 1.1 km | MPC · JPL |
| 531246 | 2012 JN_{33} | — | February 9, 2008 | Mount Lemmon | Mount Lemmon Survey | · | 770 m | MPC · JPL |
| 531247 | 2012 JB_{35} | — | March 9, 2008 | Mount Lemmon | Mount Lemmon Survey | · | 820 m | MPC · JPL |
| 531248 | 2012 JP_{35} | — | May 15, 2012 | Haleakala | Pan-STARRS 1 | H | 500 m | MPC · JPL |
| 531249 | 2012 JP_{40} | — | April 27, 2012 | Haleakala | Pan-STARRS 1 | H | 440 m | MPC · JPL |
| 531250 | 2012 JB_{42} | — | February 7, 2011 | Mount Lemmon | Mount Lemmon Survey | · | 2.1 km | MPC · JPL |
| 531251 | 2012 JE_{42} | — | March 16, 2012 | Mount Lemmon | Mount Lemmon Survey | · | 2.7 km | MPC · JPL |
| 531252 | 2012 JF_{47} | — | May 14, 2012 | Catalina | CSS | H | 660 m | MPC · JPL |
| 531253 | 2012 JM_{67} | — | May 12, 2012 | Mount Lemmon | Mount Lemmon Survey | T_{j} (2.94) · 3:2 | 5.2 km | MPC · JPL |
| 531254 | 2012 JP_{67} | — | February 3, 2000 | Kitt Peak | Spacewatch | · | 1.1 km | MPC · JPL |
| 531255 | 2012 JA_{68} | — | May 10, 2012 | Siding Spring | SSS | · | 1.5 km | MPC · JPL |
| 531256 | 2012 JC_{68} | — | May 14, 2012 | Haleakala | Pan-STARRS 1 | · | 1.0 km | MPC · JPL |
| 531257 | 2012 KC | — | April 25, 2012 | Mount Lemmon | Mount Lemmon Survey | H | 390 m | MPC · JPL |
| 531258 | 2012 KS_{7} | — | November 29, 2010 | Kitt Peak | Spacewatch | H | 360 m | MPC · JPL |
| 531259 | 2012 KJ_{9} | — | May 19, 2012 | Haleakala | Pan-STARRS 1 | H | 600 m | MPC · JPL |
| 531260 | 2012 KL_{9} | — | May 26, 2007 | Mount Lemmon | Mount Lemmon Survey | H | 330 m | MPC · JPL |
| 531261 | 2012 KD_{14} | — | April 1, 2012 | Mount Lemmon | Mount Lemmon Survey | · | 2.2 km | MPC · JPL |
| 531262 | 2012 KZ_{15} | — | April 15, 2012 | Haleakala | Pan-STARRS 1 | PHO | 910 m | MPC · JPL |
| 531263 | 2012 KX_{18} | — | May 15, 2009 | Mount Lemmon | Mount Lemmon Survey | H | 480 m | MPC · JPL |
| 531264 | 2012 KX_{20} | — | March 29, 2012 | Kitt Peak | Spacewatch | · | 1.8 km | MPC · JPL |
| 531265 | 2012 KD_{24} | — | May 14, 2012 | Haleakala | Pan-STARRS 1 | DOR | 2.0 km | MPC · JPL |
| 531266 | 2012 KX_{39} | — | April 27, 2012 | Haleakala | Pan-STARRS 1 | · | 600 m | MPC · JPL |
| 531267 | 2012 KO_{40} | — | February 25, 2007 | Kitt Peak | Spacewatch | · | 1.4 km | MPC · JPL |
| 531268 | 2012 KA_{44} | — | May 21, 2012 | Haleakala | Pan-STARRS 1 | · | 1.7 km | MPC · JPL |
| 531269 | 2012 KX_{48} | — | April 8, 2008 | Kitt Peak | Spacewatch | NYS | 960 m | MPC · JPL |
| 531270 | 2012 KU_{52} | — | May 31, 2012 | Mount Lemmon | Mount Lemmon Survey | MAR | 1.1 km | MPC · JPL |
| 531271 | 2012 LL_{16} | — | May 16, 2012 | Haleakala | Pan-STARRS 1 | H | 460 m | MPC · JPL |
| 531272 | 2012 LL_{21} | — | April 8, 2008 | Mount Lemmon | Mount Lemmon Survey | NYS | 1.0 km | MPC · JPL |
| 531273 | 2012 LG_{25} | — | June 15, 2012 | Mount Lemmon | Mount Lemmon Survey | NYS | 1.0 km | MPC · JPL |
| 531274 | 2012 LH_{26} | — | May 21, 2012 | Haleakala | Pan-STARRS 1 | · | 1.7 km | MPC · JPL |
| 531275 | 2012 MU_{4} | — | December 15, 2001 | Socorro | LINEAR | · | 3.4 km | MPC · JPL |
| 531276 | 2012 MW_{5} | — | May 30, 2012 | Mount Lemmon | Mount Lemmon Survey | · | 2.7 km | MPC · JPL |
| 531277 | 2012 MM_{11} | — | June 24, 2012 | Socorro | LINEAR | APO · PHA | 310 m | MPC · JPL |
| 531278 | 2012 MG_{14} | — | April 8, 2006 | Mount Lemmon | Mount Lemmon Survey | KOR | 1.6 km | MPC · JPL |
| 531279 | 2012 MN_{16} | — | June 16, 2012 | Haleakala | Pan-STARRS 1 | H | 530 m | MPC · JPL |
| 531280 | 2012 MT_{16} | — | December 5, 2005 | Kitt Peak | Spacewatch | · | 1.4 km | MPC · JPL |
| 531281 | 2012 NK | — | June 19, 2012 | Kitt Peak | Spacewatch | EUN | 1.1 km | MPC · JPL |
| 531282 | 2012 ND_{1} | — | September 5, 2007 | Catalina | CSS | H | 630 m | MPC · JPL |
| 531283 | 2012 OU_{3} | — | March 30, 2011 | Haleakala | Pan-STARRS 1 | MAR | 1.4 km | MPC · JPL |
| 531284 | 2012 OV_{3} | — | May 21, 2006 | Kitt Peak | Spacewatch | · | 2.0 km | MPC · JPL |
| 531285 | 2012 OD_{4} | — | May 1, 2006 | Kitt Peak | Spacewatch | · | 2.0 km | MPC · JPL |
| 531286 | 2012 OR_{4} | — | November 5, 2010 | Kitt Peak | Spacewatch | H | 650 m | MPC · JPL |
| 531287 | 2012 OF_{5} | — | July 28, 2012 | Haleakala | Pan-STARRS 1 | · | 1.3 km | MPC · JPL |
| 531288 | 2012 PW_{2} | — | February 4, 2011 | Catalina | CSS | H | 500 m | MPC · JPL |
| 531289 | 2012 PL_{4} | — | August 8, 2012 | Haleakala | Pan-STARRS 1 | H | 400 m | MPC · JPL |
| 531290 | 2012 PV_{4} | — | February 17, 2004 | Kitt Peak | Spacewatch | · | 3.8 km | MPC · JPL |
| 531291 | 2012 PB_{8} | — | August 8, 2012 | Haleakala | Pan-STARRS 1 | EOS | 2.0 km | MPC · JPL |
| 531292 | 2012 PD_{8} | — | January 10, 2011 | Mount Lemmon | Mount Lemmon Survey | H | 500 m | MPC · JPL |
| 531293 | 2012 PE_{8} | — | August 8, 2012 | Haleakala | Pan-STARRS 1 | · | 2.5 km | MPC · JPL |
| 531294 | 2012 PQ_{10} | — | August 9, 2012 | Haleakala | Pan-STARRS 1 | · | 2.5 km | MPC · JPL |
| 531295 | 2012 PB_{13} | — | September 26, 2006 | Kitt Peak | Spacewatch | · | 2.7 km | MPC · JPL |
| 531296 | 2012 PS_{14} | — | November 2, 2007 | Mount Lemmon | Mount Lemmon Survey | · | 1.8 km | MPC · JPL |
| 531297 | 2012 PN_{17} | — | May 20, 2012 | Mount Lemmon | Mount Lemmon Survey | H | 560 m | MPC · JPL |
| 531298 | 2012 PA_{19} | — | April 6, 2010 | WISE | WISE | · | 1.8 km | MPC · JPL |
| 531299 | 2012 PM_{21} | — | August 6, 2012 | Haleakala | Pan-STARRS 1 | · | 2.4 km | MPC · JPL |
| 531300 | 2012 PJ_{26} | — | August 6, 2012 | Haleakala | Pan-STARRS 1 | · | 2.2 km | MPC · JPL |

== 531301–531400 ==
back to top

| Designation | | | Discovery | | | Properties | | Ref |
| Permanent | Provisional | Named after | Date | Site | Discoverer(s) | Category | Diam. | Ref |
|---|---|---|---|---|---|---|---|---|
| 531301 | 2012 PT_{27} | — | August 14, 2012 | Haleakala | Pan-STARRS 1 | · | 960 m | MPC · JPL |
| 531302 | 2012 PX_{32} | — | July 19, 2012 | Siding Spring | SSS | · | 1.6 km | MPC · JPL |
| 531303 | 2012 PP_{33} | — | October 9, 2007 | Catalina | CSS | · | 4.6 km | MPC · JPL |
| 531304 | 2012 PU_{34} | — | January 7, 2006 | Kitt Peak | Spacewatch | H | 570 m | MPC · JPL |
| 531305 | 2012 PJ_{36} | — | December 22, 2008 | Kitt Peak | Spacewatch | · | 2.5 km | MPC · JPL |
| 531306 | 2012 PB_{43} | — | August 14, 2012 | Haleakala | Pan-STARRS 1 | VER | 3.0 km | MPC · JPL |
| 531307 | 2012 PT_{43} | — | March 13, 2005 | Kitt Peak | Spacewatch | · | 2.6 km | MPC · JPL |
| 531308 | 2012 PR_{44} | — | August 14, 2012 | Haleakala | Pan-STARRS 1 | EOS | 1.6 km | MPC · JPL |
| 531309 | 2012 PV_{44} | — | August 13, 2012 | Kitt Peak | Spacewatch | · | 2.7 km | MPC · JPL |
| 531310 | 2012 PX_{44} | — | September 28, 2003 | Kitt Peak | Spacewatch | · | 2.1 km | MPC · JPL |
| 531311 | 2012 PF_{45} | — | March 19, 2010 | Mount Lemmon | Mount Lemmon Survey | · | 2.6 km | MPC · JPL |
| 531312 | 2012 PL_{45} | — | August 11, 2012 | Siding Spring | SSS | · | 2.0 km | MPC · JPL |
| 531313 | 2012 PO_{45} | — | August 14, 2012 | Haleakala | Pan-STARRS 1 | · | 2.1 km | MPC · JPL |
| 531314 | 2012 PP_{45} | — | July 18, 2007 | Mount Lemmon | Mount Lemmon Survey | H | 490 m | MPC · JPL |
| 531315 | 2012 PS_{45} | — | August 13, 2012 | Haleakala | Pan-STARRS 1 | EOS | 1.5 km | MPC · JPL |
| 531316 | 2012 PT_{45} | — | January 28, 2009 | Catalina | CSS | · | 5.3 km | MPC · JPL |
| 531317 | 2012 QN | — | September 13, 2007 | Mount Lemmon | Mount Lemmon Survey | · | 2.7 km | MPC · JPL |
| 531318 | 2012 QR | — | May 29, 2012 | Mount Lemmon | Mount Lemmon Survey | T_{j} (2.97) | 3.8 km | MPC · JPL |
| 531319 | 2012 QZ | — | January 3, 2009 | Mount Lemmon | Mount Lemmon Survey | EOS | 1.9 km | MPC · JPL |
| 531320 | 2012 QF_{7} | — | August 17, 2012 | Haleakala | Pan-STARRS 1 | HNS | 1.5 km | MPC · JPL |
| 531321 | 2012 QV_{14} | — | August 22, 2012 | La Sagra | OAM | · | 3.9 km | MPC · JPL |
| 531322 | 2012 QY_{15} | — | March 12, 2007 | Kitt Peak | Spacewatch | · | 980 m | MPC · JPL |
| 531323 | 2012 QQ_{18} | — | June 5, 2010 | WISE | WISE | · | 2.0 km | MPC · JPL |
| 531324 | 2012 QE_{19} | — | August 6, 2012 | Haleakala | Pan-STARRS 1 | · | 2.0 km | MPC · JPL |
| 531325 | 2012 QQ_{21} | — | August 14, 2012 | Kitt Peak | Spacewatch | · | 990 m | MPC · JPL |
| 531326 | 2012 QT_{21} | — | October 12, 2007 | Mount Lemmon | Mount Lemmon Survey | · | 2.2 km | MPC · JPL |
| 531327 | 2012 QH_{22} | — | August 24, 2012 | Kitt Peak | Spacewatch | L5 | 6.4 km | MPC · JPL |
| 531328 | 2012 QU_{27} | — | August 24, 2012 | Kitt Peak | Spacewatch | · | 2.2 km | MPC · JPL |
| 531329 | 2012 QQ_{32} | — | February 5, 2009 | Kitt Peak | Spacewatch | VER | 2.3 km | MPC · JPL |
| 531330 | 2012 QT_{44} | — | June 21, 2012 | Mount Lemmon | Mount Lemmon Survey | H | 430 m | MPC · JPL |
| 531331 | 2012 QW_{47} | — | August 17, 2012 | Haleakala | Pan-STARRS 1 | EOS | 1.6 km | MPC · JPL |
| 531332 | 2012 QL_{52} | — | October 3, 2013 | Haleakala | Pan-STARRS 1 | L5 | 5.9 km | MPC · JPL |
| 531333 | 2012 QP_{52} | — | August 16, 2012 | Haleakala | Pan-STARRS 1 | · | 2.4 km | MPC · JPL |
| 531334 | 2012 QT_{52} | — | October 23, 1997 | Kitt Peak | Spacewatch | KOR | 1.4 km | MPC · JPL |
| 531335 | 2012 QU_{52} | — | September 9, 2007 | Mount Lemmon | Mount Lemmon Survey | · | 1.6 km | MPC · JPL |
| 531336 | 2012 QX_{52} | — | September 29, 2003 | Kitt Peak | Spacewatch | HOF | 2.3 km | MPC · JPL |
| 531337 | 2012 QK_{53} | — | August 25, 2012 | Haleakala | Pan-STARRS 1 | · | 2.9 km | MPC · JPL |
| 531338 | 2012 QM_{53} | — | August 25, 2012 | Haleakala | Pan-STARRS 1 | · | 2.3 km | MPC · JPL |
| 531339 | 2012 QD_{54} | — | October 22, 2008 | Mount Lemmon | Mount Lemmon Survey | · | 1.6 km | MPC · JPL |
| 531340 | 2012 QL_{54} | — | August 26, 2012 | Kitt Peak | Spacewatch | EOS | 1.5 km | MPC · JPL |
| 531341 | 2012 QN_{54} | — | August 26, 2012 | Haleakala | Pan-STARRS 1 | EOS | 1.6 km | MPC · JPL |
| 531342 | 2012 QO_{54} | — | August 26, 2012 | Haleakala | Pan-STARRS 1 | · | 2.8 km | MPC · JPL |
| 531343 | 2012 RE | — | July 18, 2012 | Catalina | CSS | H | 550 m | MPC · JPL |
| 531344 | 2012 RR | — | October 15, 2001 | Socorro | LINEAR | · | 3.0 km | MPC · JPL |
| 531345 | 2012 RR_{1} | — | October 9, 2007 | Kitt Peak | Spacewatch | · | 2.2 km | MPC · JPL |
| 531346 | 2012 RY_{1} | — | December 9, 2010 | Mount Lemmon | Mount Lemmon Survey | H | 550 m | MPC · JPL |
| 531347 | 2012 RK_{5} | — | August 14, 2012 | Kitt Peak | Spacewatch | · | 2.4 km | MPC · JPL |
| 531348 | 2012 RJ_{6} | — | August 28, 2012 | Mount Lemmon | Mount Lemmon Survey | · | 2.5 km | MPC · JPL |
| 531349 | 2012 RE_{8} | — | August 25, 2012 | Haleakala | Pan-STARRS 1 | TIR | 2.8 km | MPC · JPL |
| 531350 | 2012 RV_{8} | — | November 11, 2004 | Kitt Peak | Spacewatch | EUN | 1.8 km | MPC · JPL |
| 531351 | 2012 RB_{9} | — | August 10, 2012 | Kitt Peak | Spacewatch | · | 2.1 km | MPC · JPL |
| 531352 | 2012 RT_{9} | — | January 10, 2011 | Kitt Peak | Spacewatch | H | 520 m | MPC · JPL |
| 531353 | 2012 RV_{10} | — | September 12, 2012 | Siding Spring | SSS | · | 2.9 km | MPC · JPL |
| 531354 | 2012 RR_{15} | — | September 14, 2012 | Mount Lemmon | Mount Lemmon Survey | H | 640 m | MPC · JPL |
| 531355 | 2012 RV_{15} | — | March 5, 2011 | Kitt Peak | Spacewatch | H | 480 m | MPC · JPL |
| 531356 | 2012 RH_{19} | — | September 14, 2012 | Catalina | CSS | TIR | 2.7 km | MPC · JPL |
| 531357 | 2012 RE_{20} | — | September 20, 2001 | Socorro | LINEAR | · | 540 m | MPC · JPL |
| 531358 | 2012 RF_{28} | — | August 14, 2012 | Haleakala | Pan-STARRS 1 | · | 1.1 km | MPC · JPL |
| 531359 | 2012 RD_{32} | — | September 18, 2004 | Socorro | LINEAR | H | 530 m | MPC · JPL |
| 531360 | 2012 RG_{34} | — | September 15, 2012 | Kitt Peak | Spacewatch | H | 450 m | MPC · JPL |
| 531361 | 2012 RY_{34} | — | September 15, 2012 | Kitt Peak | Spacewatch | TIR | 3.1 km | MPC · JPL |
| 531362 | 2012 RP_{37} | — | April 2, 2005 | Mount Lemmon | Mount Lemmon Survey | · | 2.2 km | MPC · JPL |
| 531363 | 2012 RX_{38} | — | September 15, 2012 | Mount Lemmon | Mount Lemmon Survey | · | 1.6 km | MPC · JPL |
| 531364 | 2012 RN_{41} | — | September 15, 2012 | La Sagra | OAM | · | 3.2 km | MPC · JPL |
| 531365 | 2012 RE_{42} | — | September 15, 2012 | Mount Lemmon | Mount Lemmon Survey | · | 1.2 km | MPC · JPL |
| 531366 | 2012 RD_{43} | — | November 20, 1995 | Kitt Peak | Spacewatch | · | 2.7 km | MPC · JPL |
| 531367 | 2012 RQ_{43} | — | August 10, 2012 | Kitt Peak | Spacewatch | · | 2.9 km | MPC · JPL |
| 531368 | 2012 RX_{43} | — | September 13, 2012 | Mount Lemmon | Mount Lemmon Survey | L5 | 7.0 km | MPC · JPL |
| 531369 | 2012 RE_{44} | — | January 31, 2009 | Mount Lemmon | Mount Lemmon Survey | · | 2.9 km | MPC · JPL |
| 531370 | 2012 RF_{44} | — | August 12, 2007 | XuYi | PMO NEO Survey Program | KOR | 1.6 km | MPC · JPL |
| 531371 | 2012 RP_{44} | — | September 12, 2012 | Siding Spring | SSS | NYS | 1.4 km | MPC · JPL |
| 531372 | 2012 SD_{1} | — | November 11, 2001 | Kitt Peak | Spacewatch | L5 | 9.6 km | MPC · JPL |
| 531373 | 2012 SC_{5} | — | September 14, 2012 | Catalina | CSS | H | 490 m | MPC · JPL |
| 531374 | 2012 SO_{5} | — | October 14, 2001 | Socorro | LINEAR | · | 2.7 km | MPC · JPL |
| 531375 | 2012 SZ_{9} | — | September 16, 2001 | Socorro | LINEAR | · | 2.5 km | MPC · JPL |
| 531376 | 2012 SY_{10} | — | February 23, 2011 | Catalina | CSS | H | 510 m | MPC · JPL |
| 531377 | 2012 SE_{11} | — | September 16, 2012 | Kitt Peak | Spacewatch | · | 2.1 km | MPC · JPL |
| 531378 | 2012 SC_{12} | — | September 17, 2012 | Mount Lemmon | Mount Lemmon Survey | · | 3.2 km | MPC · JPL |
| 531379 | 2012 ST_{13} | — | September 17, 2012 | Mount Lemmon | Mount Lemmon Survey | · | 2.3 km | MPC · JPL |
| 531380 | 2012 SU_{13} | — | September 17, 2012 | Mount Lemmon | Mount Lemmon Survey | HOF | 2.2 km | MPC · JPL |
| 531381 | 2012 SC_{14} | — | September 17, 2012 | Mount Lemmon | Mount Lemmon Survey | · | 2.5 km | MPC · JPL |
| 531382 | 2012 SK_{14} | — | September 17, 2012 | Kitt Peak | Spacewatch | · | 1.8 km | MPC · JPL |
| 531383 | 2012 SE_{26} | — | September 17, 2012 | Mount Lemmon | Mount Lemmon Survey | · | 2.6 km | MPC · JPL |
| 531384 | 2012 SM_{30} | — | October 9, 2007 | Kitt Peak | Spacewatch | · | 2.5 km | MPC · JPL |
| 531385 | 2012 SM_{31} | — | September 14, 2012 | Kitt Peak | Spacewatch | EUN | 1.2 km | MPC · JPL |
| 531386 | 2012 SC_{34} | — | August 26, 2012 | Haleakala | Pan-STARRS 1 | · | 1.5 km | MPC · JPL |
| 531387 | 2012 SY_{35} | — | April 4, 2010 | Kitt Peak | Spacewatch | · | 2.5 km | MPC · JPL |
| 531388 | 2012 SP_{39} | — | August 26, 2012 | Haleakala | Pan-STARRS 1 | EOS | 1.6 km | MPC · JPL |
| 531389 | 2012 SS_{48} | — | September 17, 2012 | Kitt Peak | Spacewatch | · | 1.6 km | MPC · JPL |
| 531390 | 2012 SS_{49} | — | September 14, 2012 | Catalina | CSS | · | 3.5 km | MPC · JPL |
| 531391 | 2012 SA_{58} | — | April 30, 2006 | Kitt Peak | Spacewatch | H | 540 m | MPC · JPL |
| 531392 | 2012 SC_{58} | — | September 26, 2012 | Haleakala | Pan-STARRS 1 | H | 500 m | MPC · JPL |
| 531393 | 2012 SR_{60} | — | March 14, 2010 | Mount Lemmon | Mount Lemmon Survey | · | 2.6 km | MPC · JPL |
| 531394 | 2012 SY_{60} | — | August 26, 2012 | Haleakala | Pan-STARRS 1 | EOS | 1.6 km | MPC · JPL |
| 531395 | 2012 SW_{62} | — | October 17, 2003 | Kitt Peak | Spacewatch | · | 1.8 km | MPC · JPL |
| 531396 | 2012 SB_{63} | — | September 15, 2012 | Kitt Peak | Spacewatch | HYG | 2.3 km | MPC · JPL |
| 531397 | 2012 SS_{63} | — | March 11, 2011 | Mount Lemmon | Mount Lemmon Survey | H | 490 m | MPC · JPL |
| 531398 | 2012 SM_{64} | — | October 6, 2008 | Kitt Peak | Spacewatch | KON | 1.9 km | MPC · JPL |
| 531399 | 2012 SA_{68} | — | November 18, 2007 | Kitt Peak | Spacewatch | · | 1.6 km | MPC · JPL |
| 531400 | 2012 SE_{68} | — | October 12, 2007 | Mount Lemmon | Mount Lemmon Survey | · | 2.6 km | MPC · JPL |

== 531401–531500 ==
back to top

| Designation | | | Discovery | | | Properties | | Ref |
| Permanent | Provisional | Named after | Date | Site | Discoverer(s) | Category | Diam. | Ref |
|---|---|---|---|---|---|---|---|---|
| 531401 | 2012 SG_{68} | — | March 4, 2006 | Kitt Peak | Spacewatch | · | 1.9 km | MPC · JPL |
| 531402 | 2012 SK_{68} | — | September 17, 2012 | Kitt Peak | Spacewatch | · | 1.6 km | MPC · JPL |
| 531403 | 2012 SL_{68} | — | September 19, 2012 | Mount Lemmon | Mount Lemmon Survey | · | 1.9 km | MPC · JPL |
| 531404 | 2012 SO_{68} | — | October 14, 2007 | Mount Lemmon | Mount Lemmon Survey | · | 2.3 km | MPC · JPL |
| 531405 | 2012 SR_{68} | — | September 22, 2012 | Kitt Peak | Spacewatch | · | 1.9 km | MPC · JPL |
| 531406 | 2012 SS_{68} | — | February 3, 2009 | Kitt Peak | Spacewatch | · | 2.4 km | MPC · JPL |
| 531407 | 2012 ST_{68} | — | October 16, 2007 | Mount Lemmon | Mount Lemmon Survey | · | 2.0 km | MPC · JPL |
| 531408 | 2012 SU_{68} | — | September 25, 2012 | Mount Lemmon | Mount Lemmon Survey | · | 2.0 km | MPC · JPL |
| 531409 | 2012 SV_{68} | — | September 25, 2012 | Kitt Peak | Spacewatch | HYG | 2.4 km | MPC · JPL |
| 531410 | 2012 SW_{68} | — | September 16, 2012 | Kitt Peak | Spacewatch | · | 2.6 km | MPC · JPL |
| 531411 | 2012 SX_{68} | — | September 18, 1995 | Kitt Peak | Spacewatch | · | 3.1 km | MPC · JPL |
| 531412 | 2012 SZ_{68} | — | September 4, 2007 | Mount Lemmon | Mount Lemmon Survey | AGN | 1.1 km | MPC · JPL |
| 531413 | 2012 SA_{69} | — | September 4, 2007 | Mount Lemmon | Mount Lemmon Survey | NEM | 2.4 km | MPC · JPL |
| 531414 | 2012 SG_{69} | — | March 27, 2009 | Mount Lemmon | Mount Lemmon Survey | · | 2.6 km | MPC · JPL |
| 531415 | 2012 SH_{69} | — | November 30, 2008 | Kitt Peak | Spacewatch | · | 1.5 km | MPC · JPL |
| 531416 | 2012 SL_{69} | — | September 16, 2003 | Kitt Peak | Spacewatch | · | 1.7 km | MPC · JPL |
| 531417 | 2012 SR_{69} | — | September 4, 2003 | Kitt Peak | Spacewatch | · | 1.2 km | MPC · JPL |
| 531418 | 2012 SS_{69} | — | September 17, 2012 | Mount Lemmon | Mount Lemmon Survey | · | 1.5 km | MPC · JPL |
| 531419 | 2012 SE_{70} | — | November 17, 2008 | Kitt Peak | Spacewatch | · | 1.3 km | MPC · JPL |
| 531420 | 2012 SC_{71} | — | September 22, 2012 | Kitt Peak | Spacewatch | · | 2.3 km | MPC · JPL |
| 531421 | 2012 SJ_{71} | — | September 24, 2012 | Kitt Peak | Spacewatch | · | 2.6 km | MPC · JPL |
| 531422 | 2012 SP_{71} | — | September 25, 2012 | Kitt Peak | Spacewatch | · | 1.2 km | MPC · JPL |
| 531423 | 2012 ST_{71} | — | February 3, 2009 | Mount Lemmon | Mount Lemmon Survey | EOS | 1.7 km | MPC · JPL |
| 531424 | 2012 SX_{71} | — | October 13, 2007 | Mount Lemmon | Mount Lemmon Survey | · | 1.8 km | MPC · JPL |
| 531425 | 2012 SA_{72} | — | September 18, 2012 | Mount Lemmon | Mount Lemmon Survey | · | 1.8 km | MPC · JPL |
| 531426 | 2012 SC_{72} | — | November 7, 2007 | Mount Lemmon | Mount Lemmon Survey | · | 2.2 km | MPC · JPL |
| 531427 | 2012 SD_{72} | — | January 20, 2009 | Kitt Peak | Spacewatch | · | 2.2 km | MPC · JPL |
| 531428 | 2012 TG_{4} | — | October 4, 2012 | Haleakala | Pan-STARRS 1 | H | 540 m | MPC · JPL |
| 531429 | 2012 TV_{4} | — | July 28, 2009 | Catalina | CSS | H | 640 m | MPC · JPL |
| 531430 | 2012 TO_{9} | — | September 16, 2012 | Kitt Peak | Spacewatch | · | 2.1 km | MPC · JPL |
| 531431 | 2012 TT_{9} | — | September 21, 2012 | Catalina | CSS | · | 1.7 km | MPC · JPL |
| 531432 | 2012 TX_{9} | — | August 24, 2012 | Kitt Peak | Spacewatch | GEF | 1.1 km | MPC · JPL |
| 531433 | 2012 TB_{12} | — | September 16, 2012 | Mount Lemmon | Mount Lemmon Survey | · | 3.4 km | MPC · JPL |
| 531434 | 2012 TJ_{12} | — | September 23, 2012 | Mount Lemmon | Mount Lemmon Survey | · | 1.2 km | MPC · JPL |
| 531435 | 2012 TC_{13} | — | September 16, 2012 | Catalina | CSS | · | 2.5 km | MPC · JPL |
| 531436 | 2012 TH_{13} | — | November 2, 2007 | Kitt Peak | Spacewatch | · | 1.6 km | MPC · JPL |
| 531437 | 2012 TJ_{13} | — | October 6, 2012 | Haleakala | Pan-STARRS 1 | · | 3.2 km | MPC · JPL |
| 531438 | 2012 TJ_{19} | — | September 22, 2012 | Mount Lemmon | Mount Lemmon Survey | · | 1.8 km | MPC · JPL |
| 531439 | 2012 TN_{19} | — | September 11, 2007 | Mount Lemmon | Mount Lemmon Survey | HOF | 2.7 km | MPC · JPL |
| 531440 | 2012 TC_{22} | — | October 5, 2007 | Kitt Peak | Spacewatch | · | 1.6 km | MPC · JPL |
| 531441 | 2012 TE_{22} | — | September 15, 2012 | Kitt Peak | Spacewatch | · | 1.4 km | MPC · JPL |
| 531442 | 2012 TF_{22} | — | March 27, 2011 | Mount Lemmon | Mount Lemmon Survey | H | 490 m | MPC · JPL |
| 531443 | 2012 TQ_{22} | — | January 1, 2008 | Kitt Peak | Spacewatch | · | 1.8 km | MPC · JPL |
| 531444 | 2012 TV_{22} | — | September 15, 2012 | Kitt Peak | Spacewatch | THM | 1.9 km | MPC · JPL |
| 531445 | 2012 TW_{22} | — | September 11, 2012 | Siding Spring | SSS | TIR | 2.9 km | MPC · JPL |
| 531446 | 2012 TZ_{22} | — | September 25, 2001 | Kitt Peak | Spacewatch | H | 540 m | MPC · JPL |
| 531447 | 2012 TT_{25} | — | September 13, 2007 | Mount Lemmon | Mount Lemmon Survey | · | 1.4 km | MPC · JPL |
| 531448 | 2012 TG_{28} | — | September 15, 2012 | Kitt Peak | Spacewatch | · | 2.8 km | MPC · JPL |
| 531449 | 2012 TZ_{29} | — | September 20, 2001 | Kitt Peak | Spacewatch | · | 2.8 km | MPC · JPL |
| 531450 | 2012 TM_{35} | — | September 26, 2012 | Haleakala | Pan-STARRS 1 | H | 510 m | MPC · JPL |
| 531451 | 2012 TW_{36} | — | November 3, 2007 | Mount Lemmon | Mount Lemmon Survey | · | 2.8 km | MPC · JPL |
| 531452 | 2012 TX_{37} | — | October 7, 2012 | Haleakala | Pan-STARRS 1 | · | 1.6 km | MPC · JPL |
| 531453 | 2012 TP_{38} | — | October 8, 2012 | Mount Lemmon | Mount Lemmon Survey | · | 2.4 km | MPC · JPL |
| 531454 | 2012 TJ_{39} | — | February 4, 2009 | Mount Lemmon | Mount Lemmon Survey | · | 2.1 km | MPC · JPL |
| 531455 | 2012 TX_{39} | — | September 16, 2012 | Kitt Peak | Spacewatch | · | 1.5 km | MPC · JPL |
| 531456 | 2012 TE_{45} | — | October 30, 2007 | Kitt Peak | Spacewatch | · | 2.4 km | MPC · JPL |
| 531457 | 2012 TL_{46} | — | October 28, 2008 | Kitt Peak | Spacewatch | · | 1.3 km | MPC · JPL |
| 531458 | 2012 TX_{47} | — | October 11, 2007 | Mount Lemmon | Mount Lemmon Survey | · | 1.6 km | MPC · JPL |
| 531459 | 2012 TU_{48} | — | September 21, 2012 | Kitt Peak | Spacewatch | · | 2.3 km | MPC · JPL |
| 531460 | 2012 TK_{50} | — | September 21, 2012 | Kitt Peak | Spacewatch | · | 2.0 km | MPC · JPL |
| 531461 | 2012 TU_{51} | — | April 29, 2003 | Anderson Mesa | LONEOS | H | 570 m | MPC · JPL |
| 531462 | 2012 TB_{52} | — | October 9, 2012 | Catalina | CSS | H | 740 m | MPC · JPL |
| 531463 | 2012 TK_{55} | — | August 19, 2006 | Kitt Peak | Spacewatch | THM | 1.9 km | MPC · JPL |
| 531464 | 2012 TU_{55} | — | October 30, 2002 | Kitt Peak | Spacewatch | · | 1.5 km | MPC · JPL |
| 531465 | 2012 TF_{57} | — | December 4, 2008 | Mount Lemmon | Mount Lemmon Survey | · | 1.8 km | MPC · JPL |
| 531466 | 2012 TA_{58} | — | October 21, 2007 | Mount Lemmon | Mount Lemmon Survey | · | 1.9 km | MPC · JPL |
| 531467 | 2012 TT_{68} | — | October 8, 2012 | Mount Lemmon | Mount Lemmon Survey | H | 370 m | MPC · JPL |
| 531468 | 2012 TQ_{73} | — | November 4, 2007 | Kitt Peak | Spacewatch | · | 2.2 km | MPC · JPL |
| 531469 | 2012 TR_{74} | — | April 30, 2010 | WISE | WISE | L5 | 7.3 km | MPC · JPL |
| 531470 | 2012 TP_{77} | — | October 6, 2012 | Haleakala | Pan-STARRS 1 | H | 410 m | MPC · JPL |
| 531471 | 2012 TY_{78} | — | October 15, 1993 | Kitt Peak | Spacewatch | · | 790 m | MPC · JPL |
| 531472 | 2012 TC_{80} | — | October 4, 2012 | Mount Lemmon | Mount Lemmon Survey | · | 1.7 km | MPC · JPL |
| 531473 | 2012 TS_{80} | — | November 19, 2007 | Kitt Peak | Spacewatch | · | 2.2 km | MPC · JPL |
| 531474 | 2012 TL_{81} | — | August 20, 2006 | Kitt Peak | Spacewatch | HYG | 2.3 km | MPC · JPL |
| 531475 | 2012 TS_{82} | — | September 16, 2012 | Kitt Peak | Spacewatch | · | 1.3 km | MPC · JPL |
| 531476 | 2012 TC_{91} | — | October 23, 2001 | Kitt Peak | Spacewatch | · | 3.2 km | MPC · JPL |
| 531477 | 2012 TJ_{94} | — | December 4, 2007 | Catalina | CSS | · | 1.8 km | MPC · JPL |
| 531478 | 2012 TW_{94} | — | October 8, 2012 | Kitt Peak | Spacewatch | · | 2.0 km | MPC · JPL |
| 531479 | 2012 TW_{100} | — | October 8, 2012 | Catalina | CSS | H | 480 m | MPC · JPL |
| 531480 | 2012 TS_{101} | — | February 27, 2009 | Mount Lemmon | Mount Lemmon Survey | TIR | 2.5 km | MPC · JPL |
| 531481 | 2012 TH_{103} | — | September 15, 2012 | Kitt Peak | Spacewatch | · | 1.9 km | MPC · JPL |
| 531482 | 2012 TW_{104} | — | September 16, 2012 | Kitt Peak | Spacewatch | · | 2.3 km | MPC · JPL |
| 531483 | 2012 TJ_{107} | — | October 10, 2012 | Mount Lemmon | Mount Lemmon Survey | · | 970 m | MPC · JPL |
| 531484 | 2012 TY_{112} | — | September 25, 2012 | Kitt Peak | Spacewatch | · | 2.0 km | MPC · JPL |
| 531485 | 2012 TD_{113} | — | September 16, 2012 | Kitt Peak | Spacewatch | HOF | 2.1 km | MPC · JPL |
| 531486 | 2012 TS_{113} | — | November 5, 2007 | Kitt Peak | Spacewatch | VER | 2.3 km | MPC · JPL |
| 531487 | 2012 TF_{114} | — | September 21, 2012 | Kitt Peak | Spacewatch | · | 2.8 km | MPC · JPL |
| 531488 | 2012 TG_{119} | — | September 21, 2012 | Kitt Peak | Spacewatch | · | 1.6 km | MPC · JPL |
| 531489 | 2012 TH_{122} | — | March 27, 2011 | Mount Lemmon | Mount Lemmon Survey | H | 490 m | MPC · JPL |
| 531490 | 2012 TO_{122} | — | December 22, 2008 | Kitt Peak | Spacewatch | · | 1.3 km | MPC · JPL |
| 531491 | 2012 TC_{129} | — | March 23, 2006 | Kitt Peak | Spacewatch | H | 460 m | MPC · JPL |
| 531492 | 2012 TU_{129} | — | October 2, 2008 | Kitt Peak | Spacewatch | · | 860 m | MPC · JPL |
| 531493 | 2012 TU_{135} | — | October 8, 2008 | Kitt Peak | Spacewatch | · | 1.1 km | MPC · JPL |
| 531494 | 2012 TX_{139} | — | October 9, 2012 | Haleakala | Pan-STARRS 1 | H | 450 m | MPC · JPL |
| 531495 | 2012 TM_{140} | — | October 13, 2012 | Haleakala | Pan-STARRS 1 | · | 2.1 km | MPC · JPL |
| 531496 | 2012 TC_{141} | — | October 20, 2007 | Mount Lemmon | Mount Lemmon Survey | THM | 1.6 km | MPC · JPL |
| 531497 | 2012 TC_{144} | — | October 8, 2012 | Haleakala | Pan-STARRS 1 | · | 2.1 km | MPC · JPL |
| 531498 | 2012 TW_{145} | — | October 10, 2012 | Haleakala | Pan-STARRS 1 | H | 560 m | MPC · JPL |
| 531499 | 2012 TZ_{145} | — | October 15, 2004 | Socorro | LINEAR | H | 480 m | MPC · JPL |
| 531500 | 2012 TN_{146} | — | November 18, 2003 | Kitt Peak | Spacewatch | · | 2.0 km | MPC · JPL |

== 531501–531600 ==
back to top

| Designation | | | Discovery | | | Properties | | Ref |
| Permanent | Provisional | Named after | Date | Site | Discoverer(s) | Category | Diam. | Ref |
|---|---|---|---|---|---|---|---|---|
| 531501 | 2012 TH_{148} | — | October 8, 2012 | Haleakala | Pan-STARRS 1 | MAR | 640 m | MPC · JPL |
| 531502 | 2012 TX_{150} | — | October 8, 2012 | Mount Lemmon | Mount Lemmon Survey | H | 600 m | MPC · JPL |
| 531503 | 2012 TN_{152} | — | September 22, 2012 | Kitt Peak | Spacewatch | · | 2.3 km | MPC · JPL |
| 531504 | 2012 TS_{152} | — | September 22, 2012 | Kitt Peak | Spacewatch | · | 3.5 km | MPC · JPL |
| 531505 | 2012 TV_{152} | — | October 8, 2012 | Haleakala | Pan-STARRS 1 | L5 | 7.9 km | MPC · JPL |
| 531506 | 2012 TP_{153} | — | September 18, 2012 | Kitt Peak | Spacewatch | MAR | 1.0 km | MPC · JPL |
| 531507 | 2012 TJ_{155} | — | October 17, 2001 | Kitt Peak | Spacewatch | THM | 1.8 km | MPC · JPL |
| 531508 | 2012 TQ_{156} | — | October 23, 2008 | Kitt Peak | Spacewatch | · | 1.0 km | MPC · JPL |
| 531509 | 2012 TC_{158} | — | October 8, 2012 | Haleakala | Pan-STARRS 1 | THM | 1.6 km | MPC · JPL |
| 531510 | 2012 TB_{163} | — | October 8, 2012 | Haleakala | Pan-STARRS 1 | · | 1.5 km | MPC · JPL |
| 531511 | 2012 TQ_{163} | — | September 23, 2008 | Kitt Peak | Spacewatch | · | 950 m | MPC · JPL |
| 531512 | 2012 TD_{164} | — | October 8, 2012 | Haleakala | Pan-STARRS 1 | · | 2.6 km | MPC · JPL |
| 531513 | 2012 TD_{167} | — | October 8, 2012 | Haleakala | Pan-STARRS 1 | HYG | 2.4 km | MPC · JPL |
| 531514 | 2012 TN_{170} | — | October 6, 2012 | Mount Lemmon | Mount Lemmon Survey | · | 2.5 km | MPC · JPL |
| 531515 | 2012 TO_{171} | — | October 9, 2012 | Mount Lemmon | Mount Lemmon Survey | · | 2.8 km | MPC · JPL |
| 531516 | 2012 TU_{172} | — | October 9, 2012 | Mount Lemmon | Mount Lemmon Survey | EOS | 1.9 km | MPC · JPL |
| 531517 | 2012 TE_{173} | — | February 22, 2009 | Kitt Peak | Spacewatch | · | 2.8 km | MPC · JPL |
| 531518 | 2012 TW_{182} | — | September 13, 2007 | Mount Lemmon | Mount Lemmon Survey | KOR | 1.0 km | MPC · JPL |
| 531519 | 2012 TG_{186} | — | October 9, 2012 | Kitt Peak | Spacewatch | · | 2.3 km | MPC · JPL |
| 531520 | 2012 TX_{190} | — | September 16, 2012 | Mount Lemmon | Mount Lemmon Survey | · | 1.3 km | MPC · JPL |
| 531521 | 2012 TE_{191} | — | August 2, 2010 | WISE | WISE | · | 3.4 km | MPC · JPL |
| 531522 | 2012 TJ_{192} | — | October 10, 2012 | Mount Lemmon | Mount Lemmon Survey | · | 990 m | MPC · JPL |
| 531523 | 2012 TV_{192} | — | September 21, 2012 | Kitt Peak | Spacewatch | · | 1.3 km | MPC · JPL |
| 531524 | 2012 TK_{196} | — | October 10, 2012 | Kitt Peak | Spacewatch | · | 2.4 km | MPC · JPL |
| 531525 | 2012 TP_{198} | — | September 5, 2007 | Mount Lemmon | Mount Lemmon Survey | HOF | 2.4 km | MPC · JPL |
| 531526 | 2012 TC_{201} | — | October 10, 2007 | Kitt Peak | Spacewatch | · | 1.5 km | MPC · JPL |
| 531527 | 2012 TN_{202} | — | September 17, 2012 | Kitt Peak | Spacewatch | · | 1.5 km | MPC · JPL |
| 531528 | 2012 TA_{205} | — | September 11, 2006 | Catalina | CSS | THB | 2.9 km | MPC · JPL |
| 531529 | 2012 TR_{205} | — | August 19, 2006 | Kitt Peak | Spacewatch | · | 2.7 km | MPC · JPL |
| 531530 | 2012 TN_{206} | — | September 14, 2006 | Catalina | CSS | · | 3.3 km | MPC · JPL |
| 531531 | 2012 TK_{212} | — | April 8, 2010 | Kitt Peak | Spacewatch | · | 2.9 km | MPC · JPL |
| 531532 | 2012 TO_{212} | — | October 11, 2012 | Haleakala | Pan-STARRS 1 | · | 1.3 km | MPC · JPL |
| 531533 | 2012 TT_{212} | — | May 25, 2006 | Mount Lemmon | Mount Lemmon Survey | · | 2.9 km | MPC · JPL |
| 531534 | 2012 TJ_{213} | — | February 27, 2009 | Kitt Peak | Spacewatch | · | 2.9 km | MPC · JPL |
| 531535 | 2012 TD_{217} | — | October 13, 2012 | Haleakala | Pan-STARRS 1 | · | 1.8 km | MPC · JPL |
| 531536 | 2012 TE_{217} | — | October 6, 2012 | Haleakala | Pan-STARRS 1 | · | 4.0 km | MPC · JPL |
| 531537 | 2012 TJ_{217} | — | October 13, 2012 | Haleakala | Pan-STARRS 1 | EOS | 1.7 km | MPC · JPL |
| 531538 | 2012 TL_{218} | — | September 22, 2012 | Kitt Peak | Spacewatch | L5 | 8.6 km | MPC · JPL |
| 531539 | 2012 TV_{221} | — | October 4, 2012 | Mount Lemmon | Mount Lemmon Survey | · | 1.5 km | MPC · JPL |
| 531540 | 2012 TX_{222} | — | October 7, 2012 | Kitt Peak | Spacewatch | HNS | 1.2 km | MPC · JPL |
| 531541 | 2012 TK_{225} | — | October 9, 2007 | Mount Lemmon | Mount Lemmon Survey | · | 1.6 km | MPC · JPL |
| 531542 | 2012 TG_{228} | — | March 2, 2009 | Kitt Peak | Spacewatch | · | 3.0 km | MPC · JPL |
| 531543 | 2012 TZ_{230} | — | October 15, 2012 | Kitt Peak | Spacewatch | · | 2.8 km | MPC · JPL |
| 531544 | 2012 TW_{231} | — | October 28, 2008 | Kitt Peak | Spacewatch | · | 1.4 km | MPC · JPL |
| 531545 | 2012 TY_{231} | — | October 6, 2012 | Haleakala | Pan-STARRS 1 | · | 2.9 km | MPC · JPL |
| 531546 | 2012 TY_{233} | — | August 18, 2006 | Kitt Peak | Spacewatch | · | 2.4 km | MPC · JPL |
| 531547 | 2012 TC_{237} | — | October 7, 2012 | Haleakala | Pan-STARRS 1 | · | 1.5 km | MPC · JPL |
| 531548 | 2012 TG_{240} | — | September 20, 2006 | Kitt Peak | Spacewatch | · | 2.2 km | MPC · JPL |
| 531549 | 2012 TV_{243} | — | November 2, 2007 | Kitt Peak | Spacewatch | EOS | 1.7 km | MPC · JPL |
| 531550 | 2012 TB_{244} | — | May 5, 2011 | Kitt Peak | Spacewatch | · | 970 m | MPC · JPL |
| 531551 | 2012 TV_{245} | — | September 18, 2012 | Kitt Peak | Spacewatch | HNS | 1.3 km | MPC · JPL |
| 531552 | 2012 TJ_{246} | — | October 8, 2012 | Haleakala | Pan-STARRS 1 | H | 450 m | MPC · JPL |
| 531553 | 2012 TC_{263} | — | October 8, 2012 | Mount Lemmon | Mount Lemmon Survey | · | 2.6 km | MPC · JPL |
| 531554 | 2012 TE_{265} | — | October 8, 2012 | Haleakala | Pan-STARRS 1 | · | 2.1 km | MPC · JPL |
| 531555 | 2012 TX_{267} | — | October 8, 2012 | Mount Lemmon | Mount Lemmon Survey | L5 | 7.2 km | MPC · JPL |
| 531556 | 2012 TQ_{268} | — | October 10, 2007 | Mount Lemmon | Mount Lemmon Survey | · | 1.9 km | MPC · JPL |
| 531557 | 2012 TN_{273} | — | October 15, 2012 | Mount Lemmon | Mount Lemmon Survey | · | 2.1 km | MPC · JPL |
| 531558 | 2012 TU_{273} | — | August 18, 2006 | Kitt Peak | Spacewatch | THM | 1.7 km | MPC · JPL |
| 531559 | 2012 TX_{274} | — | October 11, 2012 | Haleakala | Pan-STARRS 1 | · | 3.2 km | MPC · JPL |
| 531560 | 2012 TD_{276} | — | September 21, 2012 | Kitt Peak | Spacewatch | · | 2.8 km | MPC · JPL |
| 531561 | 2012 TW_{278} | — | October 11, 2012 | Haleakala | Pan-STARRS 1 | HOF | 2.1 km | MPC · JPL |
| 531562 | 2012 TC_{283} | — | September 14, 2012 | Mount Lemmon | Mount Lemmon Survey | · | 1.9 km | MPC · JPL |
| 531563 | 2012 TP_{284} | — | January 24, 2010 | WISE | WISE | · | 2.9 km | MPC · JPL |
| 531564 | 2012 TU_{284} | — | October 15, 2012 | Haleakala | Pan-STARRS 1 | · | 2.0 km | MPC · JPL |
| 531565 | 2012 TT_{287} | — | October 10, 2012 | Mount Lemmon | Mount Lemmon Survey | VER | 2.1 km | MPC · JPL |
| 531566 | 2012 TD_{288} | — | May 3, 2008 | Kitt Peak | Spacewatch | L5 | 8.0 km | MPC · JPL |
| 531567 | 2012 TK_{290} | — | October 8, 2012 | Haleakala | Pan-STARRS 1 | · | 1.9 km | MPC · JPL |
| 531568 | 2012 TA_{294} | — | November 8, 2007 | Kitt Peak | Spacewatch | · | 1.3 km | MPC · JPL |
| 531569 | 2012 TN_{295} | — | September 19, 2012 | Mount Lemmon | Mount Lemmon Survey | EOS | 1.3 km | MPC · JPL |
| 531570 | 2012 TN_{296} | — | October 17, 2006 | Kitt Peak | Spacewatch | · | 3.4 km | MPC · JPL |
| 531571 | 2012 TC_{299} | — | October 21, 1995 | Kitt Peak | Spacewatch | VER | 2.0 km | MPC · JPL |
| 531572 | 2012 TK_{304} | — | September 14, 2012 | Kitt Peak | Spacewatch | · | 2.1 km | MPC · JPL |
| 531573 | 2012 TF_{306} | — | September 24, 2012 | Kitt Peak | Spacewatch | · | 2.1 km | MPC · JPL |
| 531574 | 2012 TX_{306} | — | December 30, 2007 | Mount Lemmon | Mount Lemmon Survey | · | 1.4 km | MPC · JPL |
| 531575 | 2012 TC_{307} | — | November 11, 2001 | Socorro | LINEAR | · | 3.4 km | MPC · JPL |
| 531576 | 2012 TX_{309} | — | October 11, 2012 | Kitt Peak | Spacewatch | LIX | 3.1 km | MPC · JPL |
| 531577 | 2012 TY_{310} | — | October 6, 2012 | Haleakala | Pan-STARRS 1 | · | 2.6 km | MPC · JPL |
| 531578 | 2012 TA_{312} | — | October 14, 2012 | Catalina | CSS | · | 2.5 km | MPC · JPL |
| 531579 | 2012 TW_{317} | — | October 10, 2012 | Haleakala | Pan-STARRS 1 | T_{j} (2.98) | 3.6 km | MPC · JPL |
| 531580 | 2012 TC_{318} | — | November 19, 2001 | Socorro | LINEAR | · | 2.9 km | MPC · JPL |
| 531581 | 2012 TA_{320} | — | November 11, 2007 | Mount Lemmon | Mount Lemmon Survey | · | 3.3 km | MPC · JPL |
| 531582 | 2012 TG_{324} | — | May 15, 2009 | Kitt Peak | Spacewatch | L5 | 8.4 km | MPC · JPL |
| 531583 | 2012 TT_{325} | — | October 11, 2012 | Kitt Peak | Spacewatch | EOS | 1.8 km | MPC · JPL |
| 531584 | 2012 TV_{325} | — | February 2, 2008 | Mount Lemmon | Mount Lemmon Survey | · | 1.7 km | MPC · JPL |
| 531585 | 2012 TW_{325} | — | October 16, 2007 | Mount Lemmon | Mount Lemmon Survey | KOR | 1.2 km | MPC · JPL |
| 531586 | 2012 TY_{325} | — | October 9, 2007 | Mount Lemmon | Mount Lemmon Survey | · | 2.0 km | MPC · JPL |
| 531587 | 2012 TZ_{325} | — | April 11, 2010 | Mount Lemmon | Mount Lemmon Survey | HOF | 3.2 km | MPC · JPL |
| 531588 | 2012 TA_{326} | — | September 10, 2007 | Mount Lemmon | Mount Lemmon Survey | KOR | 1.3 km | MPC · JPL |
| 531589 | 2012 TB_{326} | — | October 7, 2007 | Mount Lemmon | Mount Lemmon Survey | · | 1.7 km | MPC · JPL |
| 531590 | 2012 TD_{326} | — | October 8, 2012 | Mount Lemmon | Mount Lemmon Survey | KOR | 1.0 km | MPC · JPL |
| 531591 | 2012 TJ_{326} | — | November 11, 2007 | Mount Lemmon | Mount Lemmon Survey | THM | 2.2 km | MPC · JPL |
| 531592 | 2012 TK_{326} | — | October 10, 2012 | Haleakala | Pan-STARRS 1 | EOS | 1.6 km | MPC · JPL |
| 531593 | 2012 TL_{326} | — | November 2, 2007 | Mount Lemmon | Mount Lemmon Survey | · | 3.6 km | MPC · JPL |
| 531594 | 2012 TO_{326} | — | October 27, 1998 | Kitt Peak | Spacewatch | HOF | 2.3 km | MPC · JPL |
| 531595 | 2012 TB_{327} | — | October 11, 2012 | Haleakala | Pan-STARRS 1 | MAR | 670 m | MPC · JPL |
| 531596 | 2012 TF_{327} | — | October 4, 2012 | Mount Lemmon | Mount Lemmon Survey | · | 3.0 km | MPC · JPL |
| 531597 | 2012 TM_{327} | — | October 6, 2012 | Haleakala | Pan-STARRS 1 | · | 2.0 km | MPC · JPL |
| 531598 | 2012 TO_{327} | — | December 5, 2007 | Mount Lemmon | Mount Lemmon Survey | · | 2.9 km | MPC · JPL |
| 531599 | 2012 TW_{327} | — | September 19, 2012 | Mount Lemmon | Mount Lemmon Survey | · | 1.3 km | MPC · JPL |
| 531600 | 2012 TX_{327} | — | October 15, 2012 | Kitt Peak | Spacewatch | WIT | 970 m | MPC · JPL |

== 531601–531700 ==
back to top

| Designation | | | Discovery | | | Properties | | Ref |
| Permanent | Provisional | Named after | Date | Site | Discoverer(s) | Category | Diam. | Ref |
|---|---|---|---|---|---|---|---|---|
| 531601 | 2012 TB_{328} | — | October 6, 2012 | Mount Lemmon | Mount Lemmon Survey | WIT | 870 m | MPC · JPL |
| 531602 | 2012 TK_{328} | — | October 8, 2012 | Kitt Peak | Spacewatch | · | 2.7 km | MPC · JPL |
| 531603 | 2012 TM_{328} | — | November 17, 2008 | Kitt Peak | Spacewatch | · | 1.3 km | MPC · JPL |
| 531604 | 2012 TP_{328} | — | July 30, 1995 | Kitt Peak | Spacewatch | · | 3.0 km | MPC · JPL |
| 531605 | 2012 TW_{328} | — | August 10, 2007 | Kitt Peak | Spacewatch | (11882) | 1.4 km | MPC · JPL |
| 531606 | 2012 TY_{328} | — | October 8, 2012 | Haleakala | Pan-STARRS 1 | · | 2.7 km | MPC · JPL |
| 531607 | 2012 TH_{329} | — | October 9, 2012 | Mount Lemmon | Mount Lemmon Survey | · | 1.5 km | MPC · JPL |
| 531608 | 2012 TK_{329} | — | October 9, 2012 | Haleakala | Pan-STARRS 1 | THM | 1.6 km | MPC · JPL |
| 531609 | 2012 TN_{329} | — | October 10, 2012 | Mount Lemmon | Mount Lemmon Survey | · | 2.1 km | MPC · JPL |
| 531610 | 2012 TG_{330} | — | October 14, 2012 | Kitt Peak | Spacewatch | NEM | 2.0 km | MPC · JPL |
| 531611 | 2012 TL_{330} | — | April 9, 2010 | Kitt Peak | Spacewatch | EOS | 2.1 km | MPC · JPL |
| 531612 | 2012 TM_{330} | — | October 15, 2012 | Kitt Peak | Spacewatch | · | 1.9 km | MPC · JPL |
| 531613 | 2012 TS_{330} | — | October 5, 2012 | Haleakala | Pan-STARRS 1 | · | 2.0 km | MPC · JPL |
| 531614 | 2012 TW_{330} | — | October 11, 2012 | Kitt Peak | Spacewatch | WIT | 950 m | MPC · JPL |
| 531615 | 2012 TD_{331} | — | September 14, 2006 | Catalina | CSS | · | 2.1 km | MPC · JPL |
| 531616 | 2012 TJ_{331} | — | March 13, 1996 | Kitt Peak | Spacewatch | · | 2.2 km | MPC · JPL |
| 531617 | 2012 TL_{331} | — | October 9, 2012 | Mount Lemmon | Mount Lemmon Survey | · | 1.7 km | MPC · JPL |
| 531618 | 2012 TM_{331} | — | October 9, 2012 | Mount Lemmon | Mount Lemmon Survey | · | 1.3 km | MPC · JPL |
| 531619 | 2012 TN_{331} | — | October 9, 2012 | Mount Lemmon | Mount Lemmon Survey | H | 390 m | MPC · JPL |
| 531620 | 2012 TQ_{331} | — | October 11, 2012 | Mount Lemmon | Mount Lemmon Survey | · | 2.2 km | MPC · JPL |
| 531621 | 2012 TS_{331} | — | October 11, 2007 | Kitt Peak | Spacewatch | BRA | 1.4 km | MPC · JPL |
| 531622 | 2012 TW_{331} | — | October 14, 2012 | Mount Lemmon | Mount Lemmon Survey | · | 840 m | MPC · JPL |
| 531623 | 2012 UU | — | October 8, 2012 | Catalina | CSS | · | 2.5 km | MPC · JPL |
| 531624 | 2012 UF_{1} | — | October 10, 2012 | Haleakala | Pan-STARRS 1 | H | 580 m | MPC · JPL |
| 531625 | 2012 UP_{3} | — | October 7, 2012 | Haleakala | Pan-STARRS 1 | · | 1.8 km | MPC · JPL |
| 531626 | 2012 UD_{5} | — | February 11, 2010 | WISE | WISE | · | 3.2 km | MPC · JPL |
| 531627 | 2012 UP_{7} | — | October 7, 2012 | Haleakala | Pan-STARRS 1 | · | 1.4 km | MPC · JPL |
| 531628 | 2012 UM_{13} | — | October 8, 2012 | Mount Lemmon | Mount Lemmon Survey | · | 1.9 km | MPC · JPL |
| 531629 | 2012 UJ_{14} | — | September 18, 2012 | Kitt Peak | Spacewatch | · | 2.8 km | MPC · JPL |
| 531630 | 2012 UJ_{17} | — | October 8, 2012 | Haleakala | Pan-STARRS 1 | GEF | 890 m | MPC · JPL |
| 531631 | 2012 UY_{17} | — | October 16, 2012 | Mount Lemmon | Mount Lemmon Survey | · | 1.7 km | MPC · JPL |
| 531632 | 2012 UE_{20} | — | October 16, 2012 | Mount Lemmon | Mount Lemmon Survey | · | 1.8 km | MPC · JPL |
| 531633 | 2012 UL_{20} | — | October 17, 1999 | Kitt Peak | Spacewatch | H | 360 m | MPC · JPL |
| 531634 | 2012 UT_{20} | — | October 8, 2012 | Mount Lemmon | Mount Lemmon Survey | TIR | 2.4 km | MPC · JPL |
| 531635 | 2012 US_{21} | — | December 19, 2007 | Mount Lemmon | Mount Lemmon Survey | THB | 2.3 km | MPC · JPL |
| 531636 | 2012 UG_{26} | — | October 17, 2012 | Mount Lemmon | Mount Lemmon Survey | · | 2.2 km | MPC · JPL |
| 531637 | 2012 UH_{28} | — | October 8, 2012 | Kitt Peak | Spacewatch | · | 2.6 km | MPC · JPL |
| 531638 | 2012 UL_{29} | — | December 15, 2007 | Mount Lemmon | Mount Lemmon Survey | · | 2.7 km | MPC · JPL |
| 531639 | 2012 UK_{31} | — | October 16, 2012 | Kitt Peak | Spacewatch | · | 1.9 km | MPC · JPL |
| 531640 | 2012 UH_{32} | — | October 8, 2012 | Kitt Peak | Spacewatch | · | 2.6 km | MPC · JPL |
| 531641 | 2012 UA_{40} | — | January 31, 2009 | Mount Lemmon | Mount Lemmon Survey | · | 2.0 km | MPC · JPL |
| 531642 | 2012 UT_{40} | — | October 23, 2001 | Kitt Peak | Spacewatch | · | 2.2 km | MPC · JPL |
| 531643 | 2012 UH_{45} | — | October 18, 2012 | Haleakala | Pan-STARRS 1 | HYG | 2.1 km | MPC · JPL |
| 531644 | 2012 UN_{50} | — | October 18, 2012 | Haleakala | Pan-STARRS 1 | · | 2.0 km | MPC · JPL |
| 531645 | 2012 UB_{53} | — | April 19, 2006 | Mount Lemmon | Mount Lemmon Survey | H | 470 m | MPC · JPL |
| 531646 | 2012 UN_{53} | — | October 19, 2012 | Mount Lemmon | Mount Lemmon Survey | · | 3.3 km | MPC · JPL |
| 531647 | 2012 UZ_{55} | — | September 26, 2012 | Mount Lemmon | Mount Lemmon Survey | · | 2.8 km | MPC · JPL |
| 531648 | 2012 UV_{58} | — | October 19, 2012 | Haleakala | Pan-STARRS 1 | · | 2.8 km | MPC · JPL |
| 531649 | 2012 UD_{61} | — | October 20, 2012 | Mount Lemmon | Mount Lemmon Survey | · | 2.3 km | MPC · JPL |
| 531650 | 2012 UR_{71} | — | November 7, 2007 | Kitt Peak | Spacewatch | · | 1.5 km | MPC · JPL |
| 531651 | 2012 UL_{75} | — | October 18, 2012 | Haleakala | Pan-STARRS 1 | HOF | 2.2 km | MPC · JPL |
| 531652 | 2012 UC_{78} | — | October 19, 2012 | Haleakala | Pan-STARRS 1 | THM | 1.6 km | MPC · JPL |
| 531653 | 2012 UN_{78} | — | October 2, 2006 | Mount Lemmon | Mount Lemmon Survey | · | 3.5 km | MPC · JPL |
| 531654 | 2012 UD_{86} | — | October 14, 2012 | Kitt Peak | Spacewatch | · | 1.6 km | MPC · JPL |
| 531655 | 2012 UA_{87} | — | December 18, 2001 | Kitt Peak | Spacewatch | · | 2.5 km | MPC · JPL |
| 531656 | 2012 UA_{88} | — | October 21, 2012 | Haleakala | Pan-STARRS 1 | · | 920 m | MPC · JPL |
| 531657 | 2012 UC_{94} | — | November 27, 2008 | La Sagra | OAM | MAR | 1.3 km | MPC · JPL |
| 531658 | 2012 UH_{100} | — | October 18, 2012 | Haleakala | Pan-STARRS 1 | · | 1.1 km | MPC · JPL |
| 531659 | 2012 UK_{105} | — | October 11, 2012 | Kitt Peak | Spacewatch | · | 1.9 km | MPC · JPL |
| 531660 | 2012 UO_{106} | — | October 15, 2012 | Kitt Peak | Spacewatch | · | 3.4 km | MPC · JPL |
| 531661 | 2012 UW_{106} | — | August 28, 2012 | Mount Lemmon | Mount Lemmon Survey | · | 1.5 km | MPC · JPL |
| 531662 | 2012 UV_{107} | — | September 19, 2012 | Mount Lemmon | Mount Lemmon Survey | EOS | 1.7 km | MPC · JPL |
| 531663 | 2012 UW_{108} | — | September 19, 2012 | Mount Lemmon | Mount Lemmon Survey | · | 2.5 km | MPC · JPL |
| 531664 | 2012 UG_{113} | — | September 10, 2007 | Kitt Peak | Spacewatch | BRA | 1.1 km | MPC · JPL |
| 531665 | 2012 UR_{113} | — | September 16, 2012 | Kitt Peak | Spacewatch | · | 1.3 km | MPC · JPL |
| 531666 | 2012 UH_{120} | — | October 15, 2012 | Kitt Peak | Spacewatch | · | 2.4 km | MPC · JPL |
| 531667 | 2012 UU_{130} | — | September 28, 2006 | Catalina | CSS | · | 3.1 km | MPC · JPL |
| 531668 | 2012 UG_{136} | — | October 8, 2012 | Kitt Peak | Spacewatch | H | 610 m | MPC · JPL |
| 531669 | 2012 UH_{136} | — | October 17, 2012 | Catalina | CSS | · | 2.3 km | MPC · JPL |
| 531670 | 2012 UR_{137} | — | March 26, 2011 | Haleakala | Pan-STARRS 1 | H | 650 m | MPC · JPL |
| 531671 | 2012 UJ_{138} | — | October 19, 2012 | Catalina | CSS | H | 470 m | MPC · JPL |
| 531672 | 2012 UP_{151} | — | September 19, 2001 | Socorro | LINEAR | · | 1.7 km | MPC · JPL |
| 531673 | 2012 UO_{154} | — | January 1, 2008 | Catalina | CSS | · | 1.8 km | MPC · JPL |
| 531674 | 2012 UT_{156} | — | September 21, 2012 | Kitt Peak | Spacewatch | · | 1.2 km | MPC · JPL |
| 531675 | 2012 UB_{158} | — | May 21, 2006 | Kitt Peak | Spacewatch | H | 430 m | MPC · JPL |
| 531676 | 2012 UF_{162} | — | October 22, 2012 | Kitt Peak | Spacewatch | · | 1.4 km | MPC · JPL |
| 531677 | 2012 UE_{163} | — | October 15, 2012 | Catalina | CSS | · | 2.0 km | MPC · JPL |
| 531678 | 2012 UB_{166} | — | April 14, 2011 | Haleakala | Pan-STARRS 1 | H | 400 m | MPC · JPL |
| 531679 | 2012 UU_{168} | — | October 30, 2007 | Kitt Peak | Spacewatch | · | 2.8 km | MPC · JPL |
| 531680 | 2012 UB_{169} | — | December 17, 2007 | Kitt Peak | Spacewatch | · | 1.7 km | MPC · JPL |
| 531681 | 2012 UF_{174} | — | October 27, 2012 | Mount Lemmon | Mount Lemmon Survey | H | 650 m | MPC · JPL |
| 531682 | 2012 UB_{178} | — | December 10, 2012 | Haleakala | Pan-STARRS 1 | cubewano (hot) | 289 km | MPC · JPL |
| 531683 | 2012 UC_{178} | — | October 9, 2010 | Haleakala | Pan-STARRS 1 | res · 3:5 | 162 km | MPC · JPL |
| 531684 | 2012 UE_{178} | — | November 9, 2010 | Haleakala | Pan-STARRS 1 | cubewano (cold) | 193 km | MPC · JPL |
| 531685 | 2012 UU_{178} | — | October 21, 2012 | Haleakala | Pan-STARRS 1 | · | 1.7 km | MPC · JPL |
| 531686 | 2012 UJ_{179} | — | October 18, 2012 | Haleakala | Pan-STARRS 1 | · | 1.7 km | MPC · JPL |
| 531687 | 2012 UK_{179} | — | October 7, 2007 | Mount Lemmon | Mount Lemmon Survey | KOR | 990 m | MPC · JPL |
| 531688 | 2012 UL_{179} | — | November 5, 2007 | Mount Lemmon | Mount Lemmon Survey | THM | 2.1 km | MPC · JPL |
| 531689 | 2012 UQ_{179} | — | September 14, 2006 | Kitt Peak | Spacewatch | · | 2.3 km | MPC · JPL |
| 531690 | 2012 UA_{180} | — | October 20, 2012 | Haleakala | Pan-STARRS 1 | · | 3.5 km | MPC · JPL |
| 531691 | 2012 UB_{180} | — | October 27, 2012 | Mount Lemmon | Mount Lemmon Survey | EOS | 2.1 km | MPC · JPL |
| 531692 | 2012 UC_{180} | — | December 7, 2001 | Kitt Peak | Spacewatch | · | 3.5 km | MPC · JPL |
| 531693 | 2012 UE_{180} | — | November 16, 2001 | Kitt Peak | Spacewatch | VER | 2.9 km | MPC · JPL |
| 531694 | 2012 UM_{180} | — | September 29, 2003 | Kitt Peak | Spacewatch | · | 1.4 km | MPC · JPL |
| 531695 | 2012 UP_{180} | — | October 21, 2012 | Haleakala | Pan-STARRS 1 | · | 1.3 km | MPC · JPL |
| 531696 | 2012 UQ_{180} | — | October 21, 2012 | Haleakala | Pan-STARRS 1 | · | 1.5 km | MPC · JPL |
| 531697 | 2012 UT_{180} | — | September 4, 2007 | Mount Lemmon | Mount Lemmon Survey | HOF | 2.2 km | MPC · JPL |
| 531698 | 2012 UW_{180} | — | October 16, 2012 | Mount Lemmon | Mount Lemmon Survey | · | 2.5 km | MPC · JPL |
| 531699 | 2012 UG_{181} | — | October 18, 2012 | Haleakala | Pan-STARRS 1 | · | 1.7 km | MPC · JPL |
| 531700 | 2012 UU_{181} | — | October 18, 2012 | Haleakala | Pan-STARRS 1 | · | 1.4 km | MPC · JPL |

== 531701–531800 ==
back to top

| Designation | | | Discovery | | | Properties | | Ref |
| Permanent | Provisional | Named after | Date | Site | Discoverer(s) | Category | Diam. | Ref |
|---|---|---|---|---|---|---|---|---|
| 531701 | 2012 UA_{182} | — | October 18, 2012 | Haleakala | Pan-STARRS 1 | · | 1.6 km | MPC · JPL |
| 531702 | 2012 UY_{182} | — | October 21, 2012 | Haleakala | Pan-STARRS 1 | · | 1.5 km | MPC · JPL |
| 531703 | 2012 UT_{183} | — | March 11, 2005 | Mount Lemmon | Mount Lemmon Survey | MRX | 880 m | MPC · JPL |
| 531704 | 2012 UX_{183} | — | December 17, 2009 | Mount Lemmon | Mount Lemmon Survey | · | 1.8 km | MPC · JPL |
| 531705 | 2012 UB_{184} | — | January 3, 2009 | Mount Lemmon | Mount Lemmon Survey | · | 1.7 km | MPC · JPL |
| 531706 | 2012 UE_{184} | — | October 18, 2012 | Mount Lemmon | Mount Lemmon Survey | BAR | 960 m | MPC · JPL |
| 531707 | 2012 UF_{184} | — | July 2, 2005 | Kitt Peak | Spacewatch | · | 3.2 km | MPC · JPL |
| 531708 | 2012 UG_{184} | — | October 20, 2012 | Mount Lemmon | Mount Lemmon Survey | · | 3.6 km | MPC · JPL |
| 531709 | 2012 UH_{184} | — | October 21, 2012 | Mount Lemmon | Mount Lemmon Survey | · | 2.5 km | MPC · JPL |
| 531710 | 2012 UL_{184} | — | September 15, 2007 | Kitt Peak | Spacewatch | · | 1.5 km | MPC · JPL |
| 531711 | 2012 UO_{184} | — | October 17, 2012 | Haleakala | Pan-STARRS 1 | · | 1.4 km | MPC · JPL |
| 531712 | 2012 UT_{184} | — | October 8, 2012 | Kitt Peak | Spacewatch | · | 1.6 km | MPC · JPL |
| 531713 | 2012 UU_{184} | — | October 18, 2012 | Haleakala | Pan-STARRS 1 | KOR | 1.1 km | MPC · JPL |
| 531714 | 2012 UY_{184} | — | October 19, 2012 | Mount Lemmon | Mount Lemmon Survey | · | 2.9 km | MPC · JPL |
| 531715 | 2012 UZ_{184} | — | October 19, 2012 | Mount Lemmon | Mount Lemmon Survey | EOS | 1.9 km | MPC · JPL |
| 531716 | 2012 UA_{185} | — | October 20, 2012 | Haleakala | Pan-STARRS 1 | · | 1.6 km | MPC · JPL |
| 531717 | 2012 UB_{185} | — | October 21, 2012 | Haleakala | Pan-STARRS 1 | · | 1.8 km | MPC · JPL |
| 531718 | 2012 VA | — | November 1, 2012 | Haleakala | Pan-STARRS 1 | H | 500 m | MPC · JPL |
| 531719 | 2012 VL_{3} | — | October 18, 2012 | Haleakala | Pan-STARRS 1 | · | 2.2 km | MPC · JPL |
| 531720 | 2012 VG_{4} | — | March 11, 2005 | Mount Lemmon | Mount Lemmon Survey | · | 1.9 km | MPC · JPL |
| 531721 | 2012 VU_{7} | — | September 20, 2011 | Mount Lemmon | Mount Lemmon Survey | L5 | 7.7 km | MPC · JPL |
| 531722 | 2012 VE_{9} | — | October 18, 2012 | Haleakala | Pan-STARRS 1 | THM | 1.9 km | MPC · JPL |
| 531723 | 2012 VV_{9} | — | September 15, 2012 | Kitt Peak | Spacewatch | · | 2.6 km | MPC · JPL |
| 531724 | 2012 VD_{12} | — | October 18, 2012 | Haleakala | Pan-STARRS 1 | · | 2.6 km | MPC · JPL |
| 531725 | 2012 VO_{14} | — | October 8, 2012 | Mount Lemmon | Mount Lemmon Survey | · | 1.5 km | MPC · JPL |
| 531726 | 2012 VF_{15} | — | November 4, 2012 | Haleakala | Pan-STARRS 1 | · | 2.6 km | MPC · JPL |
| 531727 | 2012 VY_{15} | — | October 22, 2012 | Haleakala | Pan-STARRS 1 | · | 3.2 km | MPC · JPL |
| 531728 | 2012 VJ_{19} | — | October 21, 2012 | Haleakala | Pan-STARRS 1 | · | 1.5 km | MPC · JPL |
| 531729 | 2012 VB_{21} | — | October 18, 2012 | Haleakala | Pan-STARRS 1 | · | 2.2 km | MPC · JPL |
| 531730 | 2012 VK_{23} | — | October 8, 2012 | Mount Lemmon | Mount Lemmon Survey | · | 2.6 km | MPC · JPL |
| 531731 | 2012 VD_{25} | — | October 22, 2012 | Mount Lemmon | Mount Lemmon Survey | · | 2.7 km | MPC · JPL |
| 531732 | 2012 VC_{28} | — | September 16, 2012 | Kitt Peak | Spacewatch | · | 1.5 km | MPC · JPL |
| 531733 | 2012 VF_{30} | — | October 6, 2012 | Mount Lemmon | Mount Lemmon Survey | · | 1.4 km | MPC · JPL |
| 531734 | 2012 VJ_{32} | — | October 21, 2012 | Haleakala | Pan-STARRS 1 | · | 2.3 km | MPC · JPL |
| 531735 | 2012 VZ_{37} | — | September 27, 2006 | Kitt Peak | Spacewatch | THB | 1.8 km | MPC · JPL |
| 531736 | 2012 VK_{38} | — | August 16, 2006 | Siding Spring | SSS | T_{j} (2.96) | 3.3 km | MPC · JPL |
| 531737 | 2012 VF_{42} | — | November 6, 2012 | Kitt Peak | Spacewatch | · | 2.2 km | MPC · JPL |
| 531738 | 2012 VG_{42} | — | May 5, 2011 | Mount Lemmon | Mount Lemmon Survey | H | 440 m | MPC · JPL |
| 531739 | 2012 VS_{42} | — | November 6, 2012 | Mount Lemmon | Mount Lemmon Survey | LUT | 4.0 km | MPC · JPL |
| 531740 | 2012 VZ_{43} | — | September 19, 2012 | Mount Lemmon | Mount Lemmon Survey | · | 2.3 km | MPC · JPL |
| 531741 | 2012 VA_{44} | — | November 17, 2007 | Kitt Peak | Spacewatch | · | 1.9 km | MPC · JPL |
| 531742 | 2012 VH_{48} | — | October 18, 2012 | Haleakala | Pan-STARRS 1 | · | 2.2 km | MPC · JPL |
| 531743 | 2012 VP_{52} | — | October 22, 2012 | Haleakala | Pan-STARRS 1 | · | 3.5 km | MPC · JPL |
| 531744 | 2012 VS_{57} | — | December 17, 2007 | Kitt Peak | Spacewatch | · | 1.7 km | MPC · JPL |
| 531745 | 2012 VW_{57} | — | June 4, 2011 | Mount Lemmon | Mount Lemmon Survey | · | 1.2 km | MPC · JPL |
| 531746 | 2012 VM_{59} | — | October 21, 2012 | Haleakala | Pan-STARRS 1 | · | 1.8 km | MPC · JPL |
| 531747 | 2012 VS_{59} | — | October 21, 2012 | Haleakala | Pan-STARRS 1 | · | 1.5 km | MPC · JPL |
| 531748 | 2012 VG_{62} | — | December 10, 2001 | Kitt Peak | Spacewatch | · | 2.8 km | MPC · JPL |
| 531749 | 2012 VL_{70} | — | October 21, 2012 | Haleakala | Pan-STARRS 1 | · | 2.2 km | MPC · JPL |
| 531750 | 2012 VY_{73} | — | October 21, 2012 | Haleakala | Pan-STARRS 1 | MRX | 1.1 km | MPC · JPL |
| 531751 | 2012 VZ_{75} | — | November 13, 2012 | Mount Lemmon | Mount Lemmon Survey | · | 2.3 km | MPC · JPL |
| 531752 | 2012 VB_{89} | — | October 21, 2012 | Haleakala | Pan-STARRS 1 | · | 2.0 km | MPC · JPL |
| 531753 | 2012 VP_{89} | — | October 23, 2012 | Mount Lemmon | Mount Lemmon Survey | · | 1.7 km | MPC · JPL |
| 531754 | 2012 VQ_{92} | — | October 8, 2007 | Mount Lemmon | Mount Lemmon Survey | · | 1.4 km | MPC · JPL |
| 531755 | 2012 VM_{93} | — | October 9, 2012 | Mount Lemmon | Mount Lemmon Survey | · | 2.1 km | MPC · JPL |
| 531756 | 2012 VK_{97} | — | April 27, 2011 | Mount Lemmon | Mount Lemmon Survey | H | 550 m | MPC · JPL |
| 531757 | 2012 VQ_{100} | — | September 2, 2012 | Haleakala | Pan-STARRS 1 | · | 1.9 km | MPC · JPL |
| 531758 | 2012 VR_{100} | — | October 17, 2012 | Mount Lemmon | Mount Lemmon Survey | H | 560 m | MPC · JPL |
| 531759 | 2012 VC_{101} | — | October 21, 2012 | Mount Lemmon | Mount Lemmon Survey | · | 2.2 km | MPC · JPL |
| 531760 | 2012 VS_{102} | — | October 23, 2012 | Mount Lemmon | Mount Lemmon Survey | · | 1.5 km | MPC · JPL |
| 531761 | 2012 VX_{103} | — | October 21, 2012 | Haleakala | Pan-STARRS 1 | VER | 2.5 km | MPC · JPL |
| 531762 | 2012 VZ_{106} | — | November 4, 2012 | Kitt Peak | Spacewatch | · | 1.8 km | MPC · JPL |
| 531763 | 2012 VB_{108} | — | March 1, 2008 | Mount Lemmon | Mount Lemmon Survey | · | 2.3 km | MPC · JPL |
| 531764 | 2012 VN_{114} | — | October 4, 2006 | Mount Lemmon | Mount Lemmon Survey | · | 3.5 km | MPC · JPL |
| 531765 | 2012 VO_{114} | — | November 7, 2012 | Haleakala | Pan-STARRS 1 | · | 1.4 km | MPC · JPL |
| 531766 | 2012 VP_{114} | — | November 14, 2012 | Kitt Peak | Spacewatch | · | 1.4 km | MPC · JPL |
| 531767 | 2012 VS_{114} | — | November 6, 2012 | Kitt Peak | Spacewatch | · | 2.6 km | MPC · JPL |
| 531768 | 2012 VT_{114} | — | November 8, 2007 | Kitt Peak | Spacewatch | · | 1.7 km | MPC · JPL |
| 531769 | 2012 VU_{114} | — | December 31, 2008 | Kitt Peak | Spacewatch | · | 1.7 km | MPC · JPL |
| 531770 | 2012 VJ_{115} | — | November 12, 2012 | Mount Lemmon | Mount Lemmon Survey | · | 2.7 km | MPC · JPL |
| 531771 | 2012 VM_{115} | — | November 14, 2012 | Kitt Peak | Spacewatch | · | 1.5 km | MPC · JPL |
| 531772 | 2012 VR_{115} | — | October 31, 2006 | Kitt Peak | Spacewatch | · | 2.9 km | MPC · JPL |
| 531773 | 2012 VT_{115} | — | October 22, 2006 | Mount Lemmon | Mount Lemmon Survey | · | 2.4 km | MPC · JPL |
| 531774 | 2012 VV_{115} | — | November 7, 2012 | Haleakala | Pan-STARRS 1 | · | 1.6 km | MPC · JPL |
| 531775 | 2012 VY_{115} | — | December 19, 2007 | Mount Lemmon | Mount Lemmon Survey | EOS | 1.9 km | MPC · JPL |
| 531776 | 2012 VZ_{115} | — | November 13, 2012 | Mount Lemmon | Mount Lemmon Survey | · | 1.5 km | MPC · JPL |
| 531777 | 2012 VA_{116} | — | November 15, 2012 | Catalina | CSS | · | 2.2 km | MPC · JPL |
| 531778 | 2012 WR_{1} | — | September 16, 2012 | Mount Lemmon | Mount Lemmon Survey | · | 3.0 km | MPC · JPL |
| 531779 | 2012 WX_{2} | — | October 12, 2007 | Mount Lemmon | Mount Lemmon Survey | · | 1.7 km | MPC · JPL |
| 531780 | 2012 WE_{6} | — | September 27, 2006 | Catalina | CSS | T_{j} (2.98) · EUP | 5.0 km | MPC · JPL |
| 531781 | 2012 WP_{12} | — | October 9, 2012 | Mount Lemmon | Mount Lemmon Survey | · | 2.2 km | MPC · JPL |
| 531782 | 2012 WY_{16} | — | April 21, 2006 | Catalina | CSS | H | 490 m | MPC · JPL |
| 531783 | 2012 WN_{23} | — | December 8, 1998 | Kitt Peak | Spacewatch | H | 510 m | MPC · JPL |
| 531784 | 2012 WZ_{23} | — | October 21, 2012 | Haleakala | Pan-STARRS 1 | · | 2.9 km | MPC · JPL |
| 531785 | 2012 WS_{25} | — | October 19, 2012 | Mount Lemmon | Mount Lemmon Survey | EOS | 1.6 km | MPC · JPL |
| 531786 | 2012 WA_{30} | — | October 25, 2012 | Kitt Peak | Spacewatch | EOS | 1.7 km | MPC · JPL |
| 531787 | 2012 WV_{31} | — | October 13, 2012 | Kitt Peak | Spacewatch | · | 3.2 km | MPC · JPL |
| 531788 | 2012 WB_{33} | — | October 21, 2012 | Haleakala | Pan-STARRS 1 | T_{j} (2.98) | 2.7 km | MPC · JPL |
| 531789 | 2012 WG_{33} | — | October 23, 2012 | Mount Lemmon | Mount Lemmon Survey | EOS | 1.7 km | MPC · JPL |
| 531790 | 2012 WG_{34} | — | November 26, 2012 | Mount Lemmon | Mount Lemmon Survey | · | 2.6 km | MPC · JPL |
| 531791 | 2012 WT_{36} | — | September 25, 2012 | Mount Lemmon | Mount Lemmon Survey | · | 2.3 km | MPC · JPL |
| 531792 | 2012 WX_{36} | — | October 7, 2007 | Kitt Peak | Spacewatch | KOR | 1.4 km | MPC · JPL |
| 531793 | 2012 WZ_{36} | — | November 23, 2012 | Kitt Peak | Spacewatch | · | 2.0 km | MPC · JPL |
| 531794 | 2012 WB_{37} | — | August 24, 2011 | Haleakala | Pan-STARRS 1 | · | 2.5 km | MPC · JPL |
| 531795 | 2012 WC_{37} | — | November 8, 2007 | Kitt Peak | Spacewatch | · | 1.8 km | MPC · JPL |
| 531796 | 2012 XB_{3} | — | November 7, 2012 | Kitt Peak | Spacewatch | · | 2.0 km | MPC · JPL |
| 531797 | 2012 XS_{11} | — | December 15, 2007 | Mount Lemmon | Mount Lemmon Survey | · | 2.2 km | MPC · JPL |
| 531798 | 2012 XE_{18} | — | October 18, 2006 | Kitt Peak | Spacewatch | · | 2.8 km | MPC · JPL |
| 531799 | 2012 XR_{21} | — | November 12, 2012 | Mount Lemmon | Mount Lemmon Survey | · | 1.4 km | MPC · JPL |
| 531800 | 2012 XS_{25} | — | October 22, 2012 | Haleakala | Pan-STARRS 1 | · | 1.7 km | MPC · JPL |

== 531801–531900 ==
back to top

| Designation | | | Discovery | | | Properties | | Ref |
| Permanent | Provisional | Named after | Date | Site | Discoverer(s) | Category | Diam. | Ref |
|---|---|---|---|---|---|---|---|---|
| 531801 | 2012 XT_{28} | — | November 9, 2007 | Kitt Peak | Spacewatch | · | 1.6 km | MPC · JPL |
| 531802 | 2012 XB_{32} | — | November 6, 2012 | Mount Lemmon | Mount Lemmon Survey | EOS | 1.6 km | MPC · JPL |
| 531803 | 2012 XH_{32} | — | November 23, 2012 | Kitt Peak | Spacewatch | EUN | 1.2 km | MPC · JPL |
| 531804 | 2012 XV_{33} | — | November 23, 2006 | Kitt Peak | Spacewatch | CYB | 2.5 km | MPC · JPL |
| 531805 | 2012 XY_{41} | — | December 3, 2012 | Mount Lemmon | Mount Lemmon Survey | · | 1.8 km | MPC · JPL |
| 531806 | 2012 XO_{45} | — | October 20, 2012 | Mount Lemmon | Mount Lemmon Survey | URS | 2.7 km | MPC · JPL |
| 531807 | 2012 XG_{48} | — | December 5, 2012 | Mount Lemmon | Mount Lemmon Survey | · | 1.7 km | MPC · JPL |
| 531808 | 2012 XR_{50} | — | July 28, 2011 | Haleakala | Pan-STARRS 1 | HOF | 2.5 km | MPC · JPL |
| 531809 | 2012 XT_{52} | — | December 6, 2012 | Kitt Peak | Spacewatch | · | 2.6 km | MPC · JPL |
| 531810 | 2012 XF_{53} | — | July 2, 2011 | Mount Lemmon | Mount Lemmon Survey | · | 1.0 km | MPC · JPL |
| 531811 | 2012 XW_{61} | — | July 28, 2011 | Haleakala | Pan-STARRS 1 | · | 2.0 km | MPC · JPL |
| 531812 | 2012 XL_{64} | — | December 4, 2012 | Mount Lemmon | Mount Lemmon Survey | · | 1.6 km | MPC · JPL |
| 531813 | 2012 XW_{64} | — | October 26, 2001 | Kitt Peak | Spacewatch | · | 2.0 km | MPC · JPL |
| 531814 | 2012 XP_{65} | — | June 13, 2005 | Mount Lemmon | Mount Lemmon Survey | · | 2.2 km | MPC · JPL |
| 531815 | 2012 XT_{66} | — | July 28, 2011 | Haleakala | Pan-STARRS 1 | · | 1.8 km | MPC · JPL |
| 531816 | 2012 XA_{69} | — | November 5, 2012 | Kitt Peak | Spacewatch | CYB | 3.3 km | MPC · JPL |
| 531817 | 2012 XP_{95} | — | January 18, 2008 | Mount Lemmon | Mount Lemmon Survey | · | 2.7 km | MPC · JPL |
| 531818 | 2012 XP_{109} | — | September 24, 2007 | Kitt Peak | Spacewatch | · | 1.6 km | MPC · JPL |
| 531819 | 2012 XK_{115} | — | October 17, 2012 | Mount Lemmon | Mount Lemmon Survey | · | 1.7 km | MPC · JPL |
| 531820 | 2012 XK_{122} | — | December 9, 2012 | Haleakala | Pan-STARRS 1 | EOS | 1.7 km | MPC · JPL |
| 531821 | 2012 XA_{127} | — | December 22, 2008 | Mount Lemmon | Mount Lemmon Survey | · | 2.0 km | MPC · JPL |
| 531822 | 2012 XL_{129} | — | September 18, 2006 | Socorro | LINEAR | T_{j} (2.95) | 2.8 km | MPC · JPL |
| 531823 | 2012 XP_{139} | — | December 17, 2007 | Kitt Peak | Spacewatch | EOS | 2.3 km | MPC · JPL |
| 531824 | 2012 XV_{142} | — | December 7, 2012 | Haleakala | Pan-STARRS 1 | · | 980 m | MPC · JPL |
| 531825 | 2012 XJ_{146} | — | October 23, 2012 | Mount Lemmon | Mount Lemmon Survey | · | 2.1 km | MPC · JPL |
| 531826 | 2012 XU_{146} | — | November 7, 2012 | Mount Lemmon | Mount Lemmon Survey | · | 2.8 km | MPC · JPL |
| 531827 | 2012 XF_{147} | — | December 30, 2007 | Mount Lemmon | Mount Lemmon Survey | THM | 1.7 km | MPC · JPL |
| 531828 | 2012 XR_{154} | — | December 9, 2001 | Socorro | LINEAR | · | 2.9 km | MPC · JPL |
| 531829 | 2012 XK_{158} | — | April 28, 2008 | Mount Lemmon | Mount Lemmon Survey | H | 400 m | MPC · JPL |
| 531830 | 2012 XA_{159} | — | May 11, 2003 | Kitt Peak | Spacewatch | · | 3.2 km | MPC · JPL |
| 531831 | 2012 XM_{159} | — | December 3, 2012 | Mount Lemmon | Mount Lemmon Survey | · | 3.3 km | MPC · JPL |
| 531832 | 2012 XP_{159} | — | July 21, 2010 | WISE | WISE | EUP | 6.1 km | MPC · JPL |
| 531833 | 2012 XQ_{159} | — | December 3, 2012 | Mount Lemmon | Mount Lemmon Survey | · | 2.2 km | MPC · JPL |
| 531834 | 2012 XR_{159} | — | May 7, 2010 | Mount Lemmon | Mount Lemmon Survey | · | 2.8 km | MPC · JPL |
| 531835 | 2012 XT_{159} | — | December 9, 2012 | Haleakala | Pan-STARRS 1 | EOS | 1.7 km | MPC · JPL |
| 531836 | 2012 YK_{2} | — | March 25, 2008 | Kitt Peak | Spacewatch | · | 2.3 km | MPC · JPL |
| 531837 | 2012 YB_{7} | — | September 28, 2009 | Mount Lemmon | Mount Lemmon Survey | H | 560 m | MPC · JPL |
| 531838 | 2012 YA_{10} | — | October 31, 2006 | Mount Lemmon | Mount Lemmon Survey | · | 2.1 km | MPC · JPL |
| 531839 | 2012 YH_{10} | — | December 18, 2007 | Mount Lemmon | Mount Lemmon Survey | · | 3.2 km | MPC · JPL |
| 531840 | 2012 YA_{11} | — | December 23, 2012 | Haleakala | Pan-STARRS 1 | · | 1.6 km | MPC · JPL |
| 531841 | 2012 YN_{11} | — | February 8, 2008 | Kitt Peak | Spacewatch | THM | 1.7 km | MPC · JPL |
| 531842 | 2012 YW_{11} | — | September 20, 2011 | Kitt Peak | Spacewatch | · | 2.5 km | MPC · JPL |
| 531843 | 2012 YX_{11} | — | December 22, 2012 | Haleakala | Pan-STARRS 1 | EOS | 1.9 km | MPC · JPL |
| 531844 | 2012 YY_{11} | — | December 23, 2012 | Haleakala | Pan-STARRS 1 | · | 2.4 km | MPC · JPL |
| 531845 | 2012 YZ_{11} | — | April 23, 2007 | Mount Lemmon | Mount Lemmon Survey | · | 620 m | MPC · JPL |
| 531846 | 2013 AE_{9} | — | February 17, 2010 | Kitt Peak | Spacewatch | · | 630 m | MPC · JPL |
| 531847 | 2013 AY_{12} | — | January 3, 2013 | Mount Lemmon | Mount Lemmon Survey | · | 2.1 km | MPC · JPL |
| 531848 | 2013 AS_{18} | — | October 23, 2011 | Haleakala | Pan-STARRS 1 | · | 2.8 km | MPC · JPL |
| 531849 | 2013 AG_{22} | — | November 23, 2006 | Mount Lemmon | Mount Lemmon Survey | · | 2.2 km | MPC · JPL |
| 531850 | 2013 AW_{32} | — | July 28, 2011 | Haleakala | Pan-STARRS 1 | · | 2.8 km | MPC · JPL |
| 531851 | 2013 AN_{33} | — | December 13, 2012 | Mount Lemmon | Mount Lemmon Survey | · | 3.0 km | MPC · JPL |
| 531852 | 2013 AK_{38} | — | December 9, 2012 | Mount Lemmon | Mount Lemmon Survey | · | 2.2 km | MPC · JPL |
| 531853 | 2013 AT_{43} | — | September 25, 2011 | Haleakala | Pan-STARRS 1 | LIX | 3.6 km | MPC · JPL |
| 531854 | 2013 AJ_{44} | — | January 5, 2013 | Mount Lemmon | Mount Lemmon Survey | · | 2.1 km | MPC · JPL |
| 531855 | 2013 AP_{46} | — | January 6, 2013 | Kitt Peak | Spacewatch | · | 3.9 km | MPC · JPL |
| 531856 | 2013 AJ_{56} | — | December 23, 2012 | Haleakala | Pan-STARRS 1 | · | 2.5 km | MPC · JPL |
| 531857 | 2013 AF_{58} | — | January 6, 2013 | Kitt Peak | Spacewatch | · | 3.0 km | MPC · JPL |
| 531858 | 2013 AQ_{67} | — | April 7, 2008 | Catalina | CSS | · | 2.6 km | MPC · JPL |
| 531859 | 2013 AN_{70} | — | September 20, 2011 | Haleakala | Pan-STARRS 1 | · | 2.5 km | MPC · JPL |
| 531860 | 2013 AZ_{70} | — | January 10, 2013 | Haleakala | Pan-STARRS 1 | · | 2.6 km | MPC · JPL |
| 531861 | 2013 AT_{74} | — | February 8, 2002 | Socorro | LINEAR | · | 2.9 km | MPC · JPL |
| 531862 | 2013 AX_{83} | — | December 23, 2012 | Haleakala | Pan-STARRS 1 | · | 2.8 km | MPC · JPL |
| 531863 | 2013 AS_{87} | — | December 23, 2012 | Haleakala | Pan-STARRS 1 | · | 3.4 km | MPC · JPL |
| 531864 | 2013 AR_{91} | — | June 3, 2010 | WISE | WISE | PHO | 2.3 km | MPC · JPL |
| 531865 | 2013 AF_{95} | — | January 8, 2002 | Socorro | LINEAR | · | 2.9 km | MPC · JPL |
| 531866 | 2013 AY_{95} | — | February 12, 2008 | Mount Lemmon | Mount Lemmon Survey | · | 3.3 km | MPC · JPL |
| 531867 | 2013 AU_{96} | — | December 23, 2012 | Haleakala | Pan-STARRS 1 | · | 3.1 km | MPC · JPL |
| 531868 | 2013 AK_{97} | — | January 5, 2013 | Mount Lemmon | Mount Lemmon Survey | T_{j} (2.98) · EUP | 2.7 km | MPC · JPL |
| 531869 | 2013 AF_{102} | — | November 12, 2012 | Mount Lemmon | Mount Lemmon Survey | · | 750 m | MPC · JPL |
| 531870 | 2013 AU_{106} | — | December 9, 2012 | Mount Lemmon | Mount Lemmon Survey | · | 2.7 km | MPC · JPL |
| 531871 | 2013 AV_{109} | — | July 28, 2011 | Haleakala | Pan-STARRS 1 | · | 640 m | MPC · JPL |
| 531872 | 2013 AN_{115} | — | December 6, 2012 | Mount Lemmon | Mount Lemmon Survey | · | 780 m | MPC · JPL |
| 531873 | 2013 AZ_{117} | — | January 3, 2013 | Haleakala | Pan-STARRS 1 | · | 3.3 km | MPC · JPL |
| 531874 | 2013 AK_{118} | — | November 3, 2011 | Mount Lemmon | Mount Lemmon Survey | · | 3.1 km | MPC · JPL |
| 531875 | 2013 AN_{118} | — | January 3, 2013 | Haleakala | Pan-STARRS 1 | · | 4.0 km | MPC · JPL |
| 531876 | 2013 AN_{138} | — | March 8, 2008 | Kitt Peak | Spacewatch | · | 1.7 km | MPC · JPL |
| 531877 | 2013 AG_{148} | — | March 1, 2008 | Kitt Peak | Spacewatch | · | 2.7 km | MPC · JPL |
| 531878 | 2013 AT_{150} | — | September 24, 2011 | Mount Lemmon | Mount Lemmon Survey | · | 1.3 km | MPC · JPL |
| 531879 | 2013 AN_{160} | — | October 25, 2011 | Haleakala | Pan-STARRS 1 | EOS | 1.6 km | MPC · JPL |
| 531880 | 2013 AQ_{166} | — | November 12, 2006 | Mount Lemmon | Mount Lemmon Survey | · | 1.5 km | MPC · JPL |
| 531881 | 2013 AW_{166} | — | October 7, 2005 | Mount Lemmon | Mount Lemmon Survey | VER | 2.3 km | MPC · JPL |
| 531882 | 2013 AN_{167} | — | September 26, 2005 | Kitt Peak | Spacewatch | · | 2.7 km | MPC · JPL |
| 531883 | 2013 AW_{170} | — | November 15, 2006 | Kitt Peak | Spacewatch | · | 2.4 km | MPC · JPL |
| 531884 | 2013 AZ_{172} | — | November 21, 2006 | Mount Lemmon | Mount Lemmon Survey | EOS | 1.9 km | MPC · JPL |
| 531885 | 2013 AS_{184} | — | October 24, 2011 | Haleakala | Pan-STARRS 1 | · | 2.3 km | MPC · JPL |
| 531886 | 2013 AZ_{184} | — | October 26, 2011 | Haleakala | Pan-STARRS 1 | VER | 3.0 km | MPC · JPL |
| 531887 | 2013 AB_{185} | — | January 10, 2013 | Haleakala | Pan-STARRS 1 | · | 2.7 km | MPC · JPL |
| 531888 | 2013 AX_{185} | — | September 25, 2011 | Haleakala | Pan-STARRS 1 | VER | 2.2 km | MPC · JPL |
| 531889 | 2013 AW_{186} | — | January 10, 2013 | Haleakala | Pan-STARRS 1 | · | 2.8 km | MPC · JPL |
| 531890 | 2013 AD_{187} | — | January 10, 2013 | Haleakala | Pan-STARRS 1 | ARM | 2.9 km | MPC · JPL |
| 531891 | 2013 AJ_{187} | — | January 10, 2013 | Haleakala | Pan-STARRS 1 | · | 2.2 km | MPC · JPL |
| 531892 | 2013 AG_{188} | — | January 10, 2013 | Haleakala | Pan-STARRS 1 | VER | 2.3 km | MPC · JPL |
| 531893 | 2013 AR_{188} | — | January 5, 2013 | Mount Lemmon | Mount Lemmon Survey | · | 720 m | MPC · JPL |
| 531894 | 2013 AT_{188} | — | January 9, 1997 | Kitt Peak | Spacewatch | · | 2.5 km | MPC · JPL |
| 531895 | 2013 BP_{7} | — | January 8, 2013 | Kitt Peak | Spacewatch | · | 1.6 km | MPC · JPL |
| 531896 | 2013 BM_{8} | — | September 24, 2011 | Haleakala | Pan-STARRS 1 | EOS | 1.8 km | MPC · JPL |
| 531897 | 2013 BX_{12} | — | March 8, 2008 | Mount Lemmon | Mount Lemmon Survey | · | 1.7 km | MPC · JPL |
| 531898 | 2013 BE_{18} | — | January 16, 2013 | Haleakala | Pan-STARRS 1 | AMO | 220 m | MPC · JPL |
| 531899 | 2013 BE_{19} | — | January 18, 2013 | Catalina | CSS | ATE · PHA · slow | 400 m | MPC · JPL |
| 531900 | 2013 BF_{21} | — | February 9, 2008 | Kitt Peak | Spacewatch | · | 2.8 km | MPC · JPL |

== 531901–532000 ==
back to top

| Designation | | | Discovery | | | Properties | | Ref |
| Permanent | Provisional | Named after | Date | Site | Discoverer(s) | Category | Diam. | Ref |
|---|---|---|---|---|---|---|---|---|
| 531901 | 2013 BL_{21} | — | March 26, 2008 | Mount Lemmon | Mount Lemmon Survey | · | 2.2 km | MPC · JPL |
| 531902 | 2013 BQ_{21} | — | December 23, 2012 | Haleakala | Pan-STARRS 1 | · | 2.1 km | MPC · JPL |
| 531903 | 2013 BG_{22} | — | January 3, 2013 | Haleakala | Pan-STARRS 1 | T_{j} (2.99) | 3.3 km | MPC · JPL |
| 531904 | 2013 BX_{23} | — | January 7, 2013 | Kitt Peak | Spacewatch | · | 3.7 km | MPC · JPL |
| 531905 | 2013 BW_{29} | — | January 16, 2013 | Haleakala | Pan-STARRS 1 | EOS | 1.6 km | MPC · JPL |
| 531906 | 2013 BW_{35} | — | August 26, 2011 | Haleakala | Pan-STARRS 1 | · | 1.6 km | MPC · JPL |
| 531907 | 2013 BC_{39} | — | December 9, 2012 | Mount Lemmon | Mount Lemmon Survey | · | 670 m | MPC · JPL |
| 531908 | 2013 BM_{59} | — | March 11, 2008 | Mount Lemmon | Mount Lemmon Survey | · | 3.1 km | MPC · JPL |
| 531909 | 2013 BB_{62} | — | January 18, 2013 | Kitt Peak | Spacewatch | · | 2.8 km | MPC · JPL |
| 531910 | 2013 BX_{70} | — | March 7, 2008 | Kitt Peak | Spacewatch | TIR | 1.9 km | MPC · JPL |
| 531911 | 2013 BD_{71} | — | October 21, 2011 | Mount Lemmon | Mount Lemmon Survey | · | 1.7 km | MPC · JPL |
| 531912 | 2013 BZ_{71} | — | January 19, 2002 | Kitt Peak | Spacewatch | LIX | 2.4 km | MPC · JPL |
| 531913 | 2013 BF_{72} | — | August 26, 2011 | Haleakala | Pan-STARRS 1 | · | 880 m | MPC · JPL |
| 531914 | 2013 BW_{76} | — | January 22, 2013 | Mount Lemmon | Mount Lemmon Survey | APO · PHA | 740 m | MPC · JPL |
| 531915 | 2013 BW_{78} | — | January 5, 2013 | Mount Lemmon | Mount Lemmon Survey | · | 2.5 km | MPC · JPL |
| 531916 | 2013 BF_{79} | — | February 29, 2008 | Mount Lemmon | Mount Lemmon Survey | · | 2.3 km | MPC · JPL |
| 531917 | 2013 BN_{82} | — | January 17, 2013 | Haleakala | Pan-STARRS 1 | res · 4:7 | 173 km | MPC · JPL |
| 531918 | 2013 BC_{83} | — | January 10, 2007 | Mount Lemmon | Mount Lemmon Survey | · | 2.7 km | MPC · JPL |
| 531919 | 2013 BZ_{83} | — | September 5, 2008 | Kitt Peak | Spacewatch | · | 510 m | MPC · JPL |
| 531920 | 2013 CW_{3} | — | January 9, 2007 | Kitt Peak | Spacewatch | · | 2.7 km | MPC · JPL |
| 531921 | 2013 CL_{4} | — | January 10, 2013 | Haleakala | Pan-STARRS 1 | · | 2.5 km | MPC · JPL |
| 531922 | 2013 CF_{7} | — | January 10, 2013 | Haleakala | Pan-STARRS 1 | · | 3.2 km | MPC · JPL |
| 531923 | 2013 CG_{8} | — | January 10, 2013 | Haleakala | Pan-STARRS 1 | · | 810 m | MPC · JPL |
| 531924 | 2013 CS_{25} | — | February 3, 2013 | Haleakala | Pan-STARRS 1 | · | 2.2 km | MPC · JPL |
| 531925 | 2013 CT_{25} | — | March 6, 2008 | Mount Lemmon | Mount Lemmon Survey | EOS | 1.8 km | MPC · JPL |
| 531926 | 2013 CK_{30} | — | January 5, 2013 | Kitt Peak | Spacewatch | TIR | 2.2 km | MPC · JPL |
| 531927 | 2013 CE_{39} | — | January 9, 2008 | Mount Lemmon | Mount Lemmon Survey | · | 2.6 km | MPC · JPL |
| 531928 | 2013 CZ_{40} | — | October 25, 2011 | Haleakala | Pan-STARRS 1 | VER | 2.4 km | MPC · JPL |
| 531929 | 2013 CQ_{41} | — | February 3, 2013 | Haleakala | Pan-STARRS 1 | · | 2.2 km | MPC · JPL |
| 531930 | 2013 CK_{43} | — | January 9, 2013 | Kitt Peak | Spacewatch | · | 3.0 km | MPC · JPL |
| 531931 | 2013 CX_{44} | — | January 19, 2013 | Kitt Peak | Spacewatch | · | 920 m | MPC · JPL |
| 531932 | 2013 CQ_{49} | — | February 6, 2013 | Kitt Peak | Spacewatch | URS | 3.4 km | MPC · JPL |
| 531933 | 2013 CN_{50} | — | October 20, 2012 | Mount Lemmon | Mount Lemmon Survey | · | 1.8 km | MPC · JPL |
| 531934 | 2013 CD_{53} | — | March 28, 2008 | Kitt Peak | Spacewatch | · | 1.9 km | MPC · JPL |
| 531935 | 2013 CJ_{55} | — | January 5, 2013 | Kitt Peak | Spacewatch | · | 2.9 km | MPC · JPL |
| 531936 | 2013 CZ_{66} | — | December 10, 2005 | Kitt Peak | Spacewatch | · | 700 m | MPC · JPL |
| 531937 | 2013 CJ_{67} | — | February 8, 2013 | Haleakala | Pan-STARRS 1 | TIR | 2.3 km | MPC · JPL |
| 531938 | 2013 CM_{71} | — | January 10, 2013 | Haleakala | Pan-STARRS 1 | · | 2.4 km | MPC · JPL |
| 531939 | 2013 CZ_{71} | — | December 21, 2012 | Mount Lemmon | Mount Lemmon Survey | · | 580 m | MPC · JPL |
| 531940 | 2013 CZ_{75} | — | December 24, 2006 | Kitt Peak | Spacewatch | THB | 2.3 km | MPC · JPL |
| 531941 | 2013 CW_{80} | — | January 8, 2013 | Mount Lemmon | Mount Lemmon Survey | PHO | 1.1 km | MPC · JPL |
| 531942 | 2013 CV_{82} | — | February 3, 2013 | Haleakala | Pan-STARRS 1 | centaur | 20 km | MPC · JPL |
| 531943 | 2013 CD_{83} | — | March 30, 2008 | Catalina | CSS | · | 2.0 km | MPC · JPL |
| 531944 | 2013 CU_{83} | — | February 10, 2013 | Haleakala | Pan-STARRS 1 | AMO · PHA | 190 m | MPC · JPL |
| 531945 | 2013 CW_{85} | — | February 6, 2013 | Kitt Peak | Spacewatch | · | 670 m | MPC · JPL |
| 531946 | 2013 CK_{86} | — | November 15, 2006 | Kitt Peak | Spacewatch | TIR | 2.2 km | MPC · JPL |
| 531947 | 2013 CV_{95} | — | December 26, 2006 | Kitt Peak | Spacewatch | · | 1.8 km | MPC · JPL |
| 531948 | 2013 CX_{97} | — | February 8, 2013 | Haleakala | Pan-STARRS 1 | · | 740 m | MPC · JPL |
| 531949 | 2013 CA_{102} | — | January 5, 2013 | Kitt Peak | Spacewatch | (5931) | 2.9 km | MPC · JPL |
| 531950 | 2013 CN_{104} | — | November 1, 2011 | Kitt Peak | Spacewatch | · | 2.2 km | MPC · JPL |
| 531951 | 2013 CX_{109} | — | September 13, 2004 | Kitt Peak | Spacewatch | · | 800 m | MPC · JPL |
| 531952 | 2013 CW_{111} | — | February 9, 2013 | Haleakala | Pan-STARRS 1 | · | 2.1 km | MPC · JPL |
| 531953 | 2013 CW_{113} | — | February 9, 2008 | Mount Lemmon | Mount Lemmon Survey | · | 2.1 km | MPC · JPL |
| 531954 | 2013 CZ_{123} | — | June 9, 2007 | Kitt Peak | Spacewatch | · | 710 m | MPC · JPL |
| 531955 | 2013 CM_{132} | — | February 14, 2013 | Haleakala | Pan-STARRS 1 | · | 580 m | MPC · JPL |
| 531956 | 2013 CP_{141} | — | February 9, 2013 | Haleakala | Pan-STARRS 1 | · | 3.0 km | MPC · JPL |
| 531957 | 2013 CH_{147} | — | September 26, 2011 | Mount Lemmon | Mount Lemmon Survey | T_{j} (2.98) | 2.7 km | MPC · JPL |
| 531958 | 2013 CC_{148} | — | February 1, 2013 | Kitt Peak | Spacewatch | LIX | 2.9 km | MPC · JPL |
| 531959 | 2013 CB_{165} | — | February 5, 2013 | Kitt Peak | Spacewatch | · | 2.6 km | MPC · JPL |
| 531960 | 2013 CL_{167} | — | February 14, 2013 | Mount Lemmon | Mount Lemmon Survey | · | 3.0 km | MPC · JPL |
| 531961 | 2013 CS_{170} | — | February 7, 2013 | Kitt Peak | Spacewatch | · | 680 m | MPC · JPL |
| 531962 | 2013 CM_{174} | — | February 15, 2013 | Haleakala | Pan-STARRS 1 | · | 580 m | MPC · JPL |
| 531963 | 2013 CV_{174} | — | February 8, 2013 | Kitt Peak | Spacewatch | 3:2 | 4.9 km | MPC · JPL |
| 531964 | 2013 CK_{175} | — | September 24, 2011 | Haleakala | Pan-STARRS 1 | · | 2.1 km | MPC · JPL |
| 531965 | 2013 CV_{175} | — | January 9, 2013 | Mount Lemmon | Mount Lemmon Survey | · | 2.7 km | MPC · JPL |
| 531966 | 2013 CR_{176} | — | January 24, 2007 | Kitt Peak | Spacewatch | · | 2.6 km | MPC · JPL |
| 531967 | 2013 CX_{177} | — | February 13, 2008 | Mount Lemmon | Mount Lemmon Survey | HYG | 2.2 km | MPC · JPL |
| 531968 | 2013 CK_{179} | — | January 20, 2013 | Kitt Peak | Spacewatch | · | 3.6 km | MPC · JPL |
| 531969 | 2013 CW_{180} | — | March 27, 2008 | Mount Lemmon | Mount Lemmon Survey | EUP | 3.7 km | MPC · JPL |
| 531970 | 2013 CM_{181} | — | February 8, 2013 | XuYi | PMO NEO Survey Program | CYB | 3.6 km | MPC · JPL |
| 531971 | 2013 CX_{181} | — | January 16, 2013 | Mount Lemmon | Mount Lemmon Survey | · | 2.6 km | MPC · JPL |
| 531972 | 2013 CB_{182} | — | October 7, 2005 | Kitt Peak | Spacewatch | · | 3.0 km | MPC · JPL |
| 531973 | 2013 CS_{182} | — | November 27, 2006 | Mount Lemmon | Mount Lemmon Survey | · | 2.9 km | MPC · JPL |
| 531974 | 2013 CY_{186} | — | September 30, 2005 | Mount Lemmon | Mount Lemmon Survey | · | 660 m | MPC · JPL |
| 531975 | 2013 CW_{195} | — | December 22, 2006 | Kitt Peak | Spacewatch | THM | 1.9 km | MPC · JPL |
| 531976 | 2013 CC_{196} | — | January 10, 2007 | Kitt Peak | Spacewatch | · | 2.2 km | MPC · JPL |
| 531977 | 2013 CP_{197} | — | February 8, 2013 | Haleakala | Pan-STARRS 1 | · | 2.5 km | MPC · JPL |
| 531978 | 2013 CR_{200} | — | January 20, 2013 | Kitt Peak | Spacewatch | · | 2.3 km | MPC · JPL |
| 531979 | 2013 CC_{203} | — | March 15, 2008 | Mount Lemmon | Mount Lemmon Survey | THM | 1.8 km | MPC · JPL |
| 531980 | 2013 CG_{205} | — | March 8, 2008 | Mount Lemmon | Mount Lemmon Survey | · | 1.3 km | MPC · JPL |
| 531981 | 2013 CE_{207} | — | February 7, 2013 | Kitt Peak | Spacewatch | · | 600 m | MPC · JPL |
| 531982 | 2013 CT_{209} | — | April 14, 2008 | Mount Lemmon | Mount Lemmon Survey | · | 2.7 km | MPC · JPL |
| 531983 | 2013 CH_{210} | — | February 9, 2008 | Kitt Peak | Spacewatch | · | 2.0 km | MPC · JPL |
| 531984 | 2013 CT_{210} | — | October 24, 2011 | Haleakala | Pan-STARRS 1 | · | 2.3 km | MPC · JPL |
| 531985 | 2013 CH_{217} | — | January 22, 2013 | Mount Lemmon | Mount Lemmon Survey | · | 2.6 km | MPC · JPL |
| 531986 | 2013 CA_{222} | — | January 15, 2013 | Catalina | CSS | · | 690 m | MPC · JPL |
| 531987 | 2013 CB_{224} | — | January 17, 2007 | Kitt Peak | Spacewatch | · | 2.0 km | MPC · JPL |
| 531988 | 2013 CF_{225} | — | September 1, 2010 | Mount Lemmon | Mount Lemmon Survey | · | 2.5 km | MPC · JPL |
| 531989 | 2013 CM_{225} | — | February 5, 2013 | Kitt Peak | Spacewatch | · | 620 m | MPC · JPL |
| 531990 | 2013 CN_{225} | — | March 11, 2008 | Mount Lemmon | Mount Lemmon Survey | · | 1.6 km | MPC · JPL |
| 531991 | 2013 CS_{225} | — | November 24, 2011 | Mount Lemmon | Mount Lemmon Survey | · | 2.3 km | MPC · JPL |
| 531992 | 2013 CB_{227} | — | October 31, 2008 | Kitt Peak | Spacewatch | · | 600 m | MPC · JPL |
| 531993 | 2013 CC_{227} | — | December 27, 2006 | Mount Lemmon | Mount Lemmon Survey | · | 2.9 km | MPC · JPL |
| 531994 | 2013 CP_{227} | — | February 15, 2013 | Haleakala | Pan-STARRS 1 | · | 2.3 km | MPC · JPL |
| 531995 | 2013 CW_{227} | — | February 15, 2013 | Haleakala | Pan-STARRS 1 | · | 2.6 km | MPC · JPL |
| 531996 | 2013 CP_{228} | — | February 8, 2013 | Haleakala | Pan-STARRS 1 | CYB | 3.5 km | MPC · JPL |
| 531997 | 2013 CT_{228} | — | February 15, 2013 | Haleakala | Pan-STARRS 1 | · | 3.2 km | MPC · JPL |
| 531998 | 2013 CV_{228} | — | February 13, 2007 | Mount Lemmon | Mount Lemmon Survey | · | 3.1 km | MPC · JPL |
| 531999 | 2013 CW_{228} | — | February 8, 2013 | Haleakala | Pan-STARRS 1 | · | 710 m | MPC · JPL |
| 532000 | 2013 CD_{229} | — | February 15, 2013 | Haleakala | Pan-STARRS 1 | · | 860 m | MPC · JPL |

back to top
