= Faulkes Telescope South =

Telescope in the Siding Spring Observatory, Australia

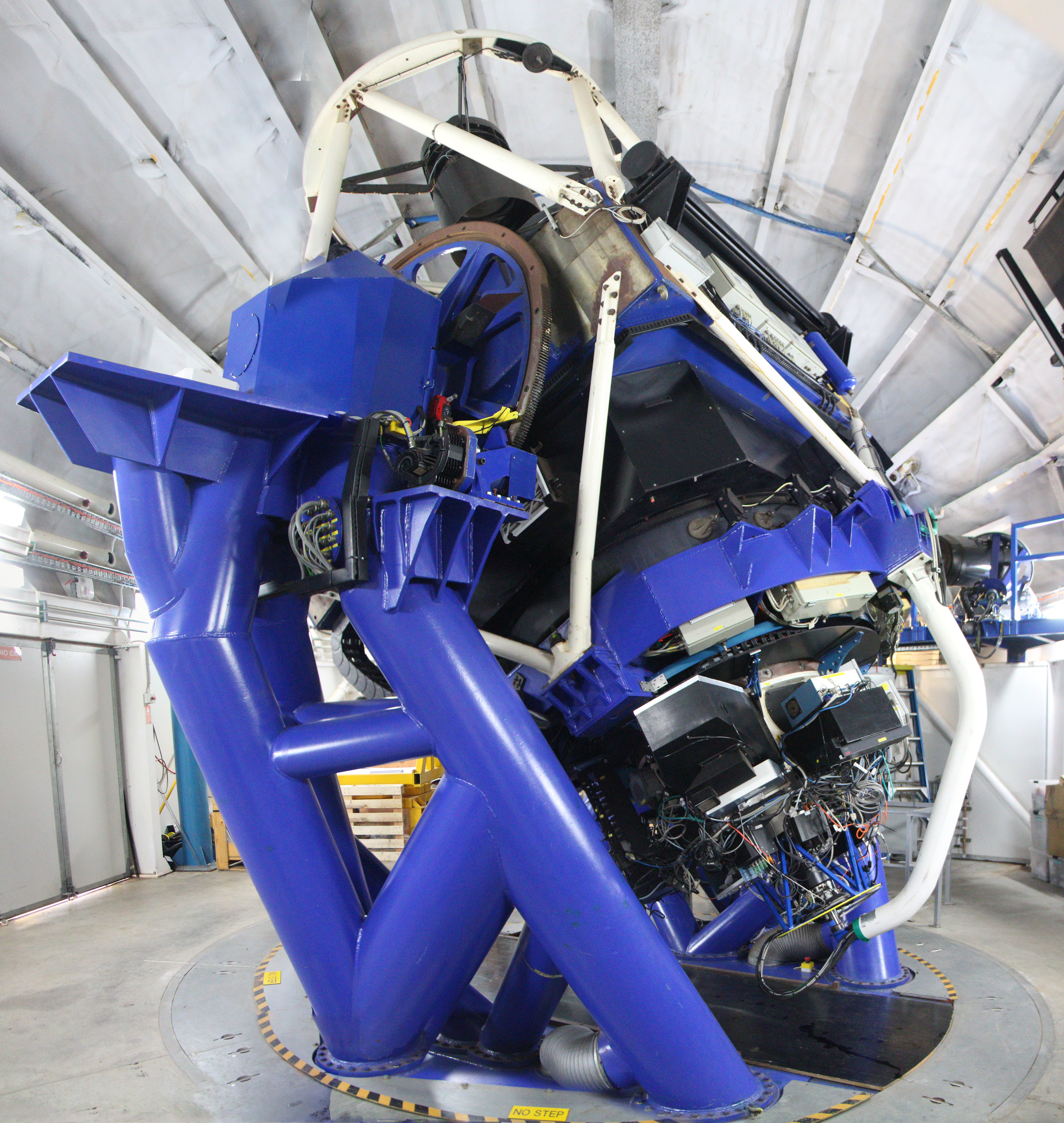
- Faulkes Telescope South inside its closed housing
- Named after: Dill Faulkes
- Part of: Las Cumbres Observatory
- Location(s): Siding Spring Observatory, New South Wales, AUS
- Coordinates: 31°16′22″S 149°04′15″E
- Altitude: 1,165 m (3,822 ft)
- First light: 2006
- Telescope style: Ritchey–Chrétien telescope
- Diameter: 2 m (6 ft 7 in)
- Website: lco.global/observatory/telescopes/faulkes-telescope-south/
- Location of Faulkes Telescope South
- Related media on Commons

The Faulkes Telescope South is a clone of the Liverpool Telescope and is located at Siding Spring Observatory in New South Wales, Australia. It is a 2 m (79 in) Ritchey-Chrétien telescope. It was designed to be operated remotely with the aim of encouraging an interest in science by young people. It is supported by an altazimuth mount.

The telescope is owned and operated by LCOGT. This telescope and its sister telescope Faulkes Telescope North are used by research and education groups across the globe. The Faulkes Telescope Project is one such group which provides observing time (awarded by LCOGT) for educational projects for UK schools. Funds were initially sourced by charitable donations from philanthropist Dr. Martin C. Faulkes.

Faulkes Telescope South saw first light in 2004 with full operations occurring by 2006.

== Discoveries ==
2008 HJ is a small near-Earth asteroid which at the time of its discovery was the most rapidly rotating object in the solar system.

== Observations ==
On 4 May 2007 the first ever observation of one of the satellites of Uranus passing in front of another was made by Marton Hidas and Tim Brown.

In 2013 it was used to image the Near-Earth asteroid 2013 XY8.

== See also ==
- List of largest optical reflecting telescopes
- Liverpool Telescope
- List of telescopes of Australia
