= List of Jupiter trojans (Trojan camp) (500001–600000) =

This is a partial list of Jupiter's L_{5} trojans (60° behind Jupiter) with numbers 500001–600000. If available, an object's mean diameter is taken from the NEOWISE data release, which the Small-Body Database has also adopted. Mean diameters are rounded to two significant figures if smaller than 100 kilometers. Estimates are in italics and calculated from a magnitude-to-diameter conversion, using an assumed albedo of 0.057.

== 500001–600000 ==
This list contains 509 objects sorted in numerical order.

Designation	Discovery			Orbital description					Diam.	Remarks	Refs
Designation	Date	Observer	Site	a (AU)	e	i (°)	q (AU)	Q (AU)	Diam.	Remarks	Refs
(507178) 2010 HO_{22}	18 January 2015	Pan-STARRS 1	Haleakala	5.236	0.032	29.7	5.068	5.403	11 km	–	catalog · MPC · JPL
(507307) 2011 OO_{60}	25 July 2011	Pan-STARRS 1	Haleakala	5.087	0.071	9.7	4.724	5.449	8.1 km	–	catalog · MPC · JPL
(508976) 2004 XS_{157}	14 December 2004	Spacewatch	Kitt Peak	5.165	0.052	10.6	4.898	5.431	11 km	–	catalog · MPC · JPL
(509140) 2006 AW_{77}	7 January 2006	MLS	Mount Lemmon	5.194	0.213	26.6	4.090	6.298	9.2 km	–	catalog · MPC · JPL
(509144) 2006 BF_{102}	23 January 2006	MLS	Mount Lemmon	5.173	0.132	17.4	4.491	5.855	11 km	–	catalog · MPC · JPL
(509409) 2007 DY_{94}	23 February 2007	Spacewatch	Kitt Peak	5.094	0.018	28.2	5.000	5.188	13 km	–	catalog · MPC · JPL
(509634) 2008 FY_{129}	28 March 2008	MLS	Mount Lemmon	5.160	0.144	15.4	4.416	5.904	11 km	–	catalog · MPC · JPL
(509925) 2009 HW_{108}	29 April 2009	MLS	Mount Lemmon	5.257	0.068	31.3	4.899	5.615	12 km	–	catalog · MPC · JPL
(510063) 2010 HU_{21}	23 August 2011	Pan-STARRS 1	Haleakala	5.234	0.089	18.8	4.771	5.698	7.2 km	–	catalog · MPC · JPL
(510078) 2010 JN_{179}	19 November 2003	Spacewatch	Kitt Peak	5.166	0.051	18.4	4.905	5.428	10 km	–	catalog · MPC · JPL
(510289) 2011 OX_{1}	22 July 2011	Pan-STARRS 1	Haleakala	5.192	0.110	12.2	4.622	5.761	8.9 km	–	catalog · MPC · JPL
(510503) 2012 AG_{3}	13 December 2004	Spacewatch	Kitt Peak	5.103	0.067	18.4	4.762	5.445	13 km	–	catalog · MPC · JPL
(510564) 2012 PL_{24}	13 August 2012	Pan-STARRS 1	Haleakala	5.223	0.050	8.8	4.961	5.486	7.8 km	–	catalog · MPC · JPL
(510567) 2012 PN_{44}	26 June 2011	MLS	Mount Lemmon	5.147	0.125	12.8	4.502	5.792	10 km	–	catalog · MPC · JPL
(510568) 2012 QF_{10}	9 March 2007	MLS	Mount Lemmon	5.161	0.055	17.9	4.878	5.445	9.2 km	–	catalog · MPC · JPL
(510573) 2012 QN_{52}	24 August 2012	Spacewatch	Kitt Peak	5.256	0.069	12.5	4.891	5.620	8.0 km	–	catalog · MPC · JPL
(510591) 2012 SA_{32}	21 August 2011	Pan-STARRS 1	Haleakala	5.124	0.130	9.5	4.456	5.792	7.2 km	–	catalog · MPC · JPL
(510608) 2012 TO_{52}	8 October 2012	MLS	Mount Lemmon	5.259	0.005	6.4	5.235	5.283	9.4 km	–	catalog · MPC · JPL
(510619) 2012 TA_{135}	6 October 2012	Pan-STARRS 1	Haleakala	5.339	0.081	10.6	4.906	5.772	8.7 km	–	catalog · MPC · JPL
(510625) 2012 TX_{164}	17 September 2012	Spacewatch	Kitt Peak	5.157	0.117	10.3	4.555	5.759	7.0 km	–	catalog · MPC · JPL
(510632) 2012 TT_{177}	8 October 2012	MLS	Mount Lemmon	5.204	0.058	5.5	4.904	5.503	6.1 km	–	catalog · MPC · JPL
(510736) 2012 VF_{114}	1 November 2014	MLS	Mount Lemmon	5.297	0.016	16.5	5.210	5.384	9.6 km	–	catalog · MPC · JPL
(511045) 2013 RG_{64}	15 August 2013	Pan-STARRS 1	Haleakala	5.210	0.083	7.8	4.778	5.642	7.3 km	–	catalog · MPC · JPL
(511056) 2013 SU_{45}	13 August 2012	Pan-STARRS 1	Haleakala	5.174	0.085	5.3	4.733	5.615	8.5 km	–	catalog · MPC · JPL
(511099) 2013 TV_{159}	2 October 2013	MLS	Mount Lemmon	5.055	0.045	2.0	4.826	5.285	6.5 km	–	catalog · MPC · JPL
(511525) 2014 QY_{442}	29 April 2009	Spacewatch	Kitt Peak	5.209	0.069	33.8	4.852	5.567	7.7 km	–	catalog · MPC · JPL
(511533) 2014 SN_{349}	20 September 2014	Pan-STARRS 1	Haleakala	5.185	0.062	29.5	4.862	5.507	10 km	–	catalog · MPC · JPL
(511534) 2014 SQ_{349}	22 September 2014	Pan-STARRS 1	Haleakala	5.231	0.074	29.7	4.843	5.620	9.7 km	–	catalog · MPC · JPL
(511564) 2014 WR_{215}	21 April 2009	Spacewatch	Kitt Peak	5.223	0.020	20.3	5.119	5.327	9.4 km	–	catalog · MPC · JPL
(511568) 2014 WD_{392}	22 November 2014	Pan-STARRS 1	Haleakala	5.257	0.035	20.0	5.071	5.444	8.9 km	–	catalog · MPC · JPL
(511570) 2014 WP_{463}	31 March 2008	MLS	Mount Lemmon	5.224	0.117	13.3	4.611	5.836	13 km	–	catalog · MPC · JPL
(511576) 2014 WM_{511}	24 November 2003	Spacewatch	Kitt Peak	5.194	0.037	14.3	5.002	5.386	7.7 km	–	catalog · MPC · JPL
(511582) 2014 XA_{40}	6 September 2012	Pan-STARRS 1	Haleakala	5.214	0.076	20.0	4.815	5.613	9.8 km	–	catalog · MPC · JPL
(511688) 2015 BB_{515}	26 June 2011	MLS	Mount Lemmon	5.169	0.065	31.4	4.836	5.503	9.9 km	–	catalog · MPC · JPL
(512246) 2016 AW_{53}	18 August 2011	Pan-STARRS 1	Haleakala	5.136	0.058	28.0	4.835	5.436	12 km	–	catalog · MPC · JPL
(512933) 2017 AD_{13}	24 March 2010	WISE	WISE	5.209	0.033	28.2	5.037	5.380	14 km	–	catalog · MPC · JPL
(512936) 2017 BE_{6}	1 May 2009	MLS	Mount Lemmon	5.098	0.050	29.8	4.840	5.355	11 km	–	catalog · MPC · JPL
(512938) 2017 BT_{12}	9 January 2006	Spacewatch	Kitt Peak	5.173	0.084	20.5	4.736	5.610	11 km	–	catalog · MPC · JPL
(512939) 2017 BM_{16}	1 July 2011	MLS	Mount Lemmon	5.199	0.031	20.2	5.038	5.360	12 km	–	catalog · MPC · JPL
(512944) 2017 BE_{93}	22 December 2003	Spacewatch	Kitt Peak	5.289	0.074	30.4	4.900	5.678	11 km	–	catalog · MPC · JPL
(512945) 2017 BF_{93}	27 April 2010	WISE	WISE	5.259	0.117	31.1	4.644	5.874	12 km	–	catalog · MPC · JPL
(512946) 2017 CK	14 May 2008	Spacewatch	Kitt Peak	5.245	0.032	28.3	5.078	5.411	10 km	–	catalog · MPC · JPL
(512947) 2017 CZ	4 September 2014	Pan-STARRS 1	Haleakala	5.163	0.043	30.5	4.944	5.383	9.3 km	–	catalog · MPC · JPL
(512950) 2017 EL_{5}	28 December 2003	Spacewatch	Kitt Peak	5.279	0.049	29.2	5.020	5.539	13 km	–	catalog · MPC · JPL
(513164) 2004 BY_{163}	16 January 2004	Spacewatch	Kitt Peak	5.279	0.041	6.9	5.064	5.495	9.3 km	–	catalog · MPC · JPL
(513251) 2006 ER_{26}	30 January 2006	Spacewatch	Kitt Peak	5.348	0.060	3.0	5.024	5.671	7.1 km	–	catalog · MPC · JPL
(513253) 2006 EK_{71}	25 January 2006	Spacewatch	Kitt Peak	5.210	0.090	25.7	4.739	5.682	11 km	–	catalog · MPC · JPL
(513387) 2008 GY_{133}	4 April 2008	Spacewatch	Kitt Peak	5.233	0.128	14.5	4.565	5.901	8.2 km	–	catalog · MPC · JPL
(513394) 2008 HE_{69}	16 April 2008	MLS	Mount Lemmon	5.228	0.128	17.5	4.559	5.898	7.5 km	–	catalog · MPC · JPL
(513395) 2008 HF_{71}	24 September 2014	MLS	Mount Lemmon	5.223	0.046	19.9	4.985	5.461	7.4 km	–	catalog · MPC · JPL
(513398) 2008 KM_{10}	11 May 2008	MLS	Mount Lemmon	5.307	0.066	21.3	4.956	5.657	7.9 km	–	catalog · MPC · JPL
(513401) 2008 KH_{23}	15 April 2008	MLS	Mount Lemmon	5.261	0.052	29.4	4.988	5.535	9.5 km	–	catalog · MPC · JPL
(513403) 2008 KO_{43}	16 April 2008	MLS	Mount Lemmon	5.276	0.090	19.0	4.800	5.751	11 km	–	catalog · MPC · JPL
(513500) 2009 KE_{37}	19 April 2009	Spacewatch	Kitt Peak	5.148	0.124	22.4	4.507	5.788	9.9 km	–	catalog · MPC · JPL
(513561) 2010 RL_{188}	11 June 2011	MLS	Mount Lemmon	5.284	0.019	6.2	5.184	5.384	9.5 km	–	catalog · MPC · JPL
(513633) 2011 OU_{58}	27 July 2011	Pan-STARRS 1	Haleakala	5.214	0.055	35.4	4.930	5.498	11 km	–	catalog · MPC · JPL
(513634) 2011 OP_{60}	27 July 2011	Pan-STARRS 1	Haleakala	5.180	0.042	14.4	4.960	5.400	8.9 km	–	catalog · MPC · JPL
(513640) 2011 QR_{73}	20 August 2011	Pan-STARRS 1	Haleakala	5.228	0.081	18.2	4.803	5.652	8.8 km	–	catalog · MPC · JPL
(513734) 2012 TS_{324}	15 October 2012	Pan-STARRS 1	Haleakala	5.225	0.022	12.9	5.111	5.339	8.9 km	–	catalog · MPC · JPL
(513891) 2013 TY_{60}	24 August 2012	Spacewatch	Kitt Peak	5.234	0.068	10.3	4.875	5.592	8.5 km	–	catalog · MPC · JPL
(514062) 2014 OT_{394}	28 July 2014	Pan-STARRS 1	Haleakala	5.214	0.051	10.2	4.950	5.477	7.8 km	–	catalog · MPC · JPL
(514078) 2014 SP_{349}	16 May 2009	MLS	Mount Lemmon	5.215	0.042	30.8	4.997	5.432	8.7 km	–	catalog · MPC · JPL
(514079) 2014 SD_{351}	11 March 2005	MLS	Mount Lemmon	5.157	0.025	18.0	5.026	5.289	9.5 km	–	catalog · MPC · JPL
(514082) 2014 UG_{98}	13 September 2012	MLS	Mount Lemmon	5.218	0.088	7.7	4.757	5.679	7.8 km	–	catalog · MPC · JPL
(514083) 2014 UL_{160}	25 July 2011	Pan-STARRS 1	Haleakala	5.186	0.012	7.4	5.126	5.246	8.6 km	–	catalog · MPC · JPL
(514084) 2014 UR_{225}	11 March 2008	MLS	Mount Lemmon	5.139	0.044	8.6	4.913	5.365	7.7 km	–	catalog · MPC · JPL
(514089) 2014 WS_{137}	4 May 2009	MLS	Mount Lemmon	5.165	0.149	15.3	4.395	5.934	8.9 km	–	catalog · MPC · JPL
(514095) 2014 WF_{511}	7 April 2008	MLS	Mount Lemmon	5.153	0.059	39.0	4.849	5.457	11 km	–	catalog · MPC · JPL
(514097) 2014 XW_{20}	26 June 2011	MLS	Mount Lemmon	5.217	0.056	5.1	4.924	5.510	8.3 km	–	catalog · MPC · JPL
(514098) 2014 XE_{33}	10 April 2008	Spacewatch	Kitt Peak	5.234	0.087	11.1	4.778	5.690	10 km	–	catalog · MPC · JPL
(514099) 2014 XL_{40}	15 April 2008	MLS	Mount Lemmon	5.227	0.121	2.5	4.595	5.858	7.5 km	–	catalog · MPC · JPL
(514308) 2015 XG_{386}	28 July 2012	Pan-STARRS 1	Haleakala	5.179	0.101	26.7	4.655	5.703	9.3 km	–	catalog · MPC · JPL
(514309) 2015 XL_{386}	15 January 2005	Spacewatch	Kitt Peak	5.284	0.017	8.3	5.195	5.373	8.5 km	–	catalog · MPC · JPL
(514310) 2015 YA_{2}	29 October 2014	Spacewatch	Kitt Peak	5.192	0.111	9.7	4.615	5.769	7.7 km	–	catalog · MPC · JPL
(514535) 2017 BX_{27}	14 February 2005	Spacewatch	Kitt Peak	5.226	0.078	29.2	4.819	5.633	11 km	–	catalog · MPC · JPL
(514536) 2017 BE_{31}	31 March 2008	Spacewatch	Kitt Peak	5.145	0.037	20.9	4.957	5.333	9.5 km	–	catalog · MPC · JPL
(514540) 2017 BJ_{91}	19 April 2010	WISE	WISE	5.184	0.059	37.8	4.878	5.491	11 km	–	catalog · MPC · JPL
(514541) 2017 BZ_{96}	23 April 2007	MLS	Mount Lemmon	5.236	0.156	10.8	4.419	6.053	7.1 km	–	catalog · MPC · JPL
(514542) 2017 CV	21 November 2014	Pan-STARRS 1	Haleakala	5.223	0.075	30.9	4.833	5.613	8.7 km	–	catalog · MPC · JPL
(514543) 2017 DL_{1}	21 April 2010	WISE	WISE	5.143	0.070	29.1	4.782	5.504	12 km	–	catalog · MPC · JPL
(514544) 2017 DF_{110}	28 July 2011	Pan-STARRS 1	Haleakala	5.254	0.025	8.4	5.124	5.384	8.0 km	–	catalog · MPC · JPL
(514587) 2001 WK_{104}	4 April 2008	Spacewatch	Kitt Peak	5.249	0.019	8.8	5.149	5.350	7.6 km	–	catalog · MPC · JPL
(514616) 2004 BX_{163}	16 January 2004	Spacewatch	Kitt Peak	5.149	0.088	26.7	4.698	5.600	11 km	–	catalog · MPC · JPL
(514692) 2006 BV_{81}	23 January 2006	Spacewatch	Kitt Peak	5.243	0.050	29.7	4.982	5.503	9.5 km	–	catalog · MPC · JPL
(514696) 2006 DA_{134}	28 January 2006	Spacewatch	Kitt Peak	5.226	0.091	10.0	4.750	5.702	8.4 km	–	catalog · MPC · JPL
(514762) 2007 EH_{99}	11 March 2007	Spacewatch	Kitt Peak	5.130	0.055	28.4	4.849	5.410	12 km	–	catalog · MPC · JPL
(514771) 2007 ER_{225}	9 March 2007	Spacewatch	Kitt Peak	5.164	0.065	29.4	4.828	5.501	9.2 km	–	catalog · MPC · JPL
(514772) 2007 ET_{225}	28 January 2007	MLS	Mount Lemmon	5.209	0.127	15.3	4.549	5.869	7.3 km	–	catalog · MPC · JPL
(514778) 2007 GL_{5}	11 March 2007	Spacewatch	Kitt Peak	5.200	0.139	25.7	4.476	5.924	9.0 km	–	catalog · MPC · JPL
(514869) 2008 GV_{133}	13 April 2008	MLS	Mount Lemmon	5.273	0.108	12.8	4.705	5.842	8.6 km	–	catalog · MPC · JPL
(514871) 2008 GT_{141}	14 April 2008	MLS	Mount Lemmon	5.290	0.054	14.2	5.003	5.578	7.9 km	–	catalog · MPC · JPL
(514875) 2008 HB_{33}	29 April 2008	MLS	Mount Lemmon	5.173	0.120	6.1	4.553	5.792	7.5 km	–	catalog · MPC · JPL
(514882) 2008 KQ_{16}	3 May 2008	Spacewatch	Kitt Peak	5.212	0.080	16.1	4.794	5.630	7.8 km	–	catalog · MPC · JPL
(514997) 2009 KP_{14}	17 April 2009	MLS	Mount Lemmon	5.206	0.128	18.2	4.539	5.873	7.3 km	–	catalog · MPC · JPL
(515155) 2011 MK_{11}	27 June 2011	Spacewatch	Kitt Peak	5.097	0.144	10.0	4.362	5.833	8.6 km	–	catalog · MPC · JPL
(515442) 2013 TW_{90}	1 September 2013	MLS	Mount Lemmon	5.173	0.027	12.8	5.032	5.313	7.9 km	–	catalog · MPC · JPL
(515445) 2013 TW_{159}	9 October 2013	MLS	Mount Lemmon	5.202	0.044	12.4	4.976	5.429	7.8 km	–	catalog · MPC · JPL
(515447) 2013 UY_{15}	26 October 2013	Spacewatch	Kitt Peak	5.240	0.041	18.3	5.025	5.455	9.1 km	–	catalog · MPC · JPL
(515448) 2013 VK_{24}	24 August 2011	Pan-STARRS 1	Haleakala	5.334	0.093	13.2	4.837	5.831	11 km	–	catalog · MPC · JPL
(515449) 2013 VM_{24}	4 June 2011	MLS	Mount Lemmon	5.280	0.089	20.5	4.812	5.748	9.6 km	–	catalog · MPC · JPL
(515450) 2013 WB_{36}	27 November 2013	Pan-STARRS 1	Haleakala	5.166	0.033	21.7	4.993	5.338	9.1 km	–	catalog · MPC · JPL
(515455) 2013 WH_{110}	14 July 2013	Pan-STARRS 1	Haleakala	5.209	0.110	6.4	4.636	5.781	7.5 km	–	catalog · MPC · JPL
(515717) 2014 UX_{182}	14 September 2013	Pan-STARRS 1	Haleakala	5.163	0.076	8.5	4.769	5.556	7.7 km	–	catalog · MPC · JPL
(515721) 2014 WM_{220}	1 October 2013	MLS	Mount Lemmon	5.145	0.097	8.8	4.645	5.645	7.3 km	–	catalog · MPC · JPL
(515726) 2014 WD_{387}	4 September 2014	Pan-STARRS 1	Haleakala	5.264	0.006	29.2	5.230	5.298	8.7 km	–	catalog · MPC · JPL
(515727) 2014 WF_{403}	14 April 2008	Spacewatch	Kitt Peak	5.237	0.052	7.0	4.963	5.511	8.2 km	–	catalog · MPC · JPL
(515728) 2014 WS_{490}	10 March 2008	MLS	Mount Lemmon	5.239	0.054	31.1	4.953	5.524	10 km	–	catalog · MPC · JPL
(515730) 2014 WT_{510}	15 May 2008	MLS	Mount Lemmon	5.247	0.098	18.7	4.736	5.759	7.3 km	–	catalog · MPC · JPL
(515738) 2015 AW_{95}	15 March 2007	MLS	Mount Lemmon	5.219	0.049	20.4	4.966	5.473	8.7 km	–	catalog · MPC · JPL
(516152) 2015 XE_{386}	25 October 2014	Pan-STARRS 1	Haleakala	5.210	0.086	14.8	4.762	5.658	10 km	–	catalog · MPC · JPL
(516343) 2017 BH_{86}	25 June 2011	MLS	Mount Lemmon	5.160	0.033	29.6	4.991	5.330	9.7 km	–	catalog · MPC · JPL
(516347) 2017 BB_{92}	2 May 2010	WISE	WISE	5.329	0.035	28.6	5.140	5.517	10 km	–	catalog · MPC · JPL
(516354) 2017 BJ_{112}	18 October 2014	MLS	Mount Lemmon	5.237	0.068	8.8	4.881	5.593	8.2 km	–	catalog · MPC · JPL
(516371) 2017 DG_{116}	22 April 2010	WISE	WISE	5.161	0.033	17.1	4.991	5.330	11 km	–	catalog · MPC · JPL
(516375) 2017 FR_{100}	24 February 2006	Spacewatch	Kitt Peak	5.221	0.112	13.9	4.636	5.806	9.5 km	–	catalog · MPC · JPL
(516386) 2018 DX	14 December 2004	Spacewatch	Kitt Peak	5.121	0.054	21.1	4.846	5.396	12 km	–	catalog · MPC · JPL
(516419) 2002 VU_{149}	22 November 2014	MLS	Mount Lemmon	5.226	0.107	19.3	4.669	5.782	7.7 km	–	catalog · MPC · JPL
(516517) 2006 ES_{2}	1 February 2006	Spacewatch	Kitt Peak	5.240	0.091	18.5	4.763	5.717	12 km	–	catalog · MPC · JPL
(516604) 2007 JK_{46}	10 May 2007	Spacewatch	Kitt Peak	5.250	0.012	22.9	5.185	5.315	9.0 km	–	catalog · MPC · JPL
(517574) 2014 UW_{85}	25 February 2006	MLS	Mount Lemmon	5.207	0.074	1.6	4.823	5.592	7.0 km	–	catalog · MPC · JPL
(517592) 2014 WT_{118}	7 April 2008	Spacewatch	Kitt Peak	5.261	0.075	28.4	4.869	5.654	9.8 km	–	catalog · MPC · JPL
(517595) 2014 WF_{232}	3 October 2013	Pan-STARRS 1	Haleakala	5.174	0.069	8.9	4.816	5.533	7.8 km	–	catalog · MPC · JPL
(517619) 2014 XP_{12}	4 November 2014	MLS	Mount Lemmon	5.161	0.080	16.4	4.748	5.573	7.4 km	–	catalog · MPC · JPL
(518333) 2017 BT_{121}	30 August 2011	Pan-STARRS 1	Haleakala	5.191	0.005	24.9	5.164	5.218	13 km	–	catalog · MPC · JPL
(518360) 2017 DZ_{65}	7 December 2015	Pan-STARRS 1	Haleakala	5.179	0.007	30.7	5.141	5.217	7.2 km	–	catalog · MPC · JPL
(523904) 1997 JF_{7}	5 May 1997	Spacewatch	Kitt Peak	5.145	0.106	27.2	4.601	5.688	10 km	–	catalog · MPC · JPL
(524291) 2001 TS_{263}	3 October 2013	Pan-STARRS 1	Haleakala	5.190	0.051	9.1	4.926	5.454	6.8 km	–	catalog · MPC · JPL
(526316) 2006 BH_{169}	26 January 2006	Spacewatch	Kitt Peak	5.270	0.041	23.5	5.055	5.486	8.3 km	–	catalog · MPC · JPL
(526374) 2006 DM_{213}	26 January 2006	MLS	Mount Lemmon	5.196	0.084	9.8	4.758	5.635	7.3 km	–	catalog · MPC · JPL
(526853) 2007 DK_{119}	21 February 2007	MLS	Mount Lemmon	5.134	0.082	26.6	4.712	5.557	9.9 km	–	catalog · MPC · JPL
(526872) 2007 EH_{222}	14 March 2007	Spacewatch	Kitt Peak	5.183	0.081	31.4	4.761	5.606	6.9 km	–	catalog · MPC · JPL
(526900) 2007 HM_{2}	26 February 2007	MLS	Mount Lemmon	5.338	0.016	27.7	5.250	5.426	8.2 km	–	catalog · MPC · JPL
(528014) 2008 EG_{163}	11 March 2008	Spacewatch	Kitt Peak	5.087	0.033	12.0	4.919	5.255	8.1 km	–	catalog · MPC · JPL
(528086) 2008 FJ_{125}	31 March 2008	Spacewatch	Kitt Peak	5.191	0.103	33.7	4.658	5.724	7.7 km	–	catalog · MPC · JPL
(528088) 2008 FF_{133}	31 March 2008	Spacewatch	Kitt Peak	5.180	0.100	16.0	4.662	5.698	7.1 km	–	catalog · MPC · JPL
(528110) 2008 GQ_{47}	4 April 2008	Spacewatch	Kitt Peak	5.218	0.072	23.3	4.840	5.596	8.7 km	–	catalog · MPC · JPL
(528114) 2008 GD_{50}	1 April 2008	Spacewatch	Kitt Peak	5.126	0.046	11.7	4.892	5.360	7.8 km	–	catalog · MPC · JPL
(528148) 2008 GP_{141}	1 April 2008	Spacewatch	Kitt Peak	5.151	0.081	8.9	4.734	5.567	6.7 km	–	catalog · MPC · JPL
(528163) 2008 HU_{11}	24 April 2008	Spacewatch	Kitt Peak	5.275	0.087	18.5	4.818	5.733	11 km	–	catalog · MPC · JPL
(528210) 2008 KF_{10}	7 April 2008	Spacewatch	Kitt Peak	5.314	0.034	15.2	5.134	5.493	8.0 km	–	catalog · MPC · JPL
(528215) 2008 KY_{36}	29 May 2008	Spacewatch	Kitt Peak	5.311	0.062	26.1	4.980	5.641	8.0 km	–	catalog · MPC · JPL
(528220) 2008 KN_{43}	6 April 2008	Spacewatch	Kitt Peak	5.184	0.097	12.0	4.680	5.688	8.3 km	–	catalog · MPC · JPL
(530539) 2011 OF_{39}	28 July 2011	Pan-STARRS 1	Haleakala	5.189	0.074	10.1	4.806	5.573	5.9 km	–	catalog · MPC · JPL
(530553) 2011 QQ_{4}	19 August 2011	Pan-STARRS 1	Haleakala	5.266	0.065	9.2	4.923	5.609	6.9 km	–	catalog · MPC · JPL
(531327) 2012 QH_{22}	24 August 2012	Spacewatch	Kitt Peak	5.151	0.097	5.9	4.650	5.651	6.5 km	–	catalog · MPC · JPL
(531332) 2012 QL_{52}	3 October 2013	Pan-STARRS 1	Haleakala	5.191	0.076	14.6	4.796	5.585	5.8 km	–	catalog · MPC · JPL
(531368) 2012 RX_{43}	13 September 2012	MLS	Mount Lemmon	5.192	0.128	1.3	4.527	5.856	7.4 km	–	catalog · MPC · JPL
(531372) 2012 SD_{1}	11 November 2001	Spacewatch	Kitt Peak	5.197	0.084	23.8	4.759	5.636	9.3 km	–	catalog · MPC · JPL
(531469) 2012 TR_{74}	30 April 2010	WISE	WISE	5.125	0.099	30.5	4.616	5.635	8.0 km	–	catalog · MPC · JPL
(531505) 2012 TV_{152}	8 October 2012	Pan-STARRS 1	Haleakala	5.188	0.056	12.6	4.896	5.481	7.8 km	–	catalog · MPC · JPL
(531538) 2012 TL_{218}	22 September 2012	Spacewatch	Kitt Peak	5.244	0.040	30.0	5.036	5.452	8.7 km	–	catalog · MPC · JPL
(531555) 2012 TX_{267}	8 October 2012	MLS	Mount Lemmon	5.223	0.051	9.7	4.955	5.491	7.0 km	–	catalog · MPC · JPL
(531566) 2012 TD_{288}	3 May 2008	Spacewatch	Kitt Peak	5.205	0.050	25.4	4.944	5.467	7.8 km	–	catalog · MPC · JPL
(531582) 2012 TG_{324}	15 May 2009	Spacewatch	Kitt Peak	5.228	0.075	30.7	4.837	5.619	8.3 km	–	catalog · MPC · JPL
(531721) 2012 VU_{7}	20 September 2011	MLS	Mount Lemmon	5.282	0.055	8.2	4.991	5.574	7.6 km	–	catalog · MPC · JPL
(532361) 2013 RR_{53}	18 September 2012	MLS	Mount Lemmon	5.262	0.063	8.8	4.932	5.593	8.4 km	–	catalog · MPC · JPL
(532484) 2013 SB_{102}	26 September 2013	MLS	Mount Lemmon	5.162	0.055	3.1	4.879	5.444	6.6 km	–	catalog · MPC · JPL
(532537) 2013 TD_{83}	2 August 2011	Pan-STARRS 1	Haleakala	5.153	0.044	10.2	4.926	5.380	7.7 km	–	catalog · MPC · JPL
(532615) 2013 TJ_{171}	27 July 2011	Pan-STARRS 1	Haleakala	5.211	0.050	8.7	4.949	5.473	8.3 km	–	catalog · MPC · JPL
(532634) 2013 UX_{15}	24 October 2013	MLS	Mount Lemmon	5.194	0.089	2.5	4.730	5.657	5.8 km	–	catalog · MPC · JPL
(532745) 2013 WP_{28}	30 August 2011	Pan-STARRS 1	Haleakala	5.218	0.139	5.7	4.491	5.944	7.1 km	–	catalog · MPC · JPL
(534373) 2014 TE_{49}	5 October 2014	Pan-STARRS 1	Haleakala	5.143	0.061	26.9	4.828	5.459	9.9 km	–	catalog · MPC · JPL
(534792) 2014 WP_{102}	2 October 2014	Pan-STARRS 1	Haleakala	5.241	0.196	1.7	4.212	6.269	6.8 km	–	catalog · MPC · JPL
(534977) 2014 WM_{460}	4 November 2014	MLS	Mount Lemmon	5.258	0.059	21.3	4.945	5.571	10 km	–	catalog · MPC · JPL
(535033) 2014 WN_{511}	12 April 2010	WISE	WISE	5.195	0.085	25.8	4.752	5.639	11 km	–	catalog · MPC · JPL
(535147) 2014 XA_{5}	14 August 2012	Pan-STARRS 1	Haleakala	5.223	0.111	7.2	4.642	5.803	7.2 km	–	catalog · MPC · JPL
(535166) 2014 XY_{39}	26 October 2014	MLS	Mount Lemmon	5.225	0.101	15.8	4.697	5.754	9.5 km	–	catalog · MPC · JPL
(535308) 2015 AC_{2}	14 May 2008	MLS	Mount Lemmon	5.268	0.059	27.7	4.956	5.579	9.9 km	–	catalog · MPC · JPL
(535434) 2015 AM_{246}	13 October 2001	Spacewatch	Kitt Peak	5.269	0.108	20.9	4.703	5.836	8.9 km	–	catalog · MPC · JPL
(539796) 2017 BB_{56}	25 July 2011	Pan-STARRS 1	Haleakala	5.162	0.034	14.0	4.987	5.336	12 km	–	catalog · MPC · JPL
(539803) 2017 CE_{3}	24 August 2011	Pan-STARRS 1	Haleakala	5.285	0.044	28.8	5.054	5.516	10 km	–	catalog · MPC · JPL
(539815) 2017 DY_{6}	23 March 2010	WISE	WISE	5.193	0.148	24.6	4.426	5.960	10 km	–	catalog · MPC · JPL
(539828) 2017 DY_{38}	31 January 2006	Spacewatch	Kitt Peak	5.186	0.105	8.5	4.640	5.732	7.7 km	–	catalog · MPC · JPL
(539829) 2017 DZ_{38}	26 July 2011	Pan-STARRS 1	Haleakala	5.258	0.097	6.4	4.750	5.765	8.6 km	–	catalog · MPC · JPL
(539830) 2017 DS_{44}	1 March 2005	Spacewatch	Kitt Peak	5.159	0.038	20.5	4.963	5.354	9.9 km	–	catalog · MPC · JPL
(545457) 2011 KG_{24}	15 April 2008	MLS	Mount Lemmon	5.196	0.169	20.3	4.316	6.076	7.9 km	–	catalog · MPC · JPL
(545479) 2011 LS_{20}	13 June 2011	MLS	Mount Lemmon	5.271	0.098	13.0	4.752	5.790	9.6 km	–	catalog · MPC · JPL
(545489) 2011 MB_{8}	24 June 2011	MLS	Mount Lemmon	5.128	0.094	15.4	4.647	5.608	9.3 km	–	catalog · MPC · JPL
(545494) 2011 NR_{3}	26 June 2011	MLS	Mount Lemmon	5.152	0.024	12.2	5.027	5.277	11 km	–	catalog · MPC · JPL
(545501) 2011 OO_{18}	12 June 2009	Spacewatch	Kitt Peak	5.219	0.071	16.6	4.847	5.591	12 km	–	catalog · MPC · JPL
(545503) 2011 OL_{26}	28 January 2007	MLS	Mount Lemmon	5.064	0.083	4.1	4.646	5.482	8.3 km	–	catalog · MPC · JPL
(545505) 2011 OC_{28}	26 July 2011	Pan-STARRS 1	Haleakala	5.219	0.014	24.7	5.148	5.290	8.2 km	–	catalog · MPC · JPL
(545507) 2011 OR_{39}	31 July 2011	Pan-STARRS 1	Haleakala	5.223	0.089	9.1	4.757	5.688	8.4 km	–	catalog · MPC · JPL
(545508) 2011 OH_{41}	27 July 2011	Pan-STARRS 1	Haleakala	5.198	0.111	21.7	4.620	5.775	9.2 km	–	catalog · MPC · JPL
(545517) 2011 ON_{60}	24 July 2011	Faulkes Telescope North	Haleakala	5.170	0.078	9.0	4.766	5.573	6.4 km	–	catalog · MPC · JPL
(545520) 2011 OA_{62}	15 December 2014	MLS	Mount Lemmon	5.194	0.094	11.7	4.707	5.681	8.2 km	–	catalog · MPC · JPL
(545522) 2011 ON_{63}	28 July 2011	Pan-STARRS 1	Haleakala	5.146	0.080	30.6	4.736	5.556	6.4 km	–	catalog · MPC · JPL
(545526) 2011 OP_{66}	25 July 2011	Pan-STARRS 1	Haleakala	5.185	0.041	17.1	4.971	5.399	8.9 km	–	catalog · MPC · JPL
(545527) 2011 OB_{68}	27 July 2011	Pan-STARRS 1	Haleakala	5.149	0.027	16.8	5.008	5.291	6.1 km	–	catalog · MPC · JPL
(545528) 2011 OG_{69}	27 July 2011	Pan-STARRS 1	Haleakala	5.141	0.096	24.1	4.647	5.634	7.3 km	–	catalog · MPC · JPL
(545529) 2011 OP_{69}	27 July 2011	Pan-STARRS 1	Haleakala	5.210	0.038	26.0	5.010	5.409	6.3 km	–	catalog · MPC · JPL
(545533) 2011 PQ_{10}	31 March 2008	MLS	Mount Lemmon	5.166	0.028	13.9	5.020	5.311	8.0 km	–	catalog · MPC · JPL
(545535) 2011 PC_{14}	4 April 2008	Spacewatch	Kitt Peak	5.106	0.065	26.6	4.772	5.441	11 km	–	catalog · MPC · JPL
(545538) 2011 PX_{15}	27 October 2014	Pan-STARRS 1	Haleakala	5.241	0.038	28.8	5.044	5.439	8.3 km	–	catalog · MPC · JPL
(545539) 2011 PY_{15}	9 October 2013	MLS	Mount Lemmon	5.194	0.098	23.0	4.687	5.700	7.5 km	–	catalog · MPC · JPL
(545544) 2011 PD_{20}	14 September 2013	MLS	Mount Lemmon	5.176	0.025	17.6	5.045	5.306	6.7 km	–	catalog · MPC · JPL
(545551) 2011 QR_{11}	21 August 2011	Pan-STARRS 1	Haleakala	5.198	0.199	9.0	4.164	6.232	8.0 km	–	catalog · MPC · JPL
(545552) 2011 QU_{11}	27 April 2009	MLS	Mount Lemmon	5.165	0.102	14.1	4.637	5.693	11 km	–	catalog · MPC · JPL
(545562) 2011 QD_{41}	25 February 2007	Spacewatch	Kitt Peak	5.236	0.136	10.4	4.521	5.950	6.7 km	–	catalog · MPC · JPL
545564 Sabonis	23 August 2011	I. Eglītis	Baldone	5.277	0.050	5.0	5.014	5.540	10 km	–	catalog · MPC · JPL
(545578) 2011 QJ_{96}	6 April 2008	Spacewatch	Kitt Peak	5.231	0.133	13.8	4.535	5.928	8.7 km	–	catalog · MPC · JPL
(545579) 2011 QM_{96}	29 March 2008	Spacewatch	Kitt Peak	5.217	0.179	7.0	4.283	6.151	7.1 km	–	catalog · MPC · JPL
(545580) 2011 QT_{97}	8 October 2012	Pan-STARRS 1	Haleakala	5.180	0.142	14.8	4.444	5.916	7.9 km	–	catalog · MPC · JPL
(545581) 2011 QM_{99}	29 November 2014	Pan-STARRS 1	Haleakala	5.256	0.015	25.8	5.180	5.333	8.5 km	–	catalog · MPC · JPL
(545587) 2011 QU_{107}	28 October 2013	MLS	Mount Lemmon	5.267	0.043	5.6	5.043	5.491	6.6 km	–	catalog · MPC · JPL
(545588) 2011 QN_{109}	24 August 2011	Pan-STARRS 1	Haleakala	5.184	0.103	38.3	4.650	5.717	7.2 km	–	catalog · MPC · JPL
(545598) 2011 RS_{22}	2 September 2011	Pan-STARRS 1	Haleakala	5.278	0.069	5.7	4.914	5.642	7.0 km	–	catalog · MPC · JPL
(545606) 2011 SL_{22}	6 May 2008	MLS	Mount Lemmon	5.282	0.041	11.1	5.066	5.499	8.9 km	–	catalog · MPC · JPL
(545609) 2011 SA_{26}	20 September 2011	MLS	Mount Lemmon	5.359	0.080	6.9	4.929	5.788	6.9 km	–	catalog · MPC · JPL
(545634) 2011 SF_{69}	14 March 2007	Spacewatch	Kitt Peak	5.267	0.092	2.3	4.782	5.752	7.0 km	–	catalog · MPC · JPL
(545742) 2011 SA_{295}	30 April 2008	MLS	Mount Lemmon	5.245	0.048	26.5	4.995	5.495	9.1 km	–	catalog · MPC · JPL
(545972) 2011 UC_{425}	3 January 2017	Pan-STARRS 1	Haleakala	5.275	0.032	27.6	5.106	5.443	7.9 km	–	catalog · MPC · JPL
(549662) 2011 QP_{65}	25 August 2000	R. Millis; L. H. Wasserman	Cerro Tololo	5.167	0.105	38.6	4.623	5.711	12 km	–	catalog · MPC · JPL
(550600) 2012 QJ_{42}	16 August 2012	Pan-STARRS 1	Haleakala	5.193	0.026	8.2	5.060	5.326	6.6 km	–	catalog · MPC · JPL
(550816) 2012 TJ_{210}	31 August 2011	Pan-STARRS 1	Haleakala	5.173	0.126	10.6	4.522	5.824	7.3 km	–	catalog · MPC · JPL
(551867) 2013 NK_{49}	13 July 2013	Pan-STARRS 1	Haleakala	5.206	0.053	25.5	4.929	5.483	9.9 km	–	catalog · MPC · JPL
(551898) 2013 PT_{39}	9 August 2013	Spacewatch	Kitt Peak	5.166	0.068	1.9	4.815	5.516	7.7 km	–	catalog · MPC · JPL
(552046) 2013 RJ_{129}	6 September 2013	MLS	Mount Lemmon	5.100	0.052	1.7	4.833	5.368	8.0 km	–	catalog · MPC · JPL
(552117) 2013 TU_{41}	18 March 2007	Spacewatch	Kitt Peak	5.274	0.095	11.6	4.771	5.777	10 km	–	catalog · MPC · JPL
(552122) 2013 TX_{46}	26 March 2009	Spacewatch	Kitt Peak	5.184	0.167	9.9	4.321	6.047	9.0 km	–	catalog · MPC · JPL
(552127) 2013 TU_{55}	4 October 2013	MLS	Mount Lemmon	5.161	0.049	25.5	4.907	5.415	8.5 km	–	catalog · MPC · JPL
(552177) 2013 TL_{143}	31 March 2008	MLS	Mount Lemmon	5.104	0.082	10.6	4.685	5.523	11 km	–	catalog · MPC · JPL
(552226) 2013 UB_{34}	28 October 2013	MLS	Mount Lemmon	5.200	0.054	28.1	4.921	5.480	7.7 km	–	catalog · MPC · JPL
(552354) 2013 WR_{123}	4 February 2017	Pan-STARRS 1	Haleakala	5.243	0.064	7.6	4.906	5.580	6.7 km	–	catalog · MPC · JPL
(553392) 2011 MS_{14}	28 June 2011	W. Bickel	Bergisch Gladbach	5.188	0.159	12.4	4.365	6.011	7.8 km	–	catalog · MPC · JPL
(553393) 2011 NR_{4}	13 August 2012	Pan-STARRS 1	Haleakala	5.105	0.070	11.4	4.746	5.465	6.8 km	–	catalog · MPC · JPL
(553402) 2011 OO_{26}	27 July 2011	Pan-STARRS 1	Haleakala	5.128	0.030	12.4	4.976	5.279	7.8 km	–	catalog · MPC · JPL
(553408) 2011 OH_{40}	26 July 2011	Pan-STARRS 1	Haleakala	5.209	0.082	7.5	4.781	5.637	7.2 km	–	catalog · MPC · JPL
(553421) 2011 OJ_{63}	8 October 2015	Pan-STARRS 1	Haleakala	5.262	0.024	27.9	5.134	5.391	6.8 km	–	catalog · MPC · JPL
(553424) 2011 OZ_{69}	28 July 2011	Pan-STARRS 1	Haleakala	5.236	0.132	7.7	4.545	5.927	6.5 km	–	catalog · MPC · JPL
(553428) 2011 PA_{1}	24 February 2006	MLS	Mount Lemmon	5.249	0.047	22.5	5.001	5.497	11 km	–	catalog · MPC · JPL
(553435) 2011 PV_{15}	20 September 2014	Pan-STARRS 1	Haleakala	5.252	0.093	21.0	4.766	5.738	6.2 km	–	catalog · MPC · JPL
(553437) 2011 QO_{3}	25 July 2011	Pan-STARRS 1	Haleakala	5.207	0.121	9.9	4.576	5.838	14 km	–	catalog · MPC · JPL
(554123) 2012 MN_{6}	21 June 2012	MLS	Mount Lemmon	5.213	0.077	26.8	4.812	5.613	7.4 km	–	catalog · MPC · JPL
(554166) 2012 QD_{23}	20 March 2007	MLS	Mount Lemmon	5.147	0.079	18.1	4.741	5.553	9.6 km	–	catalog · MPC · JPL
(554167) 2012 QS_{25}	24 August 2012	Spacewatch	Kitt Peak	5.286	0.028	15.1	5.136	5.436	8.2 km	–	catalog · MPC · JPL
(554176) 2012 QF_{40}	31 December 2007	Spacewatch	Kitt Peak	5.243	0.055	23.3	4.957	5.530	14 km	–	catalog · MPC · JPL
(554191) 2012 QD_{64}	17 August 2012	Pan-STARRS 1	Haleakala	5.185	0.060	7.9	4.875	5.494	6.7 km	–	catalog · MPC · JPL
(554194) 2012 QN_{65}	26 August 2012	Spacewatch	Kitt Peak	5.139	0.103	6.2	4.612	5.667	6.9 km	–	catalog · MPC · JPL
(554207) 2012 RB_{27}	14 September 2012	CSS	Catalina	5.125	0.078	29.7	4.726	5.524	10 km	–	catalog · MPC · JPL
(554228) 2012 SN_{6}	2 August 2011	Pan-STARRS 1	Haleakala	5.134	0.083	26.4	4.709	5.558	12 km	–	catalog · MPC · JPL
(554234) 2012 SK_{17}	20 April 2009	Spacewatch	Kitt Peak	5.208	0.134	25.1	4.512	5.904	8.7 km	–	catalog · MPC · JPL
(554281) 2012 TF	31 March 2008	Spacewatch	Kitt Peak	5.174	0.115	6.1	4.579	5.770	7.8 km	–	catalog · MPC · JPL
(554292) 2012 TC_{24}	8 October 2012	MLS	Mount Lemmon	5.259	0.054	32.6	4.973	5.545	7.6 km	–	catalog · MPC · JPL
(554630) 2012 VR_{40}	24 September 2011	MLS	Mount Lemmon	5.317	0.055	0.9	5.025	5.609	6.2 km	–	catalog · MPC · JPL
(555034) 2013 OT_{11}	26 August 2012	Spacewatch	Kitt Peak	5.253	0.062	27.0	4.926	5.580	8.2 km	–	catalog · MPC · JPL
(555159) 2013 RZ_{109}	3 September 2013	MLS	Mount Lemmon	5.199	0.037	2.1	5.007	5.390	6.7 km	–	catalog · MPC · JPL
(555168) 2013 RZ_{136}	14 September 2013	Pan-STARRS 1	Haleakala	5.155	0.101	16.1	4.635	5.676	7.2 km	–	catalog · MPC · JPL
(555173) 2013 SJ_{5}	31 March 2008	Spacewatch	Kitt Peak	5.270	0.065	11.7	4.930	5.611	10 km	–	catalog · MPC · JPL
(555272) 2013 TU_{200}	3 October 2013	MLS	Mount Lemmon	5.286	0.052	17.1	5.013	5.560	6.9 km	–	catalog · MPC · JPL
(555276) 2013 TV_{213}	9 October 2013	MLS	Mount Lemmon	5.244	0.034	3.7	5.067	5.422	6.4 km	–	catalog · MPC · JPL
(557082) 2014 SO_{349}	8 December 2015	Pan-STARRS 1	Haleakala	5.169	0.010	29.5	5.117	5.221	6.3 km	–	catalog · MPC · JPL
(557111) 2014 SE_{378}	22 September 2014	Pan-STARRS 1	Haleakala	5.310	0.060	29.1	4.994	5.626	10 km	–	catalog · MPC · JPL
(557165) 2014 TT_{44}	23 September 2014	Spacewatch	Kitt Peak	5.153	0.034	25.1	4.977	5.329	10 km	–	catalog · MPC · JPL
(557182) 2014 TG_{57}	30 April 2009	Spacewatch	Kitt Peak	5.093	0.072	27.2	4.726	5.460	8.8 km	–	catalog · MPC · JPL
(557191) 2014 TQ_{66}	29 April 2009	Spacewatch	Kitt Peak	5.204	0.048	14.3	4.955	5.453	9.8 km	–	catalog · MPC · JPL
(557202) 2014 TX_{75}	19 September 2014	Pan-STARRS 1	Haleakala	5.186	0.015	22.8	5.110	5.262	6.9 km	–	catalog · MPC · JPL
(557257) 2014 UA_{22}	11 April 2008	Spacewatch	Kitt Peak	5.127	0.082	7.9	4.709	5.545	8.5 km	–	catalog · MPC · JPL
(557260) 2014 UQ_{27}	2 September 2014	La Palma	La Palma	5.307	0.056	23.3	5.011	5.603	9.1 km	–	catalog · MPC · JPL
(557334) 2014 US_{97}	23 October 2014	Spacewatch	Kitt Peak	5.120	0.076	19.2	4.732	5.507	7.2 km	–	catalog · MPC · JPL
(557546) 2014 WU_{4}	4 October 2013	MLS	Mount Lemmon	5.263	0.030	22.1	5.105	5.421	7.1 km	–	catalog · MPC · JPL
(557548) 2014 WN_{6}	31 March 2008	MLS	Mount Lemmon	5.294	0.018	24.6	5.197	5.391	11 km	–	catalog · MPC · JPL
(557596) 2014 WK_{53}	7 April 2008	Spacewatch	Kitt Peak	5.182	0.121	7.9	4.557	5.807	7.6 km	–	catalog · MPC · JPL
(557679) 2014 WZ_{119}	17 May 2009	MLS	Mount Lemmon	5.182	0.047	32.4	4.940	5.424	15 km	–	catalog · MPC · JPL
(557681) 2014 WD_{124}	27 June 2011	Spacewatch	Kitt Peak	5.142	0.079	17.0	4.738	5.547	11 km	–	catalog · MPC · JPL
(557757) 2014 WD_{211}	17 November 2014	Pan-STARRS 1	Haleakala	5.237	0.102	23.2	4.700	5.773	9.7 km	–	catalog · MPC · JPL
(557761) 2014 WB_{214}	4 April 2008	MLS	Mount Lemmon	5.208	0.060	12.7	4.894	5.522	8.7 km	–	catalog · MPC · JPL
(557920) 2014 WY_{383}	25 October 2013	MLS	Mount Lemmon	5.204	0.080	18.1	4.788	5.620	7.4 km	–	catalog · MPC · JPL
(558009) 2014 WO_{471}	28 November 2014	MLS	Mount Lemmon	5.144	0.075	17.6	4.757	5.532	6.8 km	–	catalog · MPC · JPL
(558011) 2014 WC_{472}	28 January 2006	Spacewatch	Kitt Peak	5.211	0.096	10.1	4.710	5.712	9.1 km	–	catalog · MPC · JPL
(558012) 2014 WK_{472}	29 March 2008	Spacewatch	Kitt Peak	5.253	0.082	9.3	4.825	5.682	7.6 km	–	catalog · MPC · JPL
(558091) 2014 WE_{535}	20 November 2014	Pan-STARRS 1	Haleakala	5.310	0.054	24.5	5.024	5.596	10 km	–	catalog · MPC · JPL
(558104) 2014 WL_{564}	27 November 2014	Pan-STARRS 1	Haleakala	5.163	0.074	32.5	4.782	5.544	6.9 km	–	catalog · MPC · JPL
(558121) 2014 WC_{574}	22 November 2014	Pan-STARRS 1	Haleakala	5.295	0.049	27.7	5.037	5.554	8.3 km	–	catalog · MPC · JPL
(558167) 2014 XK_{40}	3 October 2013	Pan-STARRS 1	Haleakala	5.203	0.175	4.4	4.294	6.112	7.5 km	–	catalog · MPC · JPL
(558171) 2014 XQ_{44}	11 December 2014	MLS	Mount Lemmon	5.143	0.098	30.6	4.641	5.644	8.9 km	–	catalog · MPC · JPL
(558174) 2014 XB_{50}	1 December 2014	Pan-STARRS 1	Haleakala	5.165	0.037	30.5	4.971	5.358	8.3 km	–	catalog · MPC · JPL
(558175) 2014 XL_{50}	12 December 2014	Pan-STARRS 1	Haleakala	5.255	0.037	28.4	5.058	5.452	6.9 km	–	catalog · MPC · JPL
(558261) 2015 AJ_{5}	21 November 2014	Pan-STARRS 1	Haleakala	5.132	0.053	32.0	4.861	5.403	7.5 km	–	catalog · MPC · JPL
(558310) 2015 AT_{47}	16 May 2009	MLS	Mount Lemmon	5.250	0.054	30.1	4.968	5.531	9.0 km	–	catalog · MPC · JPL
(558364) 2015 AK_{95}	14 January 2015	Pan-STARRS 1	Haleakala	5.258	0.039	30.9	5.051	5.464	7.2 km	–	catalog · MPC · JPL
(558514) 2015 AW_{254}	26 October 2014	Pan-STARRS 1	Haleakala	5.283	0.078	25.4	4.868	5.697	11 km	–	catalog · MPC · JPL
(558736) 2015 BN_{111}	4 April 2008	MLS	Mount Lemmon	5.215	0.127	11.3	4.554	5.876	7.2 km	–	catalog · MPC · JPL
(562168) 2015 XQ_{260}	5 October 2013	MLS	Mount Lemmon	5.249	0.058	4.0	4.945	5.553	6.5 km	–	catalog · MPC · JPL
(562557) 2016 AM_{67}	12 December 2014	Pan-STARRS 1	Haleakala	5.224	0.152	20.7	4.430	6.019	9.9 km	–	catalog · MPC · JPL
(562585) 2016 AG_{88}	28 October 2014	Pan-STARRS 1	Haleakala	5.173	0.070	12.5	4.812	5.534	9.2 km	–	catalog · MPC · JPL
(563348) 2016 CA_{165}	17 October 2012	Pan-STARRS 1	Haleakala	5.193	0.057	8.0	4.899	5.487	7.0 km	–	catalog · MPC · JPL
(564961) 2016 YR_{5}	28 November 2014	Pan-STARRS 1	Haleakala	5.217	0.053	27.8	4.940	5.493	7.1 km	–	catalog · MPC · JPL
(564967) 2016 YA_{18}	23 December 2016	Pan-STARRS 1	Haleakala	5.112	0.087	31.3	4.665	5.558	7.0 km	–	catalog · MPC · JPL
(564968) 2016 YU_{18}	23 December 2016	Pan-STARRS 1	Haleakala	5.182	0.049	36.3	4.929	5.436	6.8 km	–	catalog · MPC · JPL
(565050) 2017 BL_{34}	10 March 2005	MLS	Mount Lemmon	5.191	0.053	32.4	4.915	5.468	11 km	–	catalog · MPC · JPL
(565140) 2017 BA_{97}	24 November 2014	Pan-STARRS 1	Haleakala	5.148	0.022	17.8	5.037	5.259	10 km	–	catalog · MPC · JPL
(565143) 2017 BT_{97}	20 December 2004	MLS	Mount Lemmon	5.254	0.082	13.4	4.825	5.684	11 km	–	catalog · MPC · JPL
(565147) 2017 BB_{99}	2 October 2014	Pan-STARRS 1	Haleakala	5.261	0.046	20.7	5.021	5.500	7.7 km	–	catalog · MPC · JPL
(565195) 2017 BB_{155}	27 January 2017	Pan-STARRS 1	Haleakala	5.132	0.059	32.9	4.827	5.437	6.8 km	–	catalog · MPC · JPL
(565196) 2017 BN_{156}	29 January 2017	Pan-STARRS 1	Haleakala	5.195	0.067	32.9	4.847	5.543	7.9 km	–	catalog · MPC · JPL
(565197) 2017 BM_{159}	28 January 2017	Pan-STARRS 1	Haleakala	5.286	0.099	9.9	4.765	5.807	8.2 km	–	catalog · MPC · JPL
(565270) 2017 DR_{6}	14 September 2013	Pan-STARRS 1	Haleakala	5.200	0.038	22.9	5.002	5.398	10 km	–	catalog · MPC · JPL
(565355) 2017 DP_{52}	22 November 2014	Pan-STARRS 1	Haleakala	5.265	0.058	27.5	4.959	5.571	8.7 km	–	catalog · MPC · JPL
(567066) 2019 DG	2 November 2015	Pan-STARRS 1	Haleakala	5.192	0.043	17.5	4.969	5.415	8.0 km	–	catalog · MPC · JPL
(567067) 2019 GA_{2}	26 October 2014	Pan-STARRS 1	Haleakala	5.306	0.040	25.7	5.092	5.520	9.7 km	–	catalog · MPC · JPL
(567068) 2019 GX_{12}	3 October 2013	Pan-STARRS 1	Haleakala	5.217	0.073	27.9	4.834	5.600	7.0 km	–	catalog · MPC · JPL
(567069) 2019 GF_{13}	5 September 2013	Spacewatch	Kitt Peak	5.187	0.028	17.7	5.040	5.334	7.4 km	–	catalog · MPC · JPL
(567071) 2019 GJ_{48}	2 May 2009	MLS	Mount Lemmon	5.194	0.094	23.4	4.708	5.681	9.2 km	–	catalog · MPC · JPL
(567074) 2019 KH_{5}	23 January 2006	Spacewatch	Kitt Peak	5.259	0.076	28.6	4.858	5.659	10 km	–	catalog · MPC · JPL
(567075) 2019 LD	4 February 2019	Pan-STARRS 1	Haleakala	5.214	0.200	20.2	4.169	6.258	7.2 km	–	catalog · MPC · JPL
(567076) 2019 LE	25 January 2006	Spacewatch	Kitt Peak	5.175	0.080	30.7	4.763	5.588	7.1 km	–	catalog · MPC · JPL
(567078) 2019 LV_{2}	15 April 2008	MLS	Mount Lemmon	5.179	0.023	31.0	5.059	5.300	7.4 km	–	catalog · MPC · JPL
(567080) 2019 NW	4 August 2011	Pan-STARRS 1	Haleakala	5.198	0.060	25.4	4.886	5.510	8.7 km	–	catalog · MPC · JPL
(567119) 2020 FE_{5}	8 October 2015	Pan-STARRS 1	Haleakala	5.154	0.045	23.5	4.922	5.386	6.8 km	–	catalog · MPC · JPL
(567120) 2020 HE_{37}	21 April 2020	MLS	Mount Lemmon	5.169	0.135	26.4	4.473	5.865	6.6 km	–	catalog · MPC · JPL
(567121) 2020 HK_{37}	28 April 2020	Pan-STARRS 1	Haleakala	5.251	0.094	22.3	4.760	5.743	5.9 km	–	catalog · MPC · JPL
(567218) 2000 SS_{378}	28 July 2011	Pan-STARRS 1	Haleakala	5.266	0.051	3.3	4.999	5.534	7.0 km	–	catalog · MPC · JPL
(567247) 2000 TT_{74}	15 March 2007	Spacewatch	Kitt Peak	5.336	0.098	10.6	4.813	5.859	9.2 km	–	catalog · MPC · JPL
(567461) 2001 TR_{268}	16 March 2007	MLS	Mount Lemmon	5.185	0.041	18.5	4.971	5.400	8.3 km	–	catalog · MPC · JPL
(567513) 2001 VL_{137}	25 October 2013	MLS	Mount Lemmon	5.260	0.032	6.4	5.093	5.427	8.0 km	–	catalog · MPC · JPL
(567530) 2001 WY_{106}	10 February 2008	MLS	Mount Lemmon	5.288	0.047	4.5	5.040	5.536	7.9 km	–	catalog · MPC · JPL
(567889) 2002 VC_{91}	4 November 2002	Spacewatch	Kitt Peak	5.167	0.038	16.2	4.972	5.362	11 km	–	catalog · MPC · JPL
(567906) 2002 XS_{124}	5 October 2013	Pan-STARRS 1	Haleakala	5.194	0.090	10.9	4.726	5.662	7.1 km	–	catalog · MPC · JPL
(568425) 2003 WX_{214}	20 November 2003	Kitt Peak	Kitt Peak	5.145	0.075	2.6	4.760	5.529	7.2 km	–	catalog · MPC · JPL
(568445) 2003 YJ_{184}	28 September 2013	MLS	Mount Lemmon	5.127	0.037	7.8	4.935	5.318	7.4 km	–	catalog · MPC · JPL
(568480) 2004 DK_{70}	26 February 2004	M. W. Buie; D. E. Trilling	Kitt Peak	5.188	0.079	2.3	4.781	5.596	7.1 km	–	catalog · MPC · JPL
(568909) 2004 XU_{70}	26 November 2003	Spacewatch	Kitt Peak	5.092	0.037	12.7	4.905	5.279	10 km	–	catalog · MPC · JPL
(568949) 2005 BA_{31}	16 January 2005	Mauna Kea	Mauna Kea	5.243	0.013	6.9	5.172	5.314	6.4 km	–	catalog · MPC · JPL
(568961) 2005 BM_{50}	7 April 2008	Spacewatch	Kitt Peak	5.147	0.047	10.7	4.903	5.391	8.8 km	–	catalog · MPC · JPL
(568972) 2005 BW_{54}	3 May 2009	MLS	Mount Lemmon	5.197	0.013	30.0	5.129	5.265	8.4 km	–	catalog · MPC · JPL
(568974) 2005 BJ_{56}	14 June 2009	MLS	Mount Lemmon	5.211	0.164	22.3	4.358	6.064	6.2 km	–	catalog · MPC · JPL
(568989) 2005 CT_{86}	4 February 2006	Spacewatch	Kitt Peak	5.189	0.034	8.9	5.014	5.363	8.4 km	–	catalog · MPC · JPL
(569986) 2006 BV_{57}	23 January 2006	Spacewatch	Kitt Peak	5.183	0.061	6.3	4.867	5.499	8.1 km	–	catalog · MPC · JPL
(570018) 2006 BG_{203}	31 January 2006	Spacewatch	Kitt Peak	5.227	0.046	18.7	4.985	5.469	6.8 km	–	catalog · MPC · JPL
(570024) 2006 BF_{211}	25 January 2006	Spacewatch	Kitt Peak	5.221	0.046	34.0	4.983	5.459	10 km	–	catalog · MPC · JPL
(570055) 2006 BP_{295}	1 July 2011	Spacewatch	Kitt Peak	5.109	0.052	19.5	4.842	5.376	7.3 km	–	catalog · MPC · JPL
(570056) 2006 BN_{298}	30 January 2006	Spacewatch	Kitt Peak	5.239	0.036	28.5	5.051	5.428	6.8 km	–	catalog · MPC · JPL
(570059) 2006 BF_{300}	23 January 2006	Spacewatch	Kitt Peak	5.162	0.033	29.1	4.990	5.334	6.8 km	–	catalog · MPC · JPL
(570070) 2006 CM_{29}	2 February 2006	Spacewatch	Kitt Peak	5.208	0.138	10.5	4.490	5.927	6.7 km	–	catalog · MPC · JPL
(570071) 2006 CC_{33}	2 February 2006	Spacewatch	Kitt Peak	5.208	0.040	6.7	5.001	5.416	9.2 km	–	catalog · MPC · JPL
(570073) 2006 CB_{34}	9 January 2006	Spacewatch	Kitt Peak	5.120	0.053	8.5	4.849	5.392	12 km	–	catalog · MPC · JPL
(570090) 2006 CG_{69}	27 January 2006	MLS	Mount Lemmon	5.141	0.052	10.0	4.876	5.406	8.4 km	–	catalog · MPC · JPL
(570115) 2006 DL_{78}	30 January 2006	Spacewatch	Kitt Peak	5.265	0.027	30.6	5.122	5.408	7.5 km	–	catalog · MPC · JPL
(570134) 2006 DN_{139}	25 February 2006	Spacewatch	Kitt Peak	5.323	0.064	8.4	4.980	5.665	8.0 km	–	catalog · MPC · JPL
(570167) 2006 DE_{223}	24 September 2012	MLS	Mount Lemmon	5.187	0.060	11.3	4.874	5.499	8.4 km	–	catalog · MPC · JPL
(570278) 2006 JL_{62}	5 January 2006	MLS	Mount Lemmon	5.058	0.033	5.9	4.889	5.228	8.4 km	–	catalog · MPC · JPL
(571177) 2007 DF_{128}	21 February 2007	Spacewatch	Kitt Peak	5.196	0.104	8.7	4.653	5.739	6.7 km	–	catalog · MPC · JPL
(571211) 2007 EM_{104}	11 March 2007	MLS	Mount Lemmon	5.105	0.087	6.5	4.660	5.551	8.0 km	–	catalog · MPC · JPL
(571228) 2007 EV_{167}	30 January 2006	Spacewatch	Kitt Peak	5.265	0.102	6.0	4.728	5.801	7.2 km	–	catalog · MPC · JPL
(571249) 2007 EP_{227}	13 March 2007	Spacewatch	Kitt Peak	5.311	0.018	8.8	5.216	5.406	8.0 km	–	catalog · MPC · JPL
(571269) 2007 EH_{241}	13 March 2007	Spacewatch	Kitt Peak	5.230	0.109	26.6	4.662	5.797	7.2 km	–	catalog · MPC · JPL
(571275) 2007 FT_{6}	16 March 2007	MLS	Mount Lemmon	5.172	0.124	21.2	4.530	5.815	7.7 km	–	catalog · MPC · JPL
(571297) 2007 FA_{59}	3 December 2015	MLS	Mount Lemmon	5.183	0.020	3.7	5.078	5.289	6.8 km	–	catalog · MPC · JPL
(572212) 2008 EA_{69}	13 January 2004	Spacewatch	Kitt Peak	5.280	0.081	16.7	4.855	5.705	12 km	–	catalog · MPC · JPL
(572218) 2008 EO_{85}	13 March 2008	MLS	Mount Lemmon	5.206	0.030	37.8	5.049	5.364	11 km	–	catalog · MPC · JPL
(572278) 2008 EG_{190}	13 March 2008	Spacewatch	Kitt Peak	5.201	0.077	6.1	4.801	5.602	7.5 km	–	catalog · MPC · JPL
(572282) 2008 EY_{190}	13 March 2008	Spacewatch	Kitt Peak	5.160	0.112	14.7	4.580	5.740	6.6 km	–	catalog · MPC · JPL
(572316) 2008 FB_{120}	31 March 2008	MLS	Mount Lemmon	5.065	0.052	6.5	4.800	5.331	6.5 km	–	catalog · MPC · JPL
(572320) 2008 FH_{132}	27 March 2008	MLS	Mount Lemmon	5.193	0.084	17.0	4.759	5.626	7.3 km	–	catalog · MPC · JPL
(572326) 2008 FL_{145}	29 March 2008	Spacewatch	Kitt Peak	5.231	0.047	4.9	4.987	5.474	8.0 km	–	catalog · MPC · JPL
(572327) 2008 FP_{145}	31 March 2008	MLS	Mount Lemmon	5.228	0.130	12.5	4.551	5.905	8.8 km	–	catalog · MPC · JPL
(572329) 2008 FJ_{146}	30 March 2008	Spacewatch	Kitt Peak	5.162	0.071	3.4	4.795	5.528	6.5 km	–	catalog · MPC · JPL
(572350) 2008 GA_{60}	5 April 2008	Spacewatch	Kitt Peak	5.227	0.114	6.9	4.632	5.822	8.0 km	–	catalog · MPC · JPL
(572355) 2008 GY_{77}	18 January 2005	Spacewatch	Kitt Peak	5.192	0.035	7.2	5.009	5.374	8.2 km	–	catalog · MPC · JPL
(572368) 2008 GV_{132}	14 April 2008	MLS	Mount Lemmon	5.219	0.078	29.9	4.812	5.625	9.0 km	–	catalog · MPC · JPL
(572374) 2008 GR_{149}	1 April 2008	MLS	Mount Lemmon	5.252	0.076	14.1	4.851	5.652	10 km	–	catalog · MPC · JPL
(572382) 2008 GH_{152}	13 October 2013	Spacewatch	Kitt Peak	5.116	0.080	25.9	4.707	5.525	7.8 km	–	catalog · MPC · JPL
(572383) 2008 GO_{152}	1 November 2013	MLS	Mount Lemmon	5.242	0.103	11.8	4.701	5.784	8.6 km	–	catalog · MPC · JPL
(572387) 2008 GU_{155}	15 April 2008	MLS	Mount Lemmon	5.193	0.135	10.2	4.491	5.895	6.4 km	–	catalog · MPC · JPL
(572399) 2008 GA_{163}	26 September 2012	MLS	Mount Lemmon	5.183	0.051	15.8	4.920	5.446	10 km	–	catalog · MPC · JPL
(572401) 2008 GL_{163}	4 October 2013	Spacewatch	Kitt Peak	5.192	0.069	29.1	4.832	5.551	8.1 km	–	catalog · MPC · JPL
(572402) 2008 GU_{163}	6 April 2008	Spacewatch	Kitt Peak	5.235	0.090	21.9	4.762	5.709	6.5 km	–	catalog · MPC · JPL
(572403) 2008 GG_{166}	4 April 2008	Spacewatch	Kitt Peak	5.260	0.071	5.4	4.889	5.631	8.0 km	–	catalog · MPC · JPL
(572408) 2008 GD_{168}	5 April 2008	MLS	Mount Lemmon	5.202	0.116	5.4	4.599	5.804	7.1 km	–	catalog · MPC · JPL
(572409) 2008 GR_{168}	3 April 2008	Spacewatch	Kitt Peak	5.257	0.108	9.2	4.689	5.825	7.0 km	–	catalog · MPC · JPL
(572428) 2008 HL_{75}	30 April 2008	MLS	Mount Lemmon	5.160	0.051	29.4	4.897	5.424	10 km	–	catalog · MPC · JPL
(572439) 2008 JK_{40}	4 May 2008	Spacewatch	Kitt Peak	5.312	0.019	20.2	5.209	5.414	11 km	–	catalog · MPC · JPL
(572455) 2008 JM_{47}	3 October 2013	Spacewatch	Kitt Peak	5.226	0.084	17.7	4.786	5.667	8.0 km	–	catalog · MPC · JPL
(572472) 2008 KX_{24}	28 May 2008	Spacewatch	Kitt Peak	5.254	0.065	16.8	4.915	5.593	8.8 km	–	catalog · MPC · JPL
(572474) 2008 KJ_{34}	14 April 2008	MLS	Mount Lemmon	5.239	0.009	25.7	5.190	5.289	6.5 km	–	catalog · MPC · JPL
(572490) 2008 KH_{47}	27 May 2008	Spacewatch	Kitt Peak	5.287	0.029	29.7	5.132	5.443	7.3 km	–	catalog · MPC · JPL
(573514) 2009 GT_{4}	3 April 2009	Cerro Burek	Cerro Burek	5.225	0.026	29.7	5.090	5.360	8.3 km	–	catalog · MPC · JPL
(573604) 2009 HS_{121}	30 April 2009	MLS	Mount Lemmon	5.209	0.096	14.4	4.708	5.710	8.7 km	–	catalog · MPC · JPL
(573612) 2009 HP_{124}	19 April 2009	Spacewatch	Kitt Peak	5.106	0.105	8.3	4.571	5.640	7.7 km	–	catalog · MPC · JPL
(573643) 2009 KZ_{42}	24 May 2009	MLS	Mount Lemmon	5.152	0.036	27.1	4.968	5.336	7.4 km	–	catalog · MPC · JPL
(573644) 2009 KA_{43}	17 May 2009	MLS	Mount Lemmon	5.138	0.021	30.0	5.030	5.246	7.3 km	–	catalog · MPC · JPL
(574269) 2010 GO_{95}	12 January 2018	Pan-STARRS 1	Haleakala	5.183	0.205	10.0	4.123	6.244	7.8 km	–	catalog · MPC · JPL
(574428) 2010 MN_{148}	19 June 2010	MLS	Mount Lemmon	5.222	0.075	7.4	4.832	5.611	7.1 km	–	catalog · MPC · JPL
(575199) 2011 LQ_{34}	11 June 2011	MLS	Mount Lemmon	5.222	0.062	24.2	4.899	5.544	7.6 km	–	catalog · MPC · JPL
(575233) 2011 ON_{70}	28 July 2011	Pan-STARRS 1	Haleakala	5.250	0.051	4.3	4.984	5.515	6.5 km	–	catalog · MPC · JPL
(575243) 2011 PU_{15}	14 October 2012	MLS	Mount Lemmon	5.192	0.062	24.1	4.872	5.511	6.6 km	–	catalog · MPC · JPL
(575254) 2011 QL_{3}	2 July 2011	Spacewatch	Kitt Peak	5.212	0.120	11.6	4.585	5.839	11 km	–	catalog · MPC · JPL
(575258) 2011 QU_{9}	1 December 2005	L. H. Wasserman; R. Millis	Kitt Peak	5.175	0.063	18.7	4.850	5.501	8.9 km	–	catalog · MPC · JPL
(575263) 2011 QY_{22}	29 April 2008	MLS	Mount Lemmon	5.221	0.109	6.8	4.650	5.793	6.3 km	–	catalog · MPC · JPL
(575275) 2011 QJ_{46}	29 August 2011	T. Lister	Haleakala	5.265	0.120	19.3	4.631	5.899	8.3 km	–	catalog · MPC · JPL
(575436) 2011 SM_{266}	20 September 2011	Pan-STARRS 1	Haleakala	5.206	0.151	8.2	4.419	5.994	7.1 km	–	catalog · MPC · JPL
(576365) 2012 PC_{53}	14 August 2012	Pan-STARRS 1	Haleakala	5.191	0.130	10.0	4.514	5.869	8.4 km	–	catalog · MPC · JPL
(576368) 2012 PL_{55}	13 August 2012	Pan-STARRS 1	Haleakala	5.203	0.046	26.0	4.966	5.439	9.7 km	–	catalog · MPC · JPL
(576379) 2012 QM_{10}	21 August 2012	Pan-STARRS 1	Haleakala	5.145	0.056	15.8	4.856	5.433	10 km	–	catalog · MPC · JPL
(576400) 2012 QX_{54}	25 August 2012	Pan-STARRS 1	Haleakala	5.138	0.077	28.0	4.741	5.534	8.6 km	–	catalog · MPC · JPL
(576430) 2012 SK_{2}	19 January 2005	Spacewatch	Kitt Peak	5.171	0.043	6.4	4.946	5.395	12 km	–	catalog · MPC · JPL
(576459) 2012 SE_{44}	28 July 2011	Pan-STARRS 1	Haleakala	5.276	0.093	4.7	4.784	5.769	8.5 km	–	catalog · MPC · JPL
(576479) 2012 SM_{72}	28 November 2014	Pan-STARRS 1	Haleakala	5.176	0.084	17.3	4.743	5.609	9.7 km	–	catalog · MPC · JPL
(576495) 2012 TJ	28 April 2008	MLS	Mount Lemmon	5.168	0.064	6.0	4.838	5.498	6.8 km	–	catalog · MPC · JPL
(576497) 2012 TX_{4}	5 October 2012	Pan-STARRS 1	Haleakala	5.144	0.073	6.6	4.768	5.521	8.4 km	–	catalog · MPC · JPL
(576500) 2012 TQ_{14}	13 July 2009	Cerro Burek	Cerro Burek	5.343	0.047	25.5	5.095	5.592	13 km	–	catalog · MPC · JPL
(576519) 2012 TJ_{52}	17 September 2012	MLS	Mount Lemmon	5.171	0.175	2.2	4.268	6.073	7.0 km	–	catalog · MPC · JPL
(576527) 2012 TP_{72}	9 October 2012	MLS	Mount Lemmon	5.130	0.038	9.9	4.934	5.325	7.0 km	–	catalog · MPC · JPL
(576593) 2012 TY_{208}	11 October 2012	MLS	Mount Lemmon	5.306	0.029	29.0	5.151	5.460	7.7 km	–	catalog · MPC · JPL
(576598) 2012 TR_{218}	15 September 2012	Spacewatch	Kitt Peak	5.337	0.048	27.0	5.079	5.595	8.5 km	–	catalog · MPC · JPL
(576628) 2012 TY_{268}	11 October 2012	MLS	Mount Lemmon	5.185	0.069	6.1	4.825	5.544	7.3 km	–	catalog · MPC · JPL
(576632) 2012 TK_{276}	11 October 2012	Pan-STARRS 1	Haleakala	5.183	0.100	7.7	4.665	5.701	6.7 km	–	catalog · MPC · JPL
(576673) 2012 TA_{345}	5 October 2013	Pan-STARRS 1	Haleakala	5.115	0.044	16.1	4.891	5.340	7.7 km	–	catalog · MPC · JPL
(576679) 2012 TR_{350}	3 October 2013	MLS	Mount Lemmon	5.183	0.099	30.3	4.671	5.696	6.9 km	–	catalog · MPC · JPL
(576687) 2012 TD_{358}	9 October 2012	MLS	Mount Lemmon	5.231	0.117	16.5	4.618	5.843	6.8 km	–	catalog · MPC · JPL
(576696) 2012 TP_{365}	7 October 2012	Pan-STARRS 1	Haleakala	5.263	0.027	27.0	5.123	5.403	9.7 km	–	catalog · MPC · JPL
(577714) 2013 OU_{11}	7 January 2016	Pan-STARRS 1	Haleakala	5.261	0.080	5.9	4.840	5.682	5.9 km	–	catalog · MPC · JPL
(577841) 2013 RV_{98}	3 September 2013	F. Hormuth	Calar Alto	5.186	0.022	5.9	5.069	5.302	7.7 km	–	catalog · MPC · JPL
(577842) 2013 RZ_{98}	28 August 2000	R. Millis; L. H. Wasserman	Cerro Tololo	5.244	0.064	7.8	4.906	5.582	7.3 km	–	catalog · MPC · JPL
(577853) 2013 RF_{132}	14 September 2013	Pan-STARRS 1	Haleakala	5.119	0.060	15.4	4.812	5.427	6.9 km	–	catalog · MPC · JPL
(577878) 2013 ST_{39}	4 March 2008	MLS	Mount Lemmon	5.128	0.122	19.0	4.504	5.752	11 km	–	catalog · MPC · JPL
(577913) 2013 TP_{31}	19 December 2004	MLS	Mount Lemmon	5.290	0.065	5.1	4.948	5.632	11 km	–	catalog · MPC · JPL
(577931) 2013 TD_{103}	2 October 2013	MLS	Mount Lemmon	5.253	0.074	11.6	4.863	5.643	7.6 km	–	catalog · MPC · JPL
(577971) 2013 TC_{193}	5 October 2013	Pan-STARRS 1	Haleakala	5.113	0.034	10.0	4.937	5.289	6.4 km	–	catalog · MPC · JPL
(577973) 2013 TX_{195}	1 October 2013	Spacewatch	Kitt Peak	5.187	0.128	19.0	4.525	5.849	9.7 km	–	catalog · MPC · JPL
(577978) 2013 TV_{200}	9 October 2013	MLS	Mount Lemmon	5.277	0.146	15.0	4.506	6.048	8.8 km	–	catalog · MPC · JPL
(578007) 2013 UG_{42}	31 October 2013	MLS	Mount Lemmon	5.215	0.076	24.1	4.818	5.612	6.6 km	–	catalog · MPC · JPL
(578008) 2013 UF_{43}	24 October 2013	MLS	Mount Lemmon	5.165	0.053	9.3	4.891	5.439	6.5 km	–	catalog · MPC · JPL
(578011) 2013 VC_{9}	27 January 2004	Spacewatch	Kitt Peak	5.297	0.076	15.2	4.895	5.699	11 km	–	catalog · MPC · JPL
(578036) 2013 VT_{46}	20 November 2014	Pan-STARRS 1	Haleakala	5.139	0.008	7.5	5.099	5.179	6.1 km	–	catalog · MPC · JPL
(578127) 2013 WE_{99}	10 October 2012	MLS	Mount Lemmon	5.294	0.066	18.0	4.945	5.643	8.8 km	–	catalog · MPC · JPL
(579499) 2014 SJ_{309}	31 March 2009	Spacewatch	Kitt Peak	5.097	0.072	37.6	4.728	5.467	9.7 km	–	catalog · MPC · JPL
(579560) 2014 TD_{96}	3 October 2014	MLS	Mount Lemmon	5.257	0.042	28.9	5.037	5.478	9.5 km	–	catalog · MPC · JPL
(579562) 2014 TT_{103}	5 October 2014	MLS	Mount Lemmon	5.233	0.051	7.6	4.964	5.503	6.9 km	–	catalog · MPC · JPL
(579588) 2014 UN_{88}	6 September 2013	Spacewatch	Kitt Peak	5.127	0.057	8.2	4.837	5.417	8.4 km	–	catalog · MPC · JPL
(579591) 2014 UO_{98}	15 October 2014	Spacewatch	Kitt Peak	5.147	0.083	23.3	4.719	5.576	8.8 km	–	catalog · MPC · JPL
(579608) 2014 UX_{168}	29 March 2008	Spacewatch	Kitt Peak	5.227	0.051	17.7	4.959	5.494	8.4 km	–	catalog · MPC · JPL
(579643) 2014 US_{255}	17 October 2014	Spacewatch	Kitt Peak	5.125	0.034	27.2	4.952	5.298	10 km	–	catalog · MPC · JPL
(579644) 2014 UB_{258}	14 August 2012	Pan-STARRS 1	Haleakala	5.161	0.086	7.2	4.719	5.603	8.0 km	–	catalog · MPC · JPL
(579645) 2014 UC_{258}	31 October 2014	MLS	Mount Lemmon	5.158	0.092	10.5	4.684	5.631	7.0 km	–	catalog · MPC · JPL
(579646) 2014 UK_{270}	28 October 2014	Spacewatch	Kitt Peak	5.182	0.058	9.6	4.879	5.484	7.5 km	–	catalog · MPC · JPL
(579649) 2014 VF_{8}	3 October 2014	MLS	Mount Lemmon	5.207	0.072	29.7	4.830	5.585	11 km	–	catalog · MPC · JPL
(579650) 2014 VH_{8}	6 May 2011	MLS	Mount Lemmon	5.123	0.065	21.0	4.790	5.456	10 km	–	catalog · MPC · JPL
(579658) 2014 VJ_{35}	15 September 2013	Pan-STARRS 1	Haleakala	5.160	0.100	14.4	4.643	5.678	9.7 km	–	catalog · MPC · JPL
(579660) 2014 VZ_{37}	2 September 2014	La Palma	La Palma	5.284	0.043	30.2	5.055	5.514	8.5 km	–	catalog · MPC · JPL
(579664) 2014 WD	13 March 2007	MLS	Mount Lemmon	5.212	0.023	2.2	5.092	5.333	6.9 km	–	catalog · MPC · JPL
(579705) 2014 WG_{129}	23 October 2014	Spacewatch	Kitt Peak	5.245	0.059	15.7	4.933	5.556	7.9 km	–	catalog · MPC · JPL
(579712) 2014 WW_{142}	17 November 2014	Pan-STARRS 1	Haleakala	5.261	0.066	3.6	4.912	5.611	6.7 km	–	catalog · MPC · JPL
(579734) 2014 WJ_{217}	14 October 2013	MLS	Mount Lemmon	5.181	0.045	10.2	4.949	5.413	8.8 km	–	catalog · MPC · JPL
(579795) 2014 WG_{402}	30 May 2009	MLS	Mount Lemmon	5.202	0.082	23.6	4.774	5.629	8.1 km	–	catalog · MPC · JPL
(579800) 2014 WP_{415}	20 November 2014	Pan-STARRS 1	Haleakala	5.261	0.063	21.3	4.927	5.595	8.2 km	–	catalog · MPC · JPL
(579824) 2014 WU_{456}	24 August 2012	Spacewatch	Kitt Peak	5.202	0.019	12.6	5.105	5.299	7.2 km	–	catalog · MPC · JPL
(579878) 2014 WV_{573}	23 November 2014	Pan-STARRS 1	Haleakala	5.254	0.021	31.2	5.146	5.362	8.5 km	–	catalog · MPC · JPL
(579882) 2014 WF_{591}	21 November 2014	Pan-STARRS 1	Haleakala	5.223	0.069	20.8	4.863	5.584	8.0 km	–	catalog · MPC · JPL
(579885) 2014 XU_{5}	29 March 2008	MLS	Mount Lemmon	5.181	0.082	16.5	4.754	5.608	11 km	–	catalog · MPC · JPL
(579886) 2014 XJ_{7}	2 December 2014	Pan-STARRS 1	Haleakala	5.127	0.084	29.2	4.698	5.555	8.6 km	–	catalog · MPC · JPL
(579887) 2014 XP_{9}	16 October 2014	MLS	Mount Lemmon	5.216	0.082	9.0	4.788	5.644	9.0 km	–	catalog · MPC · JPL
(579900) 2014 XV_{35}	24 October 2013	MLS	Mount Lemmon	5.157	0.113	8.8	4.573	5.742	8.0 km	–	catalog · MPC · JPL
(579902) 2014 XM_{40}	3 October 2013	Spacewatch	Kitt Peak	5.181	0.127	2.7	4.525	5.836	7.2 km	–	catalog · MPC · JPL
(579974) 2015 AT_{45}	29 March 2008	Spacewatch	Kitt Peak	5.180	0.015	27.9	5.103	5.257	7.3 km	–	catalog · MPC · JPL
(580075) 2015 AO_{258}	14 September 2013	Pan-STARRS 1	Haleakala	5.091	0.062	14.0	4.778	5.405	6.7 km	–	catalog · MPC · JPL
(582370) 2015 TA_{116}	21 November 2014	Pan-STARRS 1	Haleakala	5.222	0.006	29.6	5.190	5.254	6.2 km	–	catalog · MPC · JPL
(582447) 2015 TT_{416}	8 October 2015	Pan-STARRS 1	Haleakala	5.173	0.039	20.6	4.972	5.374	6.3 km	–	catalog · MPC · JPL
(582636) 2015 XD_{446}	8 December 2015	MLS	Mount Lemmon	5.215	0.045	8.1	4.982	5.448	7.0 km	–	catalog · MPC · JPL
(582637) 2015 XT_{448}	4 December 2015	Pan-STARRS 1	Haleakala	5.209	0.057	15.8	4.911	5.507	7.3 km	–	catalog · MPC · JPL
(582732) 2016 AX_{195}	31 October 2013	Spacewatch	Kitt Peak	5.320	0.069	7.3	4.952	5.688	8.0 km	–	catalog · MPC · JPL
(582777) 2016 AT_{311}	9 January 2016	Pan-STARRS 1	Haleakala	5.149	0.087	28.3	4.703	5.595	7.2 km	–	catalog · MPC · JPL
(584352) 2016 YL_{17}	23 December 2016	Pan-STARRS 1	Haleakala	5.185	0.075	31.0	4.795	5.574	8.3 km	–	catalog · MPC · JPL
(584356) 2017 AJ_{7}	3 October 2013	MLS	Mount Lemmon	5.203	0.128	15.6	4.538	5.869	9.7 km	–	catalog · MPC · JPL
(584363) 2017 AO_{32}	28 July 2011	Pan-STARRS 1	Haleakala	5.116	0.019	30.5	5.018	5.214	6.9 km	–	catalog · MPC · JPL
(584364) 2017 AG_{33}	15 October 2012	MLS	Mount Lemmon	5.255	0.133	11.4	4.556	5.953	7.1 km	–	catalog · MPC · JPL
(584385) 2017 BH_{80}	20 November 2014	Pan-STARRS 1	Haleakala	5.216	0.092	17.5	4.737	5.696	7.4 km	–	catalog · MPC · JPL
(584389) 2017 BO_{123}	9 March 2007	Spacewatch	Kitt Peak	5.213	0.106	9.2	4.659	5.767	8.0 km	–	catalog · MPC · JPL
(584394) 2017 BZ_{158}	29 January 2017	Pan-STARRS 1	Haleakala	5.201	0.056	23.1	4.908	5.495	8.4 km	–	catalog · MPC · JPL
(584395) 2017 BM_{160}	27 January 2017	Pan-STARRS 1	Haleakala	5.352	0.011	3.5	5.291	5.412	7.3 km	–	catalog · MPC · JPL
(584414) 2017 DK_{23}	28 July 2011	Pan-STARRS 1	Haleakala	5.231	0.095	28.2	4.734	5.728	6.7 km	–	catalog · MPC · JPL
(584465) 2017 FY_{10}	2 February 2005	Spacewatch	Kitt Peak	5.269	0.021	26.5	5.160	5.377	11 km	–	catalog · MPC · JPL
(584505) 2017 FE_{84}	18 January 2004	Spacewatch	Kitt Peak	5.251	0.040	19.7	5.042	5.461	12 km	–	catalog · MPC · JPL
(585381) 2018 FF_{9}	10 August 2012	Spacewatch	Kitt Peak	5.189	0.073	35.6	4.810	5.568	9.0 km	–	catalog · MPC · JPL
(585392) 2018 FF_{34}	17 March 2018	Pan-STARRS 1	Haleakala	5.212	0.057	5.7	4.916	5.507	5.8 km	–	catalog · MPC · JPL
(585765) 2019 CL_{13}	6 October 2012	Pan-STARRS 1	Haleakala	5.215	0.129	34.3	4.542	5.887	7.3 km	–	catalog · MPC · JPL
(585773) 2019 GF_{6}	12 January 2016	Pan-STARRS 1	Haleakala	5.294	0.042	29.7	5.073	5.515	7.7 km	–	catalog · MPC · JPL
(585784) 2019 GK_{13}	29 April 2008	MLS	Mount Lemmon	5.182	0.099	17.5	4.669	5.695	7.0 km	–	catalog · MPC · JPL
(585844) 2019 KD_{6}	14 September 2013	Pan-STARRS 1	Haleakala	5.280	0.032	26.4	5.110	5.451	7.7 km	–	catalog · MPC · JPL
(585852) 2019 LA_{3}	15 May 2009	MLS	Mount Lemmon	5.146	0.047	27.1	4.902	5.391	9.7 km	–	catalog · MPC · JPL
(585855) 2019 MO_{3}	24 April 2008	Spacewatch	Kitt Peak	5.155	0.106	19.7	4.608	5.701	11 km	–	catalog · MPC · JPL
(585898) 2020 HX_{66}	10 October 2012	MLS	Mount Lemmon	5.289	0.030	26.1	5.129	5.449	6.8 km	–	catalog · MPC · JPL
(587526) 2006 DG_{129}	1 February 2006	Spacewatch	Kitt Peak	5.280	0.089	31.1	4.811	5.749	9.0 km	–	catalog · MPC · JPL
(588083) 2007 HF_{10}	15 March 2007	Spacewatch	Kitt Peak	5.222	0.020	30.0	5.116	5.327	7.3 km	–	catalog · MPC · JPL
(588631) 2008 LM_{16}	5 April 2008	Spacewatch	Kitt Peak	5.122	0.055	37.5	4.840	5.404	8.7 km	–	catalog · MPC · JPL
(590792) 2012 TL_{214}	2 March 2006	Spacewatch	Kitt Peak	5.199	0.016	6.2	5.117	5.281	7.4 km	–	catalog · MPC · JPL
(591434) 2013 RY_{98}	3 September 2013	F. Hormuth	Calar Alto	5.319	0.032	8.2	5.152	5.487	6.9 km	–	catalog · MPC · JPL
(592523) 2015 AU_{48}	12 January 2015	Pan-STARRS 1	Haleakala	5.291	0.028	24.6	5.143	5.440	7.8 km	–	catalog · MPC · JPL
(594494) 2017 AP_{33}	4 January 2017	Pan-STARRS 1	Haleakala	5.129	0.062	38.4	4.812	5.445	7.9 km	–	catalog · MPC · JPL
(595016) 2000 SG_{386}	15 October 2012	Pan-STARRS 1	Haleakala	5.248	0.097	19.5	4.739	5.758	8.3 km	–	catalog · MPC · JPL
(595022) 2000 TJ_{77}	11 October 2012	MLS	Mount Lemmon	5.299	0.076	17.6	4.895	5.704	7.9 km	–	catalog · MPC · JPL
(595491) 2003 AB_{93}	1 January 2003	La Silla	La Silla	5.139	0.030	16.4	4.983	5.296	5.8 km	–	catalog · MPC · JPL
(596079) 2004 YF_{37}	14 November 2002	NEAT	Palomar	5.145	0.061	9.9	4.829	5.461	14 km	–	catalog · MPC · JPL
(596085) 2005 AO_{70}	15 January 2005	Spacewatch	Kitt Peak	5.212	0.084	23.5	4.774	5.649	13 km	–	catalog · MPC · JPL
(596707) 2006 BD_{117}	26 January 2006	Spacewatch	Kitt Peak	5.229	0.057	13.7	4.929	5.530	7.0 km	–	catalog · MPC · JPL
(596791) 2006 DA_{81}	3 December 2005	Mauna Kea	Mauna Kea	5.287	0.022	11.7	5.173	5.401	10 km	–	catalog · MPC · JPL
(596796) 2006 DX_{116}	27 February 2006	CSS	Catalina	5.206	0.061	30.3	4.891	5.522	11 km	–	catalog · MPC · JPL
(596801) 2006 DZ_{141}	25 February 2006	Spacewatch	Kitt Peak	5.259	0.073	6.3	4.875	5.642	6.8 km	–	catalog · MPC · JPL
(596854) 2006 EN_{82}	4 March 2006	Spacewatch	Kitt Peak	5.193	0.017	27.9	5.104	5.282	6.1 km	–	catalog · MPC · JPL
(597380) 2007 DQ_{124}	25 February 2007	MLS	Mount Lemmon	5.229	0.081	13.3	4.807	5.650	6.6 km	–	catalog · MPC · JPL
(597525) 2007 KY_{9}	16 September 2012	Spacewatch	Kitt Peak	5.238	0.027	8.7	5.094	5.382	7.5 km	–	catalog · MPC · JPL
(598073) 2008 ED_{29}	4 March 2008	MLS	Mount Lemmon	5.147	0.099	16.3	4.640	5.655	10 km	–	catalog · MPC · JPL
(598184) 2008 GT_{54}	5 April 2008	MLS	Mount Lemmon	5.084	0.051	13.6	4.825	5.343	6.8 km	–	catalog · MPC · JPL
(598243) 2008 GF_{168}	6 April 2008	MLS	Mount Lemmon	5.137	0.025	14.4	5.010	5.265	6.8 km	–	catalog · MPC · JPL
(598273) 2008 HN_{72}	21 September 2012	MLS	Mount Lemmon	5.155	0.074	5.2	4.774	5.536	6.2 km	–	catalog · MPC · JPL
(598314) 2008 KU_{28}	8 April 2008	Spacewatch	Kitt Peak	5.220	0.159	12.2	4.392	6.049	6.4 km	–	catalog · MPC · JPL
(599541) 2010 KL_{146}	2 March 2016	Pan-STARRS 1	Haleakala	5.243	0.069	38.5	4.882	5.604	7.1 km	–	catalog · MPC · JPL
(599570) 2010 MY_{147}	19 June 2010	MLS	Mount Lemmon	5.252	0.090	27.7	4.779	5.726	8.5 km	–	catalog · MPC · JPL

back to top
