= Faulkes Telescope Project =

Astronomy education project

The Faulkes Telescope Project (FTP) is supported by the Dill Faulkes Educational Trust. It provides access to 1,500 hours of observing time on two 2-metre class telescopes located in Hawaii (Faulkes Telescope North in Hawaii) and Australia (Faulkes Telescope South in Australia). This time is dedicated to education and public outreach, mainly in the UK, but also for smaller, selected projects in Europe and the US.

FTP has operated a UK-wide educational programme since 2004, and currently works with science education projects across Europe and further afield (e.g. USA, Russia, Israel), including many EU-based science, maths and ICT programmes. FTP specialises in providing physics and maths education and outreach via astronomy and space science, utilising the unique access it can provide to research-grade facilities. The basic philosophy is to engage learners in “real science”, making them active participants in a range of astronomical research projects, ranging from observations of the Solar System to distant galaxies. Teacher training (both face-to-face and online) is a core component of the FTP educational philosophy, and project staff have been involved in professional development work both in the UK and overseas, with teacher training days being held in Moscow, Santa Barbara, Munich, Lisbon, Paris and several other venues in Portugal and Spain.

FTP operates a broad range of educational programmes, with a strong emphasis on teacher training and engaging students with “real science”. A variety of research projects are currently being run on the FTs, with schools often participating in the role of data gatherers, particularly in long-term monitoring or short-term intensive studies or Target of Opportunity requests for transient objects (e.g. GRBs, supernovae, NEOs or X-ray systems in outburst).

The project also provides extensive educational materials which can be accessed and downloaded free of charge from their educational resources website. These resources include astronomy video tutorials, online astronomy training, paper-based documents for use in the classroom, and pre-packaged data from the telescopes to use with the exercises detailed online.

== Robotic Telescopes ==
The robotic telescopes used by the Faulkes Telescope Project are owned and operated by Las Cumbres Observatory Global Telescope Network (LCOGTN). Users must register for an account via FTP and, providing they meet the criteria for an account (as explained on the FTP website), the account details will be emailed out to the registered user. Students and teachers can then go online and book time on the telescope and run their own 29-minute-long real-time observational session on one of the telescopes, remotely controlling it over the internet. These telescopes are the largest robotic telescopes in the world available for UK schools to control in real time.

The project was the winner of the 2008 Sir Arthur Clarke Award in the category of Achievement in Education.

The Faulkes Telescope Projects in cooperation with Hands-On Universe runs many student observing projects such as supernovae observations, asteroid observations, the Lifecycle of Stars project and Hickson Compact Group of Galaxies project.
