= Faulkes Telescope North =

Telescope at the Haleakala Observatory

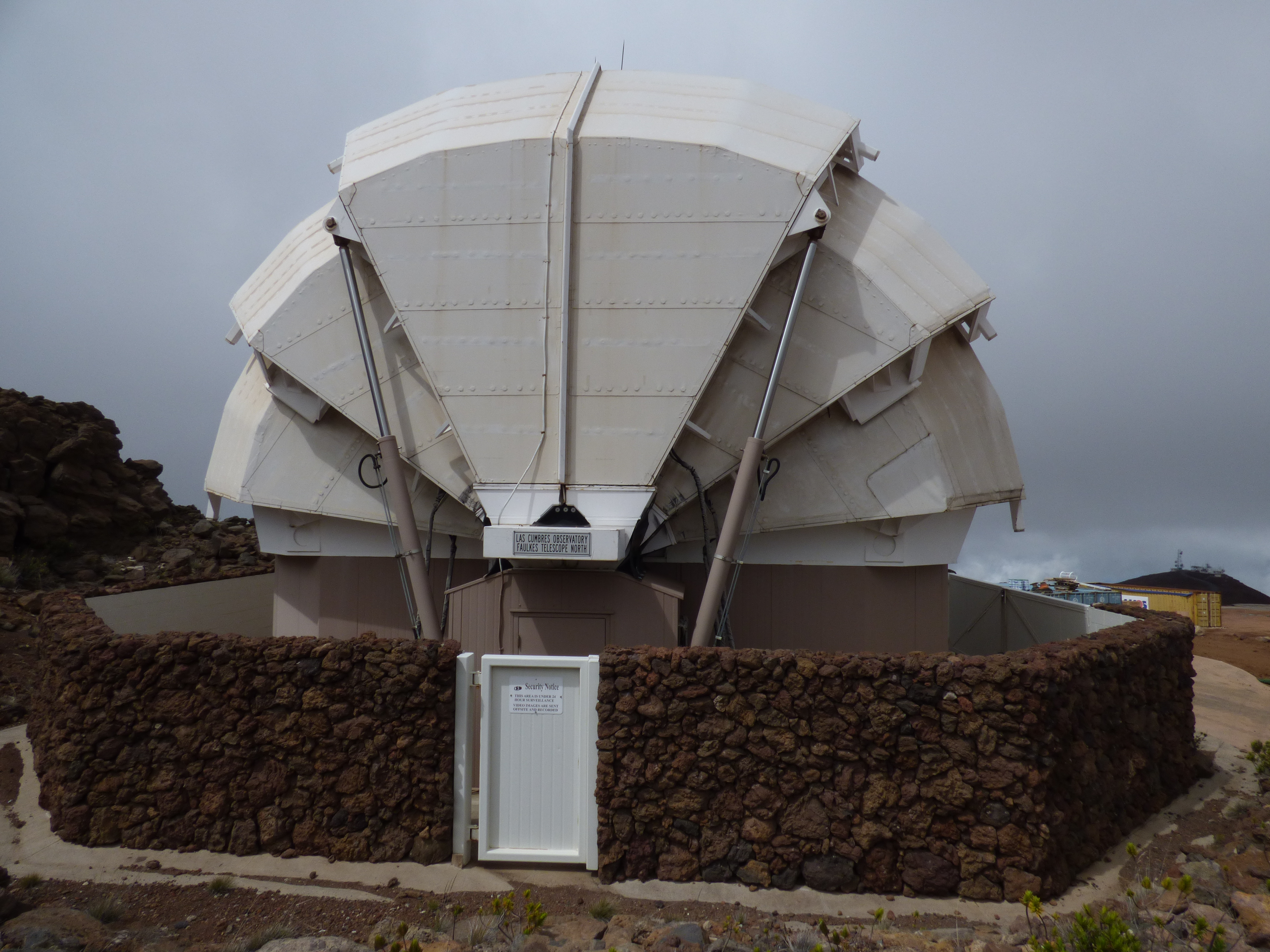
- Exterior of the Faulkes Telescope North facility
- Alternative names: FTN
- Named after: Dill Faulkes
- Part of: Las Cumbres Observatory
- Location: Haleakalā Observatory, Haleakalā, Maui County, Hawaii
- Coordinates: 20°42′25″N 156°15′27″W
- Organization: Las Cumbres Observatory
- Altitude: 3,052 m (10,013 ft)
- First light: 2003
- Telescope style: Ritchey–Chrétien telescope
- Diameter: 2 m (6 ft 7 in)
- Website: lco.global/observatory/telescopes/faulkes-telescope-north/
- Location within Hawaii
- Related media on Commons

The Faulkes Telescope North is a clone of the Liverpool Telescope, and is located at Haleakala Observatory in the U.S. state of Hawaii. It is a 2 m (79 in) f/10 Ritchey-Chrétien telescope. The telescope is owned and operated by LCOGT. This telescope and its sister telescope Faulkes Telescope South are used by research and education groups around the globe. The Faulkes Telescope Project is one such group which provides observing time (awarded by LCOGT) for educational projects for UK schools and amateur astronomers.

== History ==
The telescope was first proposed in 1998, when Dill Faulkes provided funding to the Royal Observatory to construct a telescope on Maui. The project also involved the Particle Physics and Astronomy Research Council, who proposed that the University of Hawaii run the telescope in exchange for receiving free research time. Faulkes provided $3 million to the project and an agreement was signed between his nonprofit, the Faulkes Telescope Corp, and the University of Hawaii on June 26, 1999. The agreement signing was attended by Governor Ben Cayetano and then-prince Andrew Mountbatten-Windsor. It was interrupted by a protestor, Charles Maxwell, who argued that the project had not considered the cultural and environmental impact of the telescope's mountain location.

A draft environmental assessment was published by the University of Hawaiʻi at Mānoa in January 2001. The assessment projected that the telescope would open within a year but was criticized by environmental activists and Native Hawaiians. Mary McEldowney-Evanson said that the plans for construction were too vague and Maxwell said that the Haleakalā National Park, where the telescope was to be built, was a sacred site and that the summit should not be disturbed. Construction of the telescope began in November 2001. The telescope captured its first image on 22 December 2003.

In 2005 the telescope became part of the Las Cumbres Observatory Global Telescope Network, which consists of over 20 telescopes around the world. That same year, the telescope captured the first images of the Deep Impact probe colliding with Tempel 1. In 2011 a British student using the telescope identified the breakup of a comet, 213P/Van Ness.

== Design and instruments ==
The telescope was built in Birkenhead. It consists of a 2-meter diameter main mirror with a one-fifth of a degree diameter field of view. The sensor is a charge-coupled device with four million pixels. It contains an infrared camera. In 2012 new spectrographs were installed in the telescope, allowing it to autonomously target points of observation without human intervention.

The telescope sits at the summit of Haleakalā, a shield volcano on the Hawaiian island of Maui. Its elevation is roughly 10,023 feet. It is part of the Haleakalā Observatory complex. In 2013 the telescope captured an image of the Herschel Space Observatory.

== Use ==
The Faulkes Telescope is used for both education and research. Hawaii students and residents are allowed to use the telescope during the early evening, while students and researchers in the United Kingdom can remotely operate the telescope later in the night. At the time of its construction, it was tied for the largest telescope exclusively reserved for student use, with the other being its twin, Faulkes Telescope South.

== See also ==
- List of largest optical reflecting telescopes
- Faulkes Telescope South
- Liverpool Telescope
