= Wayne Rosing =

American engineering manager (born 1946)

Wayne Rosing (born 1946) is an American engineering manager.

Rosing was an engineering manager at Digital Equipment Corporation (DEC) and Data General in the 1970s. He became a director of engineering at Apple Computer in 1980. There he led the Apple Lisa project, the forerunner to the Macintosh. He then went on to work at Sun Microsystems in 1985. After managing hardware development for products such as the SPARCstation, he became manager of Sun Microsystems Laboratories in 1990. From 1992 through 1996 he headed the spin-off First Person, which developed the Java Platform. He was then chief technology officer at Caere Corporation, which developed the optical character recognition product OmniPage.

Rosing served as vice president of engineering at Google from January 2001 to May 2005. In May 2005 he was appointed a senior fellow in mathematical and physical sciences at the University of California, Davis, and continued to serve as an advisor to Google.

As a hobby throughout his career, Rosing built telescopes, telescope control systems, and ground telescope mirrors. At Davis, Rosing consulted on the Large Synoptic Survey Telescope project (now the Vera C. Rubin Observatory).

In 2005, Rosing founded Las Cumbres Observatory Global Telescope Network. Rosing was CEO and chief engineer at the firm. The August 2007 edition of The Sky at Night covered Rosing at Las Cumbres.

In 2010, he co-endowed a chair in theoretical astrophysics at the University of California, Santa Barbara. It is held by Lars Bildsten.
