= 2008 HJ =

Asteroid

Discovery
- Discovered by: LINEAR
- Discovery site: Lincoln Lab ETS
- Discovery date: 24 April 2008

Designations
- Minor planet category: NEO · Apollo

Orbital characteristics
- Epoch 21 November 2025 (JD 2461000.5)
- Uncertainty parameter 6
- Aphelion: 2.29639 AU (343.535 Gm) (Q)
- Perihelion: 0.967561 AU (144.7451 Gm) (q)
- Semi-major axis: 1.63198 AU (244.141 Gm) (a)
- Eccentricity: 0.40712 (e)
- Orbital period (sidereal): 2.08 yr (761.50 d)
- Mean anomaly: 139.306° (M)
- Mean motion: 0° 28^{m} 21.907^{s} /day (n)
- Inclination: 0.923627° (i)
- Longitude of ascending node: 47.4545° (Ω)
- Argument of perihelion: 204.2086° (ω)
- Earth MOID: 0.00185855 AU (278,035 km)
- Jupiter MOID: 2.74944 AU (411.310 Gm)

Physical characteristics
- Dimensions: 12×24 m
- Mass: 5 million kg (assumed)
- Sidereal rotation period: 42.7 s (0.01185 h)
- Absolute magnitude (H): 25.85

2008 HJ is a sub-kilometer asteroid, classified as near-Earth object of the Apollo group.

It was discovered by Lincoln Laboratory ETS, New Mexico. Observers M. Bezpalko, D. Torres, R. Kracke, G. Spitz, J. Kistler. Richard Miles using the Faulkes Telescope South at Siding Spring Observatory, Australia determined that the asteroid rotates rapidly. It measures only 12 m by 24 m and is very dense, having a mass of about 5,000 tonnes. If the asteroid were not dense, it is probable that the rapid rotation would cause the asteroid to disrupt and fly apart.

At the time of discovery, 2008 HJ had the smallest known rotation period in the Solar System, completing one revolution every 42.7 seconds.

It is listed on the Sentry Risk Table with a 1 in 17,000 chance of impacting Earth on May 2, 2081. An impact from this object would be comparable to the Chelyabinsk meteor.

== See also ==
- List of fast rotators (minor planets)
