= Liverpool Telescope =

Telescope at Garafía, La Palma, the Canary Islands, Spain

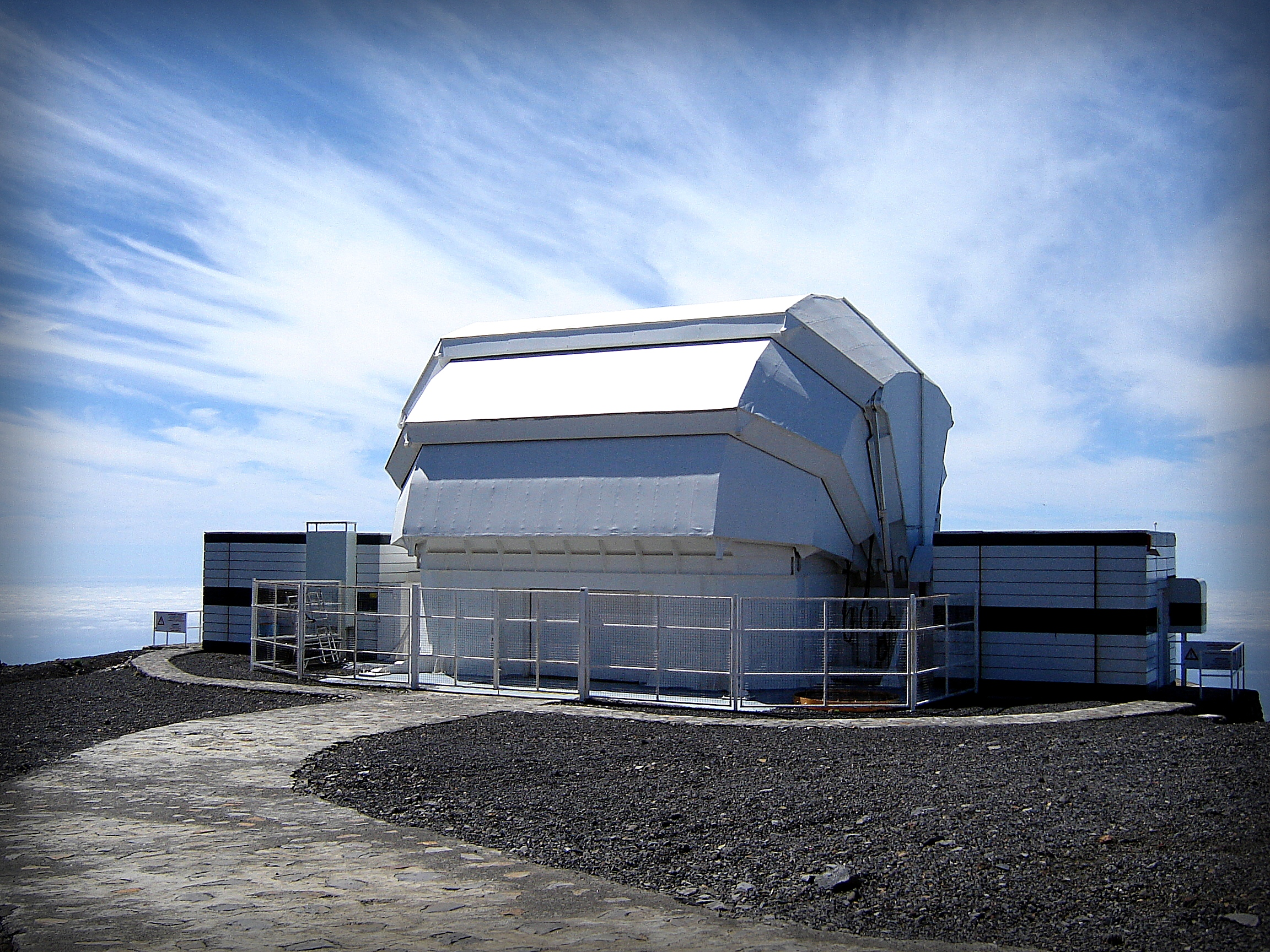
- Location(s): Garafía, Province of Santa Cruz de Tenerife, Canary Islands, Spain
- Coordinates: 28°45′44″N 17°52′45″W
- Altitude: 2,363 m (7,753 ft)
- Diameter: 2 m (6 ft 7 in)
- Website: telescope.livjm.ac.uk
- Location within Canary Islands
- Related media on Commons

The Liverpool Telescope (LT) is a two-metre-aperture (Note: 6.6-foot in imperial terms) robotic Ritchey–Chrétien telescope that observes autonomously (without human intervention). However professional astronomers, school groups and other credible registered users submit specifications to be considered by its robotic control system (RCS) at any time using an online graphical user interface. Each night the RCS decides among these choices, and among any notified or glimpsed transient events, what to observe, based on target visibility and weather conditions.

The telescope had first light in 2003, and is the brainchild and property of Liverpool John Moores University.

== Description ==
Liverpool Telescope Logo

The RCS has a rapid-response capability where it will often automatically interrupt regular observations to slew (shift) to observe short-lived events with higher priority, such as gamma-ray bursts.

The LT is one of the largest robotic telescopes in the world and was built by a subsidiary (Note: Telescope Technologies Limited) set up by Liverpool John Moores University who own and masterminded it. It is operated (maintained) by the Astrophysics Research Institute, partly funded by the UK's STFC. It is at the Roque de los Muchachos Observatory on La Palma.

Along with the Faulkes Telescope North and South, it is available for use by school children around the world over the internet. The registration and time allocation for the LT is organised by the National Schools Observatory.

The Liverpool Telescope is one of the primary players in the Heterogeneous Telescope Networks Consortium, a global collaboration between major research groups in the field of robotic telescopes which seeks a standard for communication between remote telescopes, telescope users, and other scientific resources.

Plans for an improved version, the New Robotic Telescope (NRT), are underway.

== See also ==
- List of largest optical reflecting telescopes
- List of large optical telescopes
