= Las Cumbres Observatory =

Nonprofit organization and astronomical observatory

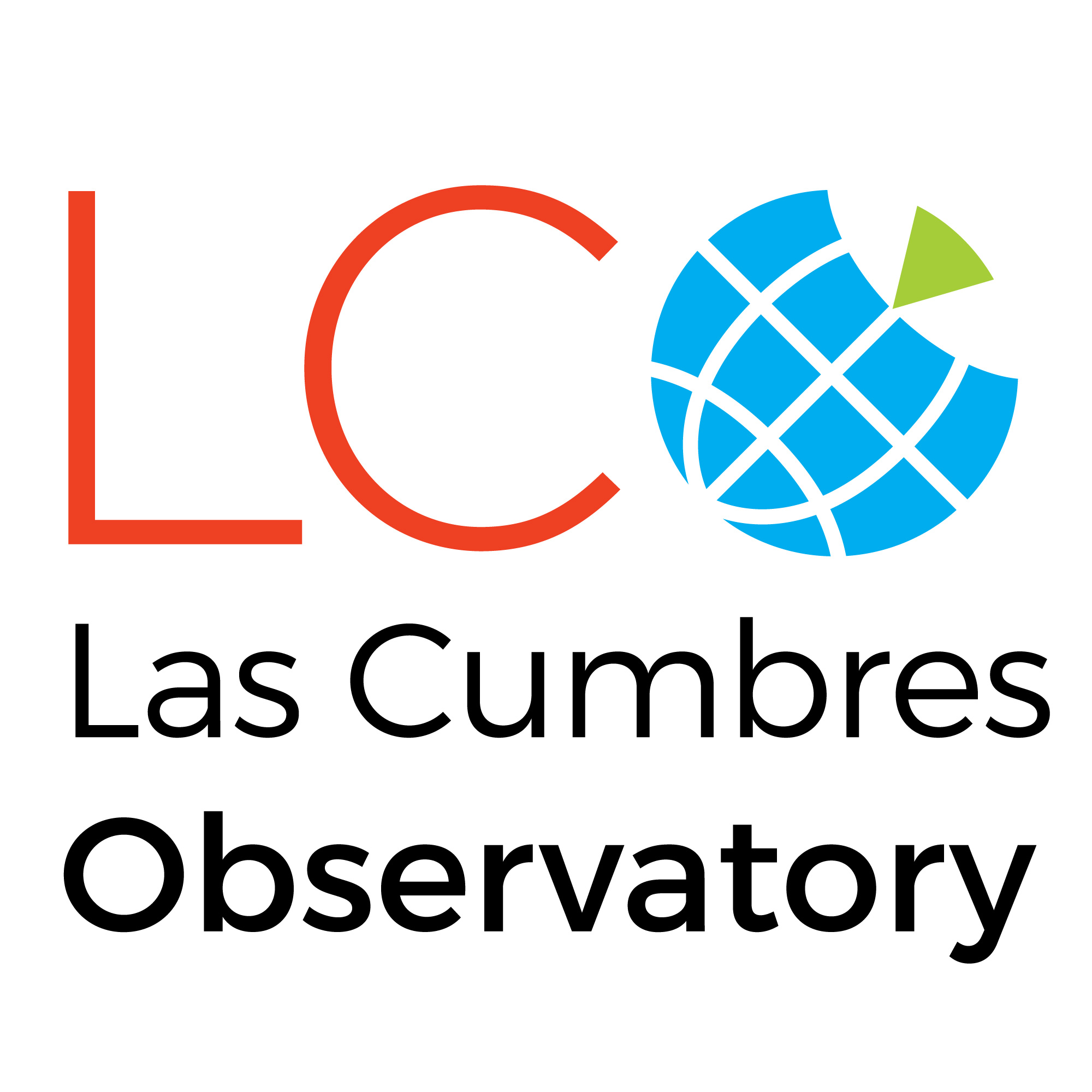

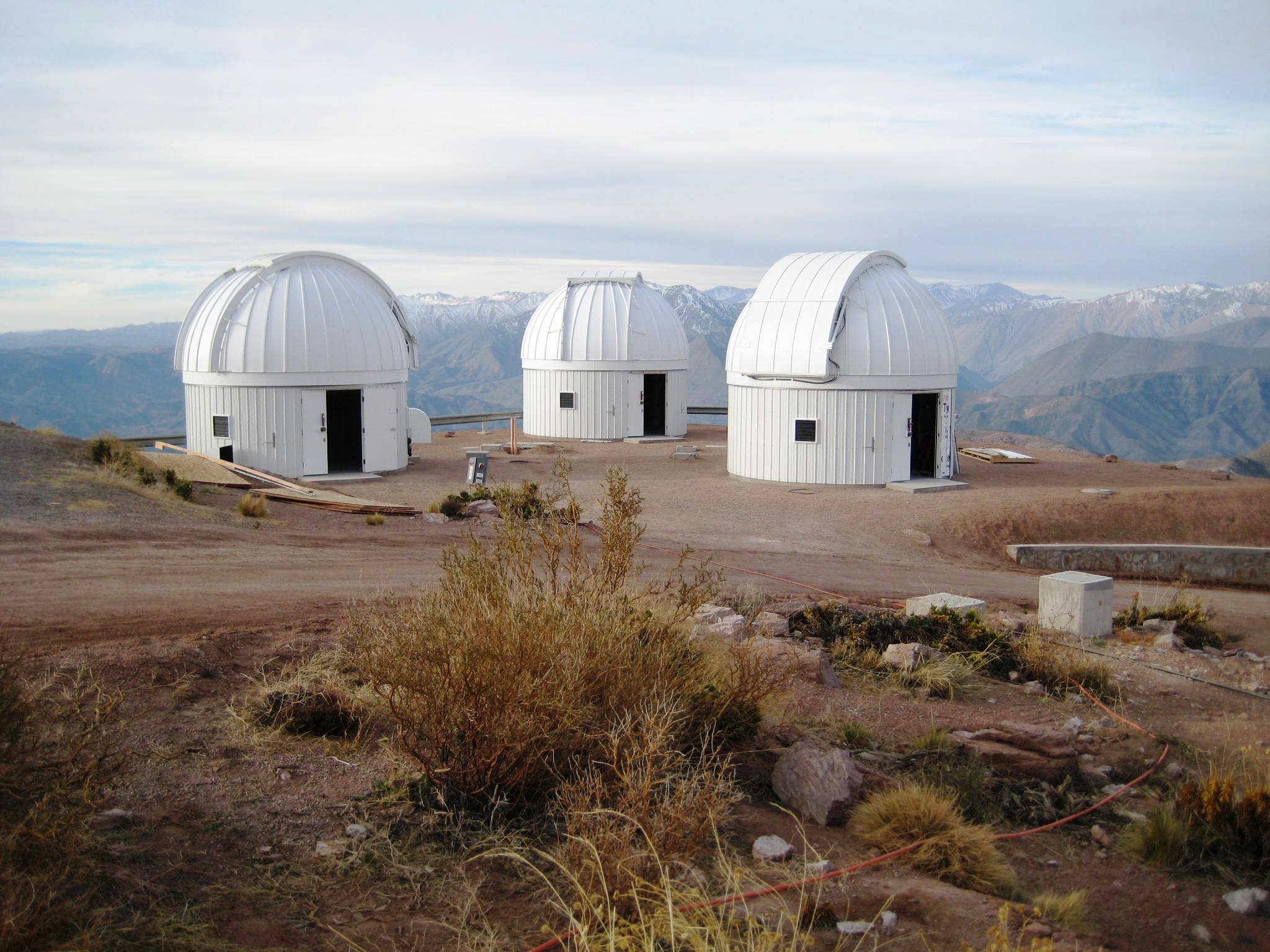
- LCO node at Cerro Tololo, Chile.
- Founded: September 2005
- Founder: Wayne Rosing
- Type: Not-for-profit organization, 501(c)(3)
- Location: Goleta, California, U.S.
- Coordinates: 34°25′58″N 119°51′47″W
- Key people: Lars Bildsten (BoD), Lisa Storrie-Lombardi (President & Observatory Director), Dorothy Largay (BoD), Wayne Rosing (BoD), Michael Skrutskie (BoD)
- Website: www.lco.global

Las Cumbres Observatory (LCO) is a network of astronomical observatories run by a non-profit private operating foundation directed by the technologist Wayne Rosing. Its offices are in Goleta, California. The telescopes are located at both northern and southern hemisphere sites distributed in longitude around the Earth. For some astronomical objects, the longitudinal spacing of telescopes allows continuous observations over 24 hour or longer. The operating network currently consists of two 2-meter telescopes, nine 1-meter telescopes, and seven 40-centimeter telescopes, placed at six astronomical observatories. The network operates as a single, integrated observing facility, using a software scheduler that continuously optimizes the planned observing schedule of each individual telescope.

== History ==
Rosing incorporated Las Cumbres Observatory in 1993 with the goal of aiding universities, observatories, and individuals in the acquisition and improvement of telescopes, optics, and instrumentation. He also set the objective for the organization to build and implement a global telescope system. In 2005, Rosing established the global telescope version of Las Cumbres Observatory.

LCO initially acquired the two Faulkes 2-meter telescopes. Faulkes Telescope North (FTN) located at Haleakala Observatory, on Maui, Hawaii, and Faulkes Telescope South (FTS) at Siding Spring Observatory (SSO), in eastern Australia. LCO also purchased the company that built the Faulkes telescopes, Telescope Technologies Limited of Liverpool, with the intent of installing additional 2-meter telescopes at different sites to form a robotically operated network. Over the next few years, Rosing and the LCO staff came to understand that a network composed of many smaller telescopes would provide greater observing capacity. The organization designed its own 1-meter telescope with a plan to locate several of these at each chosen site. An even smaller 40-centimeter telescope was also developed primarily for use in education projects.

During 2012 and 2013, nine 1-meter telescopes were constructed and deployed to McDonald Observatory at Fort Davis, Texas; Cerro Tololo Interamerican Observatory (CTIO) in Chile; South African Astronomical Observatory (SAAO), near Sutherland, South Africa; and SSO in Australia. During 2015 and 2016, seven 40-centimeter telescopes were deployed to CTIO, Haleakala Observatory, SSO, and to Teide Observatory on Tenerife in the Canary Islands.

After completion of the construction and installation of these telescopes, LCO began its transition to operating a global observatory. In 2013, a board of directors was established and a president was hired to lead the organization. Full science scheduling began on 1 May 2014, with the two 2-meter and nine 1-meter telescopes operating as a single, integrated, observatory. The 40-centimeter telescopes were added to this system as they were commissioned.

The National Science Foundation made an award to LCO in 2016 through its Mid-Scale Innovations Program, purchasing access to the LCO network for all astronomers at U.S. institutions. The goal of this program is to prepare this community to carry out effective research following discoveries being made by current and future time-domain astronomy surveys.

== Telescope network ==
=== Sites ===
LCO operates its network at seven sites. The operating sites are all professional astronomical observatories.

In the southern hemisphere:

- Cerro Tololo Interamerican Observatory (CTIO) in Chile
- South African Astronomical Observatory (SAAO), near Sutherland, South Africa
- Siding Spring Observatory (SSO), in eastern Australia

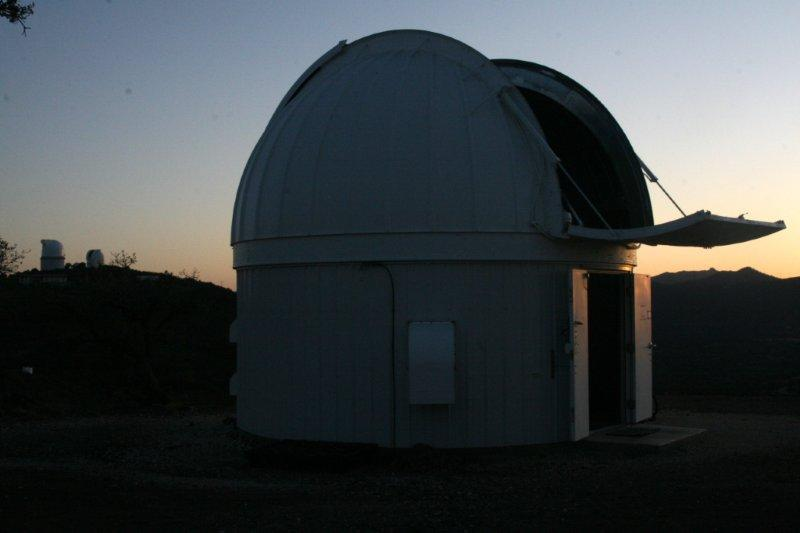
LCOGT commissioning at McDonald Observatory

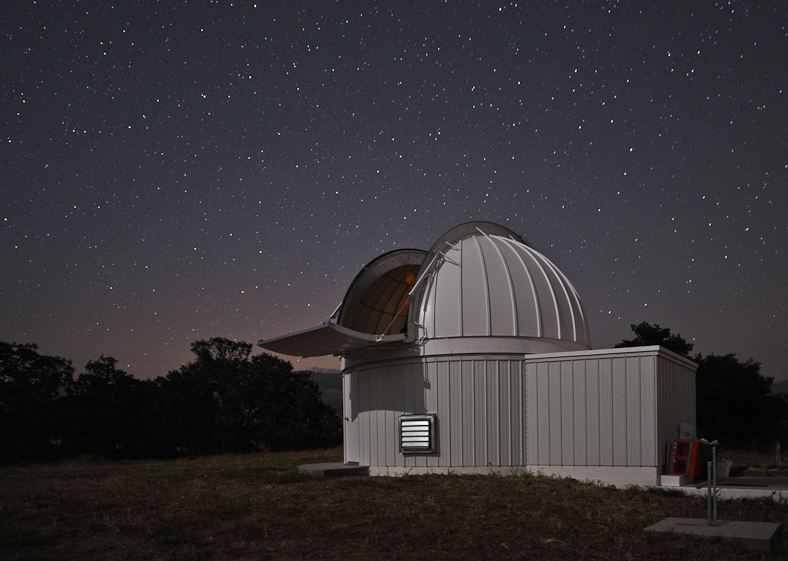
LCOGT 80 cm telescope enclosure at Sedgwick Reserve

In the northern hemisphere:

- McDonald Observatory at Fort Davis, Texas
- Haleakala Observatory, on Maui, Hawaii
- Teide Observatory on Tenerife in the Canary Islands

The Ngari Observatory in Ngari Prefecture, western Tibet, China was added as a node to the network.

LCO also operates an identical 1-meter telescope at its headquarters in Goleta for engineering development and a 0.8-meter telescope at Sedgwick Reserve near Santa Ynez, California.

=== Telescopes ===
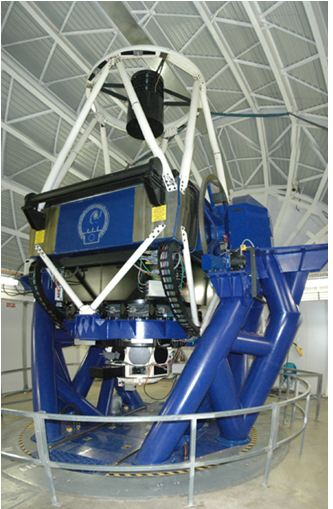
LCO 2 m Faulkes Telescope North

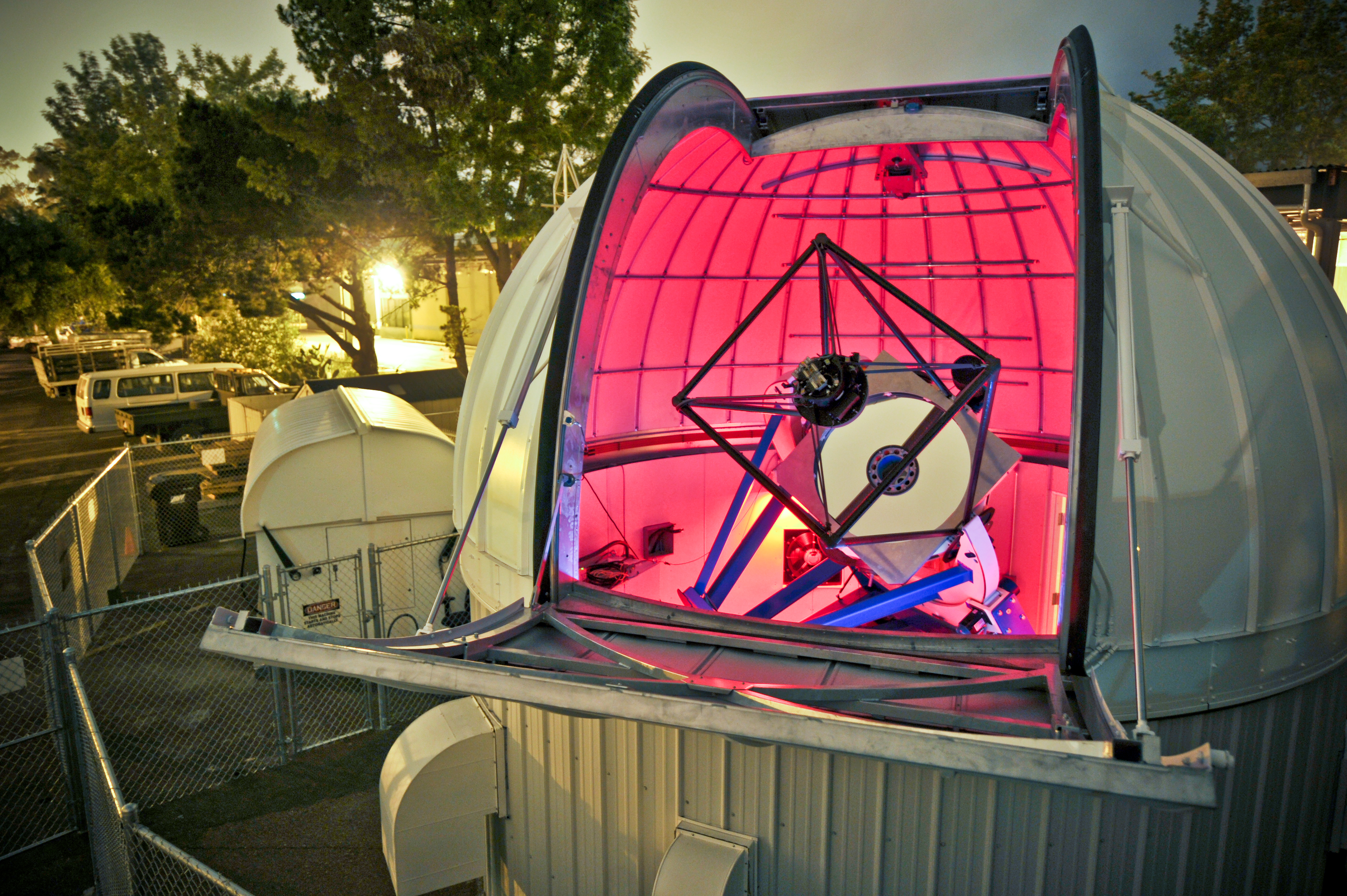
LCO 1 m Telescope prototype at Santa Barbara

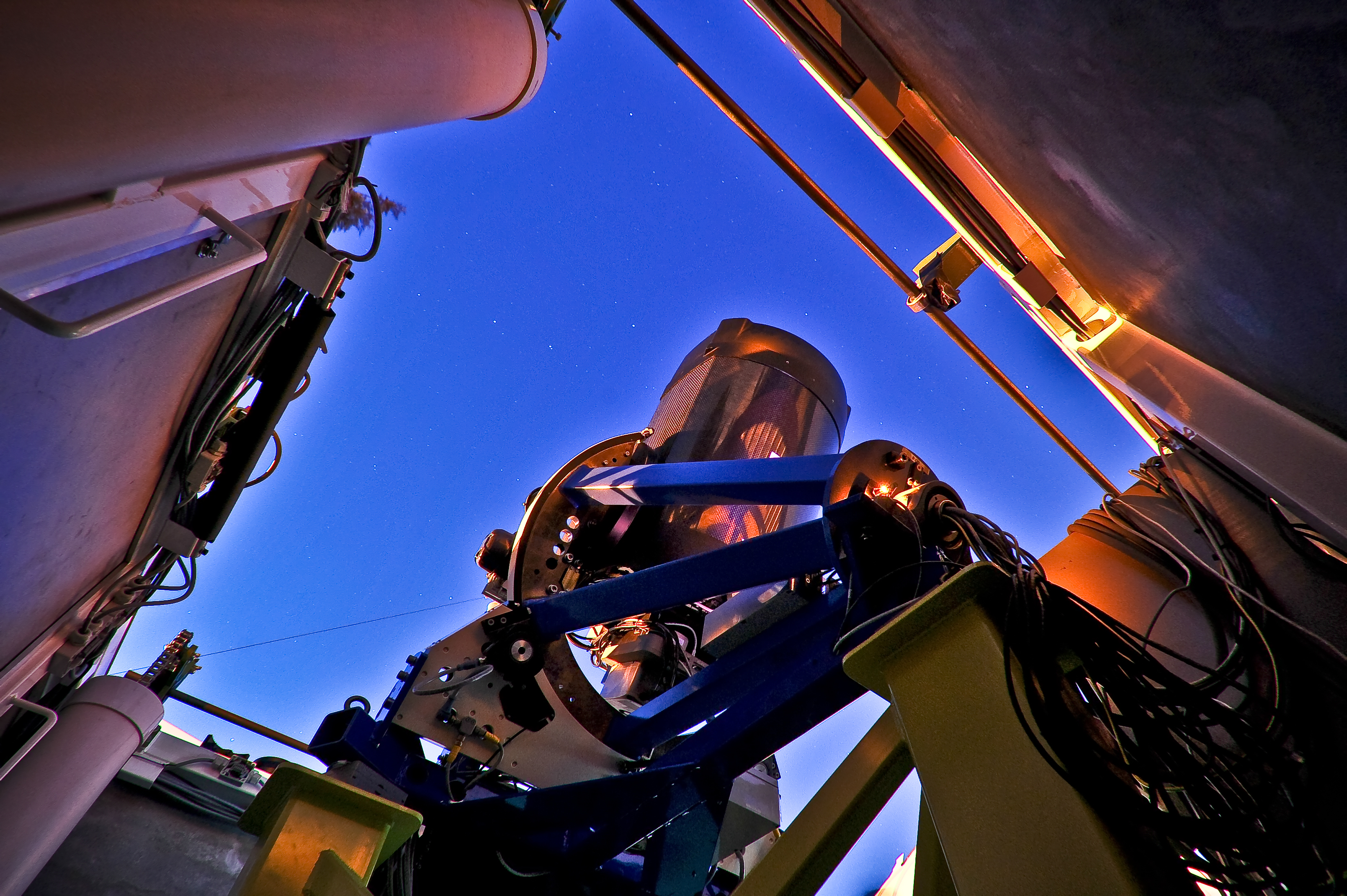
LCO 40 cm Telescope prototype at Santa Barbara

The 2-meter telescopes are the two Faulkes telescopes built by Telescope Technologies Ltd. They are f/10 Ritchey-Chrétien optical configurations on alt-az mounts.

The 1-meter telescopes are f/7.95 Ritchey-Chrétien optical systems on equatorial mounts. They have a 50-arcminute-diameter fully corrected field of view.

The 40-centimetre (16-inch) telescopes use the optics and tubes from Meade 16-inch RCX telescopes. The mount has been replaced by a scaled-down version of the LCO 1-meter telescope mount.

=== Instruments ===
The 2-meter telescopes are instrumented with optical imagers and low-resolution optical spectrographs (FLOYDS).

The 1-meter telescopes are instrumented with “Sinistro” optical imagers that have a 26-arcminute square field of view. During 2017, a set of high-resolution (R = 50,000), high-stability spectrographs (NRES) were deployed to four of the LCO sites to be coupled by optical fibres to the 1-meter telescopes.

The 40-centimetre (16-inch) telescopes are equipped with SBIG STX-6303 optical imagers.

=== Operation ===
The global telescope network operates as a single observatory. Users request observations only for a generic class of telescope/instrument, and the software scheduler determines an optimum observing schedule for each telescope. The scheduler revises the observing schedules for all telescopes as necessary and updates can be provided within 15 minutes. The rapid-response request mode bypasses the scheduler and can begin an observation within a few minutes after submission. Each telescope carries out a nightly calibration program and adjusts its pointing and focus several times per night.

The telescopes are all instrumented uniformly to facilitate the combining of data from multiple telescopes or sites. Data are returned to LCO headquarters, where they are processed to remove instrumental signature and ingested into an archive. Users have immediate access to their observations and all data are made public after 12 months.

== Usage ==
The network is available to researchers at institutions that are members of the LCO science collaboration. Institutions that operate the sites hosting the LCO telescopes and a few institutions that have contributed resources to help build the network are members of the collaboration. The entire U.S. astronomical community gained access to the LCO network in 2016 as a result of an award from the National Science Foundation's Mid-Scale Innovation Program. The program is administered through a peer-review proposal process run by the National Optical Astronomy Observatory. Several science teams and individuals also purchase time on the LCO network.

== Research ==
The design and operation of the LCO global telescope network provide the unique capabilities required for time-domain astronomy. The LCO network has the ability to observe objects or events continuously and obtain data rapidly upon the discovery or announcement of an event.

The LCO network has been used to study supernovae and other explosive transients; exoplanets, through observations of both transits and microlensing; asteroids; and AGN variability. In 2017 LCO played a critical part in two major discoveries: the first visible counterpart of a gravitational wave event, and a new type of supernova with successive explosions.

== Education ==
Since the beginning of LCO, education has been one of its core missions. In 2017, for the first time in LCO's history, it issued an open call for education partners, Global Sky Partners—groups who could use their robotic telescopes to inspire diverse audiences with educational and outreach projects that they support. In 2019 there are 20 LCO Global Sky Partners based in the US, Europe, Sub-Saharan Africa, the Middle East, Australia, or running entirely online programs, for students, teachers, and the wider public. In 2019 the reported direct impact of the program was 13,000 individuals exclusively using the LCO 0.4-meter network, predominantly school children and teachers.

The LCO education team also maintains in-house educational programs to trigger observations and make use of data from the LCO network. These programs are designed to inspire anyone with an interest in astronomy to explore science using robotic telescopes. Recent successful programs include Asteroid Tracker, Agent Exoplanet, and Serol's Cosmic Explorers.

== See also ==
- List of astronomical observatories
- Lists of telescopes
- Time-domain astronomy
- RoboNet
