= Dill Faulkes =

Martin C. "Dill" Faulkes
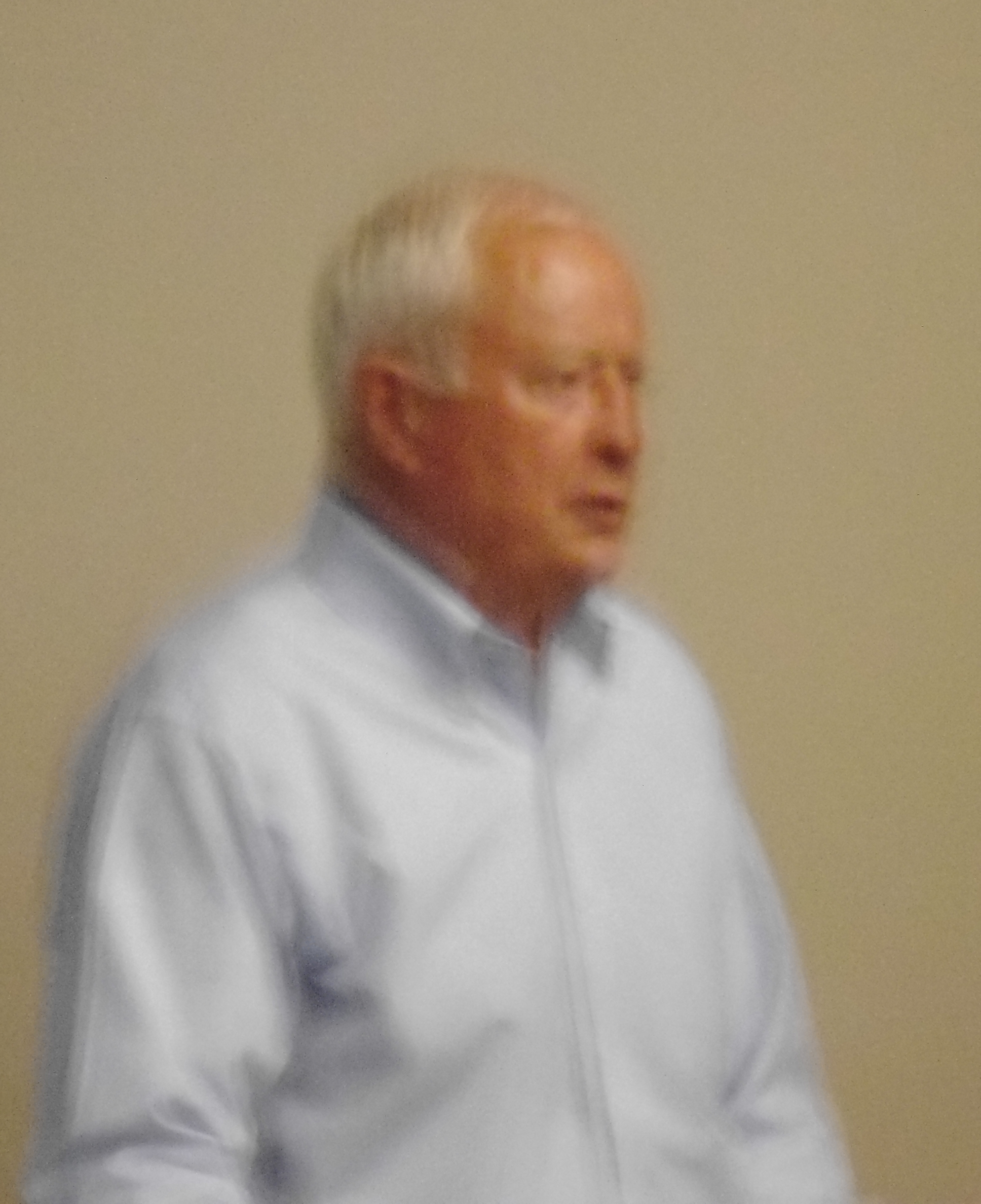
- Born: 1944 (age 80–81)

Martin C. "Dill" Faulkes (born 1944) is a British businessman.

Faulkes has a Special Mathematics degree from Hull University, a PhD in mathematics from Queen Elizabeth College, London and did postdoctoral work in general relativity.

He then left academia and went into software. He worked for the company Logica, then SPL, which was bought by Systems Designers. He then invested money in a variety of software companies and made a lot of money on the flotation of Triad and the private sale of SmartGroups.com.

== Philanthropy ==
He is chair of the Dill Faulkes Educational Trust which has made donations to a number of scientific causes including the Faulkes Telescope Project.

Faulkes contributed towards the building of Cambridge University's Centre for Mathematical Sciences and has the Faulkes Gatehouse and Faulkes Institute for Geometry named after him.

Faulkes is a gliding enthusiast having been part of Hull University's Flying Squadron as a student and for a time subsidised "mini-lessons" for children in gliding via the Faulkes Flying Foundation.

His trust has also funded "Bell projects" including replacing the bells at Trinity Church (Manhattan).

== Honours and awards ==
Faulkes has been made an honorary fellow by some UK academic institutions such as the E.A. Milne Centre for Astrophysics at Hull University. and in 2017 at Cardiff University. He subsequently returned an honorary doctorate awarded by the University of South Wales in protest at the university's decision to close its observational astronomy course.

He has had an asteroid (47144 Faulkes) named after him.
