= List of minor planets: 512001–513000 =

The following is a partial list of minor planets, running from minor-planet number 512001 through 513000, inclusive. The primary data for this and other partial lists is based on JPL's "Small-Body Orbital Elements" and data available from the Minor Planet Center. Critical list information is also provided by the MPC, unless otherwise specified from Lowell Observatory. A detailed description of the table's columns and additional sources are given on the main page including a complete list of every page in this series, and a statistical break-up on the dynamical classification of minor planets.

Also see the summary list of all named bodies in numerical and alphabetical order, and the corresponding naming citations for the number range of this particular list. New namings may only be added to this list after official publication, as the preannouncement of names is condemned by the Working Group for Small Bodies Nomenclature of the International Astronomical Union.

Near-Earth obj.	MBA (inner)	MBA (outer)	Centaur
Mars-crosser	MBA (middle)	Jupiter trojan	Trans-Neptunian obj.
Unclassified

== 512001–512100 ==
Designation			Discovery			Properties		Ref
Permanent	Provisional	Named after	Date	Site	Discoverer(s)	Category	Diam.	Ref
512001	2015 KZ_{153}	—	February 16, 2010	Catalina	CSS	·	1.7 km	MPC · JPL
512002	2015 KE_{160}	—	January 24, 2014	Haleakala	Pan-STARRS 1	·	1.4 km	MPC · JPL
512003	2015 KM_{160}	—	November 13, 2007	Kitt Peak	Spacewatch	EOS	2.0 km	MPC · JPL
512004	2015 KX_{164}	—	November 29, 2013	Mount Lemmon	Mount Lemmon Survey	·	1.5 km	MPC · JPL
512005	2015 KO_{165}	—	March 26, 2006	Kitt Peak	Spacewatch	·	1.7 km	MPC · JPL
512006	2015 KR_{165}	—	November 3, 2008	Mount Lemmon	Mount Lemmon Survey	MAR	940 m	MPC · JPL
512007	2015 LO_{1}	—	October 18, 2011	Haleakala	Pan-STARRS 1	TIR	3.2 km	MPC · JPL
512008	2015 LY_{1}	—	December 5, 2010	Mount Lemmon	Mount Lemmon Survey	PHO	780 m	MPC · JPL
512009	2015 LE_{12}	—	February 14, 2015	Mount Lemmon	Mount Lemmon Survey	·	1.5 km	MPC · JPL
512010	2015 LV_{21}	—	January 25, 2014	Haleakala	Pan-STARRS 1	·	1.2 km	MPC · JPL
512011	2015 LW_{22}	—	February 5, 2011	Haleakala	Pan-STARRS 1	·	610 m	MPC · JPL
512012	2015 LA_{24}	—	September 27, 2012	Haleakala	Pan-STARRS 1	·	3.1 km	MPC · JPL
512013	2015 LM_{26}	—	June 13, 2015	Haleakala	Pan-STARRS 1	·	1.4 km	MPC · JPL
512014	2015 LT_{30}	—	October 7, 2012	Haleakala	Pan-STARRS 1	·	1.2 km	MPC · JPL
512015	2015 LJ_{31}	—	May 5, 2003	Kitt Peak	Spacewatch	·	1.3 km	MPC · JPL
512016	2015 LV_{31}	—	May 9, 2014	Haleakala	Pan-STARRS 1	·	3.6 km	MPC · JPL
512017	2015 LA_{32}	—	June 13, 2015	Haleakala	Pan-STARRS 1	·	1.7 km	MPC · JPL
512018	2015 LC_{33}	—	January 16, 2013	Haleakala	Pan-STARRS 1	TEL	1.1 km	MPC · JPL
512019	2015 LD_{33}	—	January 16, 2013	Haleakala	Pan-STARRS 1	·	2.2 km	MPC · JPL
512020	2015 LO_{35}	—	April 15, 2015	Kitt Peak	Spacewatch	EMA	2.6 km	MPC · JPL
512021	2015 LG_{41}	—	October 21, 2008	Kitt Peak	Spacewatch	·	2.1 km	MPC · JPL
512022	2015 LB_{42}	—	May 24, 2006	Kitt Peak	Spacewatch	·	2.4 km	MPC · JPL
512023	2015 ML_{1}	—	April 10, 2015	Mount Lemmon	Mount Lemmon Survey	BAR	1.7 km	MPC · JPL
512024	2015 MH_{7}	—	December 18, 2004	Mount Lemmon	Mount Lemmon Survey	·	1.8 km	MPC · JPL
512025	2015 MW_{9}	—	April 15, 2007	Catalina	CSS	·	1.3 km	MPC · JPL
512026	2015 MV_{24}	—	April 20, 2015	Haleakala	Pan-STARRS 1	·	1.0 km	MPC · JPL
512027	2015 ME_{44}	—	March 25, 2010	Kitt Peak	Spacewatch	HNS	1.1 km	MPC · JPL
512028	2015 MS_{47}	—	January 15, 2004	Kitt Peak	Spacewatch	·	1.9 km	MPC · JPL
512029	2015 MG_{52}	—	February 10, 2014	Haleakala	Pan-STARRS 1	·	1.6 km	MPC · JPL
512030	2015 MK_{58}	—	October 24, 2011	Haleakala	Pan-STARRS 1	·	1.9 km	MPC · JPL
512031	2015 MG_{59}	—	July 29, 2009	Catalina	CSS	T_{j} (2.96) · CYB	3.4 km	MPC · JPL
512032	2015 MU_{65}	—	December 3, 2012	Mount Lemmon	Mount Lemmon Survey	·	1.2 km	MPC · JPL
512033	2015 ME_{66}	—	June 13, 2015	Mount Lemmon	Mount Lemmon Survey	(194)	1.9 km	MPC · JPL
512034	2015 MF_{66}	—	September 24, 2011	Haleakala	Pan-STARRS 1	·	2.3 km	MPC · JPL
512035	2015 MX_{66}	—	November 2, 2007	Mount Lemmon	Mount Lemmon Survey	·	2.2 km	MPC · JPL
512036	2015 MY_{66}	—	February 27, 2015	Haleakala	Pan-STARRS 1	MAR	1.3 km	MPC · JPL
512037	2015 MO_{67}	—	July 25, 2011	Haleakala	Pan-STARRS 1	·	1.3 km	MPC · JPL
512038	2015 MR_{67}	—	September 23, 2011	Haleakala	Pan-STARRS 1	·	1.9 km	MPC · JPL
512039	2015 MS_{68}	—	September 4, 2011	Haleakala	Pan-STARRS 1	·	2.0 km	MPC · JPL
512040	2015 MX_{69}	—	April 27, 2006	Catalina	CSS	·	2.5 km	MPC · JPL
512041	2015 MS_{76}	—	October 26, 2008	Kitt Peak	Spacewatch	·	2.2 km	MPC · JPL
512042	2015 MK_{77}	—	June 28, 2011	Mount Lemmon	Mount Lemmon Survey	·	970 m	MPC · JPL
512043	2015 MS_{79}	—	January 16, 2008	Kitt Peak	Spacewatch	·	1.7 km	MPC · JPL
512044	2015 MU_{79}	—	October 30, 2007	Mount Lemmon	Mount Lemmon Survey	NEM	2.1 km	MPC · JPL
512045	2015 MO_{81}	—	November 21, 2006	Mount Lemmon	Mount Lemmon Survey	·	1.8 km	MPC · JPL
512046	2015 MU_{81}	—	December 5, 2007	Catalina	CSS	·	1.2 km	MPC · JPL
512047	2015 ML_{85}	—	December 30, 2007	Kitt Peak	Spacewatch	·	2.3 km	MPC · JPL
512048	2015 MM_{85}	—	February 28, 2008	Mount Lemmon	Mount Lemmon Survey	EOS	1.8 km	MPC · JPL
512049	2015 MZ_{88}	—	June 18, 2015	Haleakala	Pan-STARRS 1	·	2.7 km	MPC · JPL
512050	2015 MH_{89}	—	December 11, 2012	Mount Lemmon	Mount Lemmon Survey	·	1.8 km	MPC · JPL
512051	2015 MX_{91}	—	September 8, 2011	Haleakala	Pan-STARRS 1	·	1.9 km	MPC · JPL
512052	2015 MK_{92}	—	April 6, 2011	Mount Lemmon	Mount Lemmon Survey	·	1.4 km	MPC · JPL
512053	2015 MK_{93}	—	February 11, 2014	Mount Lemmon	Mount Lemmon Survey	·	2.7 km	MPC · JPL
512054	2015 MA_{95}	—	January 31, 2014	Haleakala	Pan-STARRS 1	·	1.3 km	MPC · JPL
512055	2015 MH_{99}	—	June 23, 2015	Haleakala	Pan-STARRS 1	·	2.6 km	MPC · JPL
512056	2015 MW_{102}	—	February 1, 2009	Mount Lemmon	Mount Lemmon Survey	HNS	1.4 km	MPC · JPL
512057	2015 MH_{103}	—	September 9, 2010	Kitt Peak	Spacewatch	THM	1.9 km	MPC · JPL
512058	2015 MJ_{103}	—	March 24, 2014	Haleakala	Pan-STARRS 1	·	2.3 km	MPC · JPL
512059	2015 MY_{105}	—	November 8, 2007	Mount Lemmon	Mount Lemmon Survey	·	1.9 km	MPC · JPL
512060	2015 MR_{111}	—	April 5, 2014	Haleakala	Pan-STARRS 1	·	1.7 km	MPC · JPL
512061	2015 MB_{115}	—	October 30, 2008	Kitt Peak	Spacewatch	·	1.9 km	MPC · JPL
512062	2015 MF_{117}	—	December 5, 2013	Haleakala	Pan-STARRS 1	HNS	1.3 km	MPC · JPL
512063	2015 MH_{118}	—	May 4, 2014	Mount Lemmon	Mount Lemmon Survey	·	3.1 km	MPC · JPL
512064	2015 MA_{123}	—	August 13, 2010	Kitt Peak	Spacewatch	·	1.8 km	MPC · JPL
512065	2015 MQ_{123}	—	February 13, 2010	Mount Lemmon	Mount Lemmon Survey	·	960 m	MPC · JPL
512066	2015 MC_{125}	—	August 8, 2004	Socorro	LINEAR	·	3.5 km	MPC · JPL
512067	2015 MW_{126}	—	September 19, 2001	Apache Point	SDSS	·	2.4 km	MPC · JPL
512068	2015 MG_{132}	—	September 27, 2011	Mount Lemmon	Mount Lemmon Survey	·	2.1 km	MPC · JPL
512069	2015 MZ_{133}	—	April 4, 2014	Haleakala	Pan-STARRS 1	·	1.8 km	MPC · JPL
512070	2015 MD_{134}	—	January 2, 2009	Kitt Peak	Spacewatch	·	1.6 km	MPC · JPL
512071	2015 ME_{134}	—	December 27, 2006	Mount Lemmon	Mount Lemmon Survey	ARM	4.0 km	MPC · JPL
512072	2015 MN_{134}	—	May 3, 2014	Mount Lemmon	Mount Lemmon Survey	VER	2.5 km	MPC · JPL
512073	2015 MR_{134}	—	May 4, 2014	Haleakala	Pan-STARRS 1	·	3.0 km	MPC · JPL
512074	2015 MA_{135}	—	December 27, 2006	Mount Lemmon	Mount Lemmon Survey	HYG	3.3 km	MPC · JPL
512075	2015 MC_{135}	—	February 26, 2014	Haleakala	Pan-STARRS 1	·	1.2 km	MPC · JPL
512076	2015 NS_{4}	—	August 24, 2011	Haleakala	Pan-STARRS 1	JUN	1.0 km	MPC · JPL
512077	2015 NM_{5}	—	June 23, 2010	Mount Lemmon	Mount Lemmon Survey	·	2.7 km	MPC · JPL
512078	2015 NT_{6}	—	June 18, 2015	Haleakala	Pan-STARRS 1	VER	2.3 km	MPC · JPL
512079	2015 NM_{7}	—	January 30, 2006	Kitt Peak	Spacewatch	·	980 m	MPC · JPL
512080	2015 NW_{7}	—	June 13, 2010	Mount Lemmon	Mount Lemmon Survey	·	1.7 km	MPC · JPL
512081	2015 NR_{11}	—	March 31, 2011	Haleakala	Pan-STARRS 1	V	780 m	MPC · JPL
512082	2015 NQ_{12}	—	February 27, 2008	Mount Lemmon	Mount Lemmon Survey	·	2.4 km	MPC · JPL
512083	2015 NV_{14}	—	July 28, 2010	WISE	WISE	·	2.8 km	MPC · JPL
512084	2015 NT_{23}	—	September 24, 2008	Mount Lemmon	Mount Lemmon Survey	·	950 m	MPC · JPL
512085	2015 NW_{23}	—	June 27, 2015	Haleakala	Pan-STARRS 1	·	1.7 km	MPC · JPL
512086	2015 NV_{25}	—	October 1, 2003	Kitt Peak	Spacewatch	·	1.8 km	MPC · JPL
512087	2015 OF_{3}	—	January 10, 2007	Kitt Peak	Spacewatch	·	3.5 km	MPC · JPL
512088	2015 OH_{3}	—	June 25, 2010	WISE	WISE	·	3.7 km	MPC · JPL
512089	2015 OO_{7}	—	June 21, 2010	WISE	WISE	EUP	3.2 km	MPC · JPL
512090	2015 OS_{7}	—	February 10, 2007	Mount Lemmon	Mount Lemmon Survey	·	2.8 km	MPC · JPL
512091	2015 OP_{8}	—	June 29, 2015	Haleakala	Pan-STARRS 1	HNS	1.2 km	MPC · JPL
512092	2015 OA_{12}	—	February 13, 2013	Haleakala	Pan-STARRS 1	·	2.6 km	MPC · JPL
512093	2015 OE_{12}	—	April 25, 2003	Kitt Peak	Spacewatch	·	1.2 km	MPC · JPL
512094	2015 OO_{12}	—	May 8, 2006	Mount Lemmon	Mount Lemmon Survey	·	1.6 km	MPC · JPL
512095	2015 OA_{19}	—	November 8, 2008	Mount Lemmon	Mount Lemmon Survey	MAS	770 m	MPC · JPL
512096	2015 OX_{22}	—	December 15, 2004	Kitt Peak	Spacewatch	EUN	1.5 km	MPC · JPL
512097	2015 OY_{24}	—	May 11, 2007	Mount Lemmon	Mount Lemmon Survey	·	1.2 km	MPC · JPL
512098	2015 OG_{25}	—	December 18, 2003	Kitt Peak	Spacewatch	MAR	1.3 km	MPC · JPL
512099	2015 OQ_{25}	—	March 3, 2009	Catalina	CSS	·	2.8 km	MPC · JPL
512100	2015 OS_{29}	—	August 19, 2006	Kitt Peak	Spacewatch	·	2.3 km	MPC · JPL

== 512101–512200 ==
back to top

Designation			Discovery			Properties		Ref
Permanent	Provisional	Named after	Date	Site	Discoverer(s)	Category	Diam.	Ref
512101	2015 OC_{30}	—	August 4, 2008	Siding Spring	SSS	·	670 m	MPC · JPL
512102	2015 OZ_{32}	—	May 22, 2014	Kitt Peak	Spacewatch	·	2.7 km	MPC · JPL
512103	2015 OU_{34}	—	September 26, 2006	Mount Lemmon	Mount Lemmon Survey	·	1.9 km	MPC · JPL
512104	2015 OZ_{44}	—	October 26, 2011	Haleakala	Pan-STARRS 1	EOS	1.8 km	MPC · JPL
512105	2015 OE_{47}	—	May 21, 2006	Kitt Peak	Spacewatch	·	1.6 km	MPC · JPL
512106	2015 OV_{62}	—	November 27, 2006	Mount Lemmon	Mount Lemmon Survey	·	2.4 km	MPC · JPL
512107	2015 OW_{63}	—	August 10, 2010	WISE	WISE	·	3.3 km	MPC · JPL
512108	2015 OH_{65}	—	September 14, 2010	Mount Lemmon	Mount Lemmon Survey	·	2.5 km	MPC · JPL
512109	2015 OV_{66}	—	November 17, 2006	Mount Lemmon	Mount Lemmon Survey	·	3.5 km	MPC · JPL
512110	2015 OM_{68}	—	April 30, 2014	Haleakala	Pan-STARRS 1	·	2.4 km	MPC · JPL
512111	2015 OR_{72}	—	April 30, 2014	Haleakala	Pan-STARRS 1	EOS	1.5 km	MPC · JPL
512112	2015 OB_{74}	—	February 16, 2013	Mount Lemmon	Mount Lemmon Survey	·	2.7 km	MPC · JPL
512113	2015 OS_{74}	—	February 21, 2002	Kitt Peak	Spacewatch	EOS	1.9 km	MPC · JPL
512114	2015 OB_{77}	—	December 31, 2008	Kitt Peak	Spacewatch	·	1.8 km	MPC · JPL
512115	2015 OS_{83}	—	July 26, 2015	Haleakala	Pan-STARRS 1	·	3.1 km	MPC · JPL
512116	2015 OP_{84}	—	June 16, 2009	Mount Lemmon	Mount Lemmon Survey	·	4.1 km	MPC · JPL
512117	2015 OQ_{84}	—	September 11, 2010	Mount Lemmon	Mount Lemmon Survey	·	2.0 km	MPC · JPL
512118	2015 OV_{84}	—	August 8, 2005	Siding Spring	SSS	·	2.3 km	MPC · JPL
512119	2015 OX_{84}	—	November 20, 2007	Kitt Peak	Spacewatch	·	1.9 km	MPC · JPL
512120	2015 OC_{85}	—	October 29, 2005	Mount Lemmon	Mount Lemmon Survey	·	2.2 km	MPC · JPL
512121	2015 PU_{3}	—	July 26, 2008	Siding Spring	SSS	·	820 m	MPC · JPL
512122	2015 PB_{5}	—	October 19, 2011	Haleakala	Pan-STARRS 1	·	1.9 km	MPC · JPL
512123	2015 PY_{5}	—	November 1, 2006	Mount Lemmon	Mount Lemmon Survey	·	1.7 km	MPC · JPL
512124	2015 PK_{6}	—	October 10, 2005	Kitt Peak	Spacewatch	·	2.3 km	MPC · JPL
512125	2015 PU_{13}	—	August 23, 2004	Kitt Peak	Spacewatch	·	850 m	MPC · JPL
512126	2015 PQ_{17}	—	October 8, 2007	Catalina	CSS	·	1.7 km	MPC · JPL
512127	2015 PN_{29}	—	January 20, 2013	Kitt Peak	Spacewatch	·	2.9 km	MPC · JPL
512128	2015 PL_{30}	—	October 25, 2005	Mount Lemmon	Mount Lemmon Survey	·	2.3 km	MPC · JPL
512129	2015 PR_{30}	—	January 27, 2007	Kitt Peak	Spacewatch	·	3.1 km	MPC · JPL
512130	2015 PF_{31}	—	March 1, 2009	Mount Lemmon	Mount Lemmon Survey	GEF	1.4 km	MPC · JPL
512131	2015 PD_{32}	—	August 22, 2007	Anderson Mesa	LONEOS	·	990 m	MPC · JPL
512132	2015 PA_{35}	—	October 23, 2011	Haleakala	Pan-STARRS 1	EOS	2.1 km	MPC · JPL
512133	2015 PO_{36}	—	September 3, 2010	Mount Lemmon	Mount Lemmon Survey	·	2.1 km	MPC · JPL
512134	2015 PY_{41}	—	March 30, 2008	Kitt Peak	Spacewatch	·	2.5 km	MPC · JPL
512135	2015 PO_{47}	—	December 21, 2006	Mount Lemmon	Mount Lemmon Survey	·	2.7 km	MPC · JPL
512136	2015 PP_{49}	—	March 11, 2014	Mount Lemmon	Mount Lemmon Survey	CLO	2.1 km	MPC · JPL
512137	2015 PX_{60}	—	May 7, 2014	Haleakala	Pan-STARRS 1	·	2.3 km	MPC · JPL
512138	2015 PS_{62}	—	January 25, 2009	Kitt Peak	Spacewatch	·	1.7 km	MPC · JPL
512139	2015 PR_{63}	—	March 16, 2010	Kitt Peak	Spacewatch	·	1.4 km	MPC · JPL
512140	2015 PG_{82}	—	September 23, 2011	Haleakala	Pan-STARRS 1	·	1.6 km	MPC · JPL
512141	2015 PW_{101}	—	January 2, 2009	Kitt Peak	Spacewatch	·	1.5 km	MPC · JPL
512142	2015 PQ_{112}	—	July 18, 2015	Haleakala	Pan-STARRS 1	·	1.7 km	MPC · JPL
512143	2015 PY_{115}	—	October 1, 2005	Mount Lemmon	Mount Lemmon Survey	·	1.9 km	MPC · JPL
512144	2015 PW_{118}	—	October 29, 2008	Kitt Peak	Spacewatch	·	1.3 km	MPC · JPL
512145	2015 PB_{124}	—	August 8, 1999	Kitt Peak	Spacewatch	EOS	1.9 km	MPC · JPL
512146	2015 PQ_{130}	—	March 12, 2014	Mount Lemmon	Mount Lemmon Survey	·	1.6 km	MPC · JPL
512147	2015 PJ_{131}	—	August 10, 2015	Haleakala	Pan-STARRS 1	·	2.1 km	MPC · JPL
512148	2015 PR_{178}	—	April 5, 2014	Haleakala	Pan-STARRS 1	·	2.1 km	MPC · JPL
512149	2015 PS_{256}	—	March 3, 2009	Kitt Peak	Spacewatch	KOR	1.2 km	MPC · JPL
512150	2015 PL_{269}	—	May 27, 2006	Catalina	CSS	EUN	1.2 km	MPC · JPL
512151	2015 PR_{271}	—	February 8, 2007	Mount Lemmon	Mount Lemmon Survey	·	3.1 km	MPC · JPL
512152	2015 PR_{294}	—	December 6, 2011	Haleakala	Pan-STARRS 1	EOS	2.4 km	MPC · JPL
512153	2015 PF_{298}	—	June 18, 2014	Mount Lemmon	Mount Lemmon Survey	T_{j} (2.97)	3.6 km	MPC · JPL
512154	2015 PD_{299}	—	January 1, 2008	Kitt Peak	Spacewatch	AGN	1.0 km	MPC · JPL
512155	2015 PX_{305}	—	February 22, 2009	Kitt Peak	Spacewatch	·	1.4 km	MPC · JPL
512156	2015 PC_{314}	—	September 8, 2011	Kitt Peak	Spacewatch	·	2.2 km	MPC · JPL
512157	2015 PE_{314}	—	March 12, 2008	Kitt Peak	Spacewatch	·	1.9 km	MPC · JPL
512158	2015 QG_{10}	—	February 14, 2010	Mount Lemmon	Mount Lemmon Survey	·	1.4 km	MPC · JPL
512159	2015 RW_{25}	—	September 22, 2009	Mount Lemmon	Mount Lemmon Survey	·	3.1 km	MPC · JPL
512160	2015 RB_{29}	—	July 23, 2010	WISE	WISE	·	3.3 km	MPC · JPL
512161	2015 RW_{30}	—	February 22, 2007	Kitt Peak	Spacewatch	·	2.7 km	MPC · JPL
512162	2015 RK_{39}	—	September 7, 2004	Kitt Peak	Spacewatch	·	950 m	MPC · JPL
512163	2015 RS_{48}	—	September 21, 2011	Catalina	CSS	·	1.6 km	MPC · JPL
512164	2015 RR_{63}	—	October 7, 2004	Kitt Peak	Spacewatch	THM	2.1 km	MPC · JPL
512165	2015 RQ_{75}	—	July 25, 2011	Haleakala	Pan-STARRS 1	MAS	660 m	MPC · JPL
512166	2015 RJ_{85}	—	August 25, 2004	Kitt Peak	Spacewatch	·	3.7 km	MPC · JPL
512167	2015 RN_{85}	—	November 2, 2010	Mount Lemmon	Mount Lemmon Survey	·	3.8 km	MPC · JPL
512168	2015 RD_{88}	—	July 14, 2009	Kitt Peak	Spacewatch	·	3.5 km	MPC · JPL
512169	2015 RT_{91}	—	October 27, 2005	Kitt Peak	Spacewatch	·	710 m	MPC · JPL
512170	2015 RF_{95}	—	February 15, 2013	Haleakala	Pan-STARRS 1	·	3.3 km	MPC · JPL
512171	2015 RS_{99}	—	September 7, 1999	Kitt Peak	Spacewatch	·	2.6 km	MPC · JPL
512172	2015 RW_{99}	—	March 3, 2000	Socorro	LINEAR	·	2.2 km	MPC · JPL
512173	2015 RT_{100}	—	January 27, 2007	Mount Lemmon	Mount Lemmon Survey	EOS	2.1 km	MPC · JPL
512174	2015 RW_{103}	—	July 25, 2011	Haleakala	Pan-STARRS 1	·	1.1 km	MPC · JPL
512175	2015 RC_{104}	—	March 10, 2007	Kitt Peak	Spacewatch	·	940 m	MPC · JPL
512176	2015 RF_{104}	—	January 17, 2007	Kitt Peak	Spacewatch	EOS	2.0 km	MPC · JPL
512177	2015 RC_{114}	—	March 26, 2007	Mount Lemmon	Mount Lemmon Survey	·	3.3 km	MPC · JPL
512178	2015 RL_{117}	—	February 3, 2012	Haleakala	Pan-STARRS 1	·	2.8 km	MPC · JPL
512179	2015 RL_{119}	—	November 25, 2005	Catalina	CSS	·	2.9 km	MPC · JPL
512180	2015 RR_{120}	—	March 3, 2009	Kitt Peak	Spacewatch	·	2.8 km	MPC · JPL
512181	2015 RD_{134}	—	October 9, 2004	Kitt Peak	Spacewatch	·	2.8 km	MPC · JPL
512182	2015 RA_{202}	—	October 17, 2010	Mount Lemmon	Mount Lemmon Survey	EOS	1.9 km	MPC · JPL
512183	2015 RG_{202}	—	June 24, 2014	Haleakala	Pan-STARRS 1	·	2.9 km	MPC · JPL
512184	2015 RA_{213}	—	May 10, 2007	Kitt Peak	Spacewatch	·	1.3 km	MPC · JPL
512185	2015 RU_{218}	—	November 11, 2010	Mount Lemmon	Mount Lemmon Survey	·	2.3 km	MPC · JPL
512186	2015 RC_{221}	—	December 19, 2004	Mount Lemmon	Mount Lemmon Survey	·	1.1 km	MPC · JPL
512187	2015 RG_{236}	—	August 29, 2006	Kitt Peak	Spacewatch	JUN	720 m	MPC · JPL
512188	2015 RX_{236}	—	November 6, 2008	Mount Lemmon	Mount Lemmon Survey	·	970 m	MPC · JPL
512189	2015 RC_{243}	—	October 22, 2005	Kitt Peak	Spacewatch	·	2.8 km	MPC · JPL
512190	2015 RM_{243}	—	October 27, 2008	Mount Lemmon	Mount Lemmon Survey	·	900 m	MPC · JPL
512191	2015 RO_{252}	—	May 3, 2008	Mount Lemmon	Mount Lemmon Survey	·	3.4 km	MPC · JPL
512192	2015 RU_{252}	—	April 11, 2005	Mount Lemmon	Mount Lemmon Survey	·	1.7 km	MPC · JPL
512193	2015 RX_{252}	—	March 6, 2013	Haleakala	Pan-STARRS 1	·	2.6 km	MPC · JPL
512194	2015 SH_{3}	—	May 8, 2014	Haleakala	Pan-STARRS 1	·	2.4 km	MPC · JPL
512195	2015 SR_{10}	—	November 15, 2010	Mount Lemmon	Mount Lemmon Survey	VER	3.0 km	MPC · JPL
512196	2015 SW_{13}	—	November 25, 2006	Mount Lemmon	Mount Lemmon Survey	·	3.7 km	MPC · JPL
512197	2015 SC_{14}	—	April 7, 2005	Mount Lemmon	Mount Lemmon Survey	·	1.7 km	MPC · JPL
512198	2015 SY_{15}	—	October 4, 2004	Kitt Peak	Spacewatch	·	2.6 km	MPC · JPL
512199	2015 TF_{11}	—	December 7, 2005	Kitt Peak	Spacewatch	VER	3.5 km	MPC · JPL
512200	2015 TT_{11}	—	May 25, 2014	Haleakala	Pan-STARRS 1	DOR	3.1 km	MPC · JPL

== 512201–512300 ==
back to top

Designation			Discovery			Properties		Ref
Permanent	Provisional	Named after	Date	Site	Discoverer(s)	Category	Diam.	Ref
512201	2015 TE_{22}	—	December 29, 2011	Mount Lemmon	Mount Lemmon Survey	EOS	2.0 km	MPC · JPL
512202	2015 TW_{42}	—	October 17, 2006	Mount Lemmon	Mount Lemmon Survey	·	2.0 km	MPC · JPL
512203	2015 TV_{45}	—	October 1, 2000	Anderson Mesa	LONEOS	MAS	670 m	MPC · JPL
512204	2015 TX_{50}	—	November 9, 2010	Mount Lemmon	Mount Lemmon Survey	HYG	2.5 km	MPC · JPL
512205	2015 TM_{52}	—	September 15, 2004	Anderson Mesa	LONEOS	·	3.4 km	MPC · JPL
512206	2015 TP_{55}	—	February 3, 2012	Haleakala	Pan-STARRS 1	·	3.2 km	MPC · JPL
512207	2015 TQ_{76}	—	August 27, 2009	Kitt Peak	Spacewatch	THM	1.7 km	MPC · JPL
512208	2015 TZ_{139}	—	October 8, 2015	Haleakala	Pan-STARRS 1	·	2.3 km	MPC · JPL
512209	2015 TY_{151}	—	April 29, 2014	Haleakala	Pan-STARRS 1	·	1.6 km	MPC · JPL
512210	2015 TP_{160}	—	June 27, 2014	Haleakala	Pan-STARRS 1	·	2.9 km	MPC · JPL
512211	2015 TL_{165}	—	August 23, 2011	Haleakala	Pan-STARRS 1	·	1.1 km	MPC · JPL
512212	2015 TE_{190}	—	November 9, 2007	Mount Lemmon	Mount Lemmon Survey	·	1.2 km	MPC · JPL
512213	2015 TN_{191}	—	September 4, 2000	Kitt Peak	Spacewatch	·	1.1 km	MPC · JPL
512214	2015 TS_{192}	—	March 28, 2008	Mount Lemmon	Mount Lemmon Survey	·	2.4 km	MPC · JPL
512215	2015 TZ_{195}	—	September 16, 2006	Catalina	CSS	·	2.2 km	MPC · JPL
512216	2015 TE_{199}	—	October 23, 2004	Kitt Peak	Spacewatch	·	3.3 km	MPC · JPL
512217	2015 TJ_{199}	—	October 15, 2004	Mount Lemmon	Mount Lemmon Survey	·	2.4 km	MPC · JPL
512218	2015 TJ_{215}	—	August 20, 2011	Haleakala	Pan-STARRS 1	·	970 m	MPC · JPL
512219	2015 TC_{242}	—	September 28, 2009	Kitt Peak	Spacewatch	·	2.7 km	MPC · JPL
512220	2015 TH_{243}	—	January 18, 2008	Mount Lemmon	Mount Lemmon Survey	·	1.5 km	MPC · JPL
512221	2015 TW_{260}	—	July 2, 2015	Haleakala	Pan-STARRS 1	·	3.1 km	MPC · JPL
512222	2015 TU_{266}	—	October 27, 2008	Kitt Peak	Spacewatch	3:2	5.5 km	MPC · JPL
512223	2015 TP_{302}	—	September 11, 2007	XuYi	PMO NEO Survey Program	·	1.1 km	MPC · JPL
512224	2015 TY_{306}	—	December 27, 2011	Kitt Peak	Spacewatch	INA	3.0 km	MPC · JPL
512225	2015 TJ_{345}	—	March 13, 2002	Kitt Peak	Spacewatch	·	1.2 km	MPC · JPL
512226	2015 UP_{2}	—	March 21, 2002	Kitt Peak	Spacewatch	·	3.0 km	MPC · JPL
512227	2015 UP_{20}	—	March 28, 2008	Kitt Peak	Spacewatch	TIR	2.2 km	MPC · JPL
512228	2015 UQ_{43}	—	July 25, 2004	Anderson Mesa	LONEOS	·	2.6 km	MPC · JPL
512229	2015 UG_{73}	—	April 16, 2007	Mount Lemmon	Mount Lemmon Survey	·	3.6 km	MPC · JPL
512230	2015 UC_{83}	—	January 19, 2012	Mount Lemmon	Mount Lemmon Survey	·	2.5 km	MPC · JPL
512231	2015 VW_{14}	—	March 15, 2004	Kitt Peak	Spacewatch	·	620 m	MPC · JPL
512232	2015 VU_{24}	—	September 15, 2004	Anderson Mesa	LONEOS	·	2.2 km	MPC · JPL
512233	2015 VW_{25}	—	April 29, 2008	Mount Lemmon	Mount Lemmon Survey	·	3.4 km	MPC · JPL
512234	2015 VO_{66}	—	November 8, 2015	Atom Site	Space Surveillance Telescope	ATE · PHA	270 m	MPC · JPL
512235	2015 VT_{100}	—	April 15, 2007	Catalina	CSS	EOS	2.8 km	MPC · JPL
512236	2015 VS_{107}	—	February 26, 2007	Mount Lemmon	Mount Lemmon Survey	·	3.7 km	MPC · JPL
512237	2015 VO_{117}	—	September 18, 2006	Kitt Peak	Spacewatch	·	1.4 km	MPC · JPL
512238	2015 XG_{104}	—	December 8, 2010	Mount Lemmon	Mount Lemmon Survey	·	2.4 km	MPC · JPL
512239	2015 XT_{104}	—	February 3, 2013	Haleakala	Pan-STARRS 1	V	420 m	MPC · JPL
512240	2015 XN_{195}	—	December 6, 2011	Haleakala	Pan-STARRS 1	(5)	1.3 km	MPC · JPL
512241	2015 XP_{195}	—	October 8, 2010	Catalina	CSS	·	2.2 km	MPC · JPL
512242	2015 XZ_{261}	—	December 8, 2015	Haleakala	Pan-STARRS 1	AMO	730 m	MPC · JPL
512243	2015 XZ_{385}	—	July 28, 2009	Kitt Peak	Spacewatch	H	540 m	MPC · JPL
512244	2015 YE_{18}	—	December 31, 2015	Haleakala	Pan-STARRS 1	APO +1km	970 m	MPC · JPL
512245	2016 AU_{8}	—	January 2, 2016	Catalina	CSS	ATE	370 m	MPC · JPL
512246	2016 AW_{53}	—	August 18, 2011	Haleakala	Pan-STARRS 1	L5	10 km	MPC · JPL
512247	2016 BY_{9}	—	January 26, 2012	Mount Lemmon	Mount Lemmon Survey	·	1.0 km	MPC · JPL
512248	2016 BU_{81}	—	January 18, 2016	Haleakala	Pan-STARRS 1	H	430 m	MPC · JPL
512249	2016 BD_{82}	—	August 30, 2011	Haleakala	Pan-STARRS 1	H	410 m	MPC · JPL
512250	2016 CF_{24}	—	September 19, 2009	Mount Lemmon	Mount Lemmon Survey	·	2.5 km	MPC · JPL
512251	2016 CU_{138}	—	August 22, 2014	Haleakala	Pan-STARRS 1	H	450 m	MPC · JPL
512252	2016 CP_{193}	—	April 25, 2011	Mount Lemmon	Mount Lemmon Survey	H	670 m	MPC · JPL
512253	2016 CU_{213}	—	September 22, 2014	Haleakala	Pan-STARRS 1	EOS	1.6 km	MPC · JPL
512254	2016 CM_{265}	—	February 5, 2016	Haleakala	Pan-STARRS 1	H	360 m	MPC · JPL
512255	2016 CC_{268}	—	February 5, 2016	Haleakala	Pan-STARRS 1	H	490 m	MPC · JPL
512256	2016 EK	—	January 9, 2003	Socorro	LINEAR	H	540 m	MPC · JPL
512257	2016 EL_{60}	—	June 10, 2007	Kitt Peak	Spacewatch	·	2.6 km	MPC · JPL
512258	2016 ER_{65}	—	February 9, 2005	Mount Lemmon	Mount Lemmon Survey	·	940 m	MPC · JPL
512259	2016 ED_{122}	—	August 28, 2013	Haleakala	Pan-STARRS 1	PHO	970 m	MPC · JPL
512260	2016 EJ_{124}	—	February 15, 2012	Haleakala	Pan-STARRS 1	·	1.0 km	MPC · JPL
512261	2016 ED_{129}	—	March 11, 2005	Mount Lemmon	Mount Lemmon Survey	·	1.1 km	MPC · JPL
512262	2016 EH_{148}	—	August 31, 2014	Haleakala	Pan-STARRS 1	H	380 m	MPC · JPL
512263	2016 EG_{150}	—	May 8, 2005	Mount Lemmon	Mount Lemmon Survey	·	970 m	MPC · JPL
512264	2016 EW_{178}	—	May 28, 2009	Kitt Peak	Spacewatch	·	960 m	MPC · JPL
512265	2016 EB_{181}	—	April 20, 2009	Mount Lemmon	Mount Lemmon Survey	V	580 m	MPC · JPL
512266	2016 EY_{181}	—	May 7, 2008	Mount Lemmon	Mount Lemmon Survey	·	1.5 km	MPC · JPL
512267	2016 EK_{193}	—	November 1, 2010	Mount Lemmon	Mount Lemmon Survey	·	790 m	MPC · JPL
512268	2016 EN_{200}	—	November 3, 2007	Kitt Peak	Spacewatch	·	720 m	MPC · JPL
512269	2016 EQ_{203}	—	March 10, 2008	Kitt Peak	Spacewatch	H	370 m	MPC · JPL
512270	2016 EQ_{205}	—	April 24, 2006	Kitt Peak	Spacewatch	H	370 m	MPC · JPL
512271	2016 EZ_{206}	—	October 16, 2009	Catalina	CSS	H	400 m	MPC · JPL
512272	2016 FU_{7}	—	March 1, 2011	Mount Lemmon	Mount Lemmon Survey	H	480 m	MPC · JPL
512273	2016 FD_{20}	—	March 15, 2012	Haleakala	Pan-STARRS 1	·	950 m	MPC · JPL
512274	2016 FH_{36}	—	September 30, 2006	Mount Lemmon	Mount Lemmon Survey	V	610 m	MPC · JPL
512275	2016 FK_{41}	—	January 12, 2016	Haleakala	Pan-STARRS 1	H	560 m	MPC · JPL
512276	2016 FU_{53}	—	January 17, 2007	Kitt Peak	Spacewatch	·	1.1 km	MPC · JPL
512277	2016 FA_{61}	—	September 20, 2011	Haleakala	Pan-STARRS 1	H	440 m	MPC · JPL
512278	2016 FC_{61}	—	March 19, 2016	Haleakala	Pan-STARRS 1	H	500 m	MPC · JPL
512279	2016 FK_{61}	—	February 9, 2010	Catalina	CSS	H	600 m	MPC · JPL
512280	2016 FL_{62}	—	September 17, 2006	Anderson Mesa	LONEOS	TIR	3.4 km	MPC · JPL
512281	2016 GN_{21}	—	August 15, 2004	Campo Imperatore	CINEOS	·	540 m	MPC · JPL
512282	2016 GC_{124}	—	March 21, 2015	XuYi	PMO NEO Survey Program	L4	10 km	MPC · JPL
512283	2016 GY_{124}	—	September 12, 2007	Mount Lemmon	Mount Lemmon Survey	·	3.4 km	MPC · JPL
512284	2016 GP_{126}	—	September 23, 2008	Kitt Peak	Spacewatch	(18466)	1.8 km	MPC · JPL
512285	2016 GK_{129}	—	December 30, 2007	Kitt Peak	Spacewatch	·	990 m	MPC · JPL
512286	2016 GX_{133}	—	March 19, 2016	Haleakala	Pan-STARRS 1	·	2.5 km	MPC · JPL
512287	2016 GY_{165}	—	April 11, 2007	Mount Lemmon	Mount Lemmon Survey	·	1.2 km	MPC · JPL
512288	2016 GC_{183}	—	January 10, 2008	Mount Lemmon	Mount Lemmon Survey	·	920 m	MPC · JPL
512289	2016 GJ_{191}	—	March 9, 2007	Kitt Peak	Spacewatch	MAR	890 m	MPC · JPL
512290	2016 GY_{216}	—	December 4, 2007	Mount Lemmon	Mount Lemmon Survey	NYS	1.0 km	MPC · JPL
512291	2016 GJ_{220}	—	February 25, 2011	Mount Lemmon	Mount Lemmon Survey	DOR	2.4 km	MPC · JPL
512292	2016 GH_{221}	—	August 18, 2009	Kitt Peak	Spacewatch	H	450 m	MPC · JPL
512293	2016 GW_{225}	—	April 4, 2005	Catalina	CSS	·	2.4 km	MPC · JPL
512294	2016 GD_{234}	—	October 10, 2004	Kitt Peak	Spacewatch	H	420 m	MPC · JPL
512295	2016 GH_{238}	—	November 29, 2013	Haleakala	Pan-STARRS 1	EUN	1.0 km	MPC · JPL
512296	2016 GT_{241}	—	October 26, 2013	Kitt Peak	Spacewatch	·	1.6 km	MPC · JPL
512297	2016 GM_{242}	—	October 24, 2005	Kitt Peak	Spacewatch	·	1.2 km	MPC · JPL
512298	2016 GS_{246}	—	November 17, 2014	Haleakala	Pan-STARRS 1	·	750 m	MPC · JPL
512299	2016 GJ_{247}	—	November 2, 2000	Kitt Peak	Spacewatch	·	1.6 km	MPC · JPL
512300	2016 GG_{252}	—	June 12, 2011	Mount Lemmon	Mount Lemmon Survey	H	500 m	MPC · JPL

== 512301–512400 ==
back to top

Designation			Discovery			Properties		Ref
Permanent	Provisional	Named after	Date	Site	Discoverer(s)	Category	Diam.	Ref
512301	2016 GZ_{254}	—	January 27, 2011	Mount Lemmon	Mount Lemmon Survey	MIS	2.3 km	MPC · JPL
512302	2016 GS_{255}	—	January 20, 2015	Haleakala	Pan-STARRS 1	TIN	990 m	MPC · JPL
512303	2016 HV	—	March 2, 2009	Mount Lemmon	Mount Lemmon Survey	·	700 m	MPC · JPL
512304	2016 HW	—	October 1, 2013	Kitt Peak	Spacewatch	PAL	1.6 km	MPC · JPL
512305	2016 HG_{3}	—	October 8, 2014	Haleakala	Pan-STARRS 1	H	700 m	MPC · JPL
512306	2016 HA_{15}	—	November 29, 2014	Mount Lemmon	Mount Lemmon Survey	·	700 m	MPC · JPL
512307	2016 HC_{21}	—	August 27, 2006	Kitt Peak	Spacewatch	·	1.0 km	MPC · JPL
512308	2016 HZ_{23}	—	November 10, 2014	Haleakala	Pan-STARRS 1	H	520 m	MPC · JPL
512309	2016 HG_{24}	—	November 28, 2012	Haleakala	Pan-STARRS 1	H	400 m	MPC · JPL
512310	2016 JP_{8}	—	April 24, 2003	Kitt Peak	Spacewatch	·	580 m	MPC · JPL
512311	2016 JS_{10}	—	November 27, 2013	Haleakala	Pan-STARRS 1	·	2.2 km	MPC · JPL
512312	2016 JD_{12}	—	April 22, 2011	Kitt Peak	Spacewatch	H	530 m	MPC · JPL
512313	2016 JU_{14}	—	January 15, 2015	Haleakala	Pan-STARRS 1	·	1.8 km	MPC · JPL
512314	2016 JG_{27}	—	April 5, 2003	Kitt Peak	Spacewatch	·	610 m	MPC · JPL
512315	2016 JP_{27}	—	April 20, 2006	Kitt Peak	Spacewatch	·	890 m	MPC · JPL
512316	2016 JO_{35}	—	May 30, 2009	Mount Lemmon	Mount Lemmon Survey	NYS	720 m	MPC · JPL
512317	2016 JB_{39}	—	December 7, 2012	Kitt Peak	Spacewatch	H	400 m	MPC · JPL
512318	2016 JD_{39}	—	April 13, 2008	Mount Lemmon	Mount Lemmon Survey	H	310 m	MPC · JPL
512319	2016 JU_{39}	—	May 2, 2016	Haleakala	Pan-STARRS 1	·	1.1 km	MPC · JPL
512320	2016 KK	—	September 23, 2014	Haleakala	Pan-STARRS 1	H	450 m	MPC · JPL
512321	2016 KE_{1}	—	June 25, 2011	Haleakala	Pan-STARRS 1	H	500 m	MPC · JPL
512322	2016 KX_{2}	—	June 4, 2005	Kitt Peak	Spacewatch	·	1.2 km	MPC · JPL
512323	2016 KC_{3}	—	April 16, 2005	Catalina	CSS	H	630 m	MPC · JPL
512324	2016 KK_{3}	—	September 29, 2008	Catalina	CSS	·	2.3 km	MPC · JPL
512325	2016 LJ	—	August 14, 2012	Siding Spring	SSS	·	1.4 km	MPC · JPL
512326	2016 LP_{8}	—	November 11, 2009	Kitt Peak	Spacewatch	H	520 m	MPC · JPL
512327	2016 LY_{11}	—	May 30, 2011	Haleakala	Pan-STARRS 1	H	410 m	MPC · JPL
512328	2016 LJ_{12}	—	May 9, 2005	Kitt Peak	Spacewatch	·	3.6 km	MPC · JPL
512329	2016 LU_{13}	—	October 13, 2004	Anderson Mesa	LONEOS	·	1.9 km	MPC · JPL
512330	2016 LJ_{22}	—	February 16, 2015	Haleakala	Pan-STARRS 1	·	1.9 km	MPC · JPL
512331	2016 LX_{25}	—	July 13, 2013	Mount Lemmon	Mount Lemmon Survey	·	470 m	MPC · JPL
512332	2016 LW_{29}	—	November 6, 2013	Haleakala	Pan-STARRS 1	·	1.7 km	MPC · JPL
512333	2016 LC_{41}	—	August 26, 2012	Siding Spring	SSS	·	2.0 km	MPC · JPL
512334	2016 LQ_{45}	—	September 8, 2011	Haleakala	Pan-STARRS 1	·	3.1 km	MPC · JPL
512335	2016 LV_{49}	—	March 14, 2007	Mount Lemmon	Mount Lemmon Survey	MAR	990 m	MPC · JPL
512336	2016 LL_{54}	—	October 1, 2011	Kitt Peak	Spacewatch	LIX	3.4 km	MPC · JPL
512337	2016 LQ_{54}	—	August 20, 2011	Haleakala	Pan-STARRS 1	·	1.4 km	MPC · JPL
512338	2016 LW_{54}	—	October 18, 2011	Haleakala	Pan-STARRS 1	·	2.1 km	MPC · JPL
512339	2016 LB_{56}	—	May 21, 2015	Haleakala	Pan-STARRS 1	·	2.0 km	MPC · JPL
512340	2016 LE_{56}	—	February 27, 2009	Mount Lemmon	Mount Lemmon Survey	·	2.9 km	MPC · JPL
512341	2016 LF_{56}	—	September 25, 2006	Mount Lemmon	Mount Lemmon Survey	EOS	1.5 km	MPC · JPL
512342	2016 MR	—	December 22, 2012	Haleakala	Pan-STARRS 1	·	2.8 km	MPC · JPL
512343	2016 ML_{2}	—	April 24, 2003	Kitt Peak	Spacewatch	·	730 m	MPC · JPL
512344	2016 MC_{3}	—	November 27, 2006	Mount Lemmon	Mount Lemmon Survey	H	620 m	MPC · JPL
512345	2016 MD_{3}	—	May 14, 2005	Kitt Peak	Spacewatch	·	3.0 km	MPC · JPL
512346	2016 NW_{1}	—	March 6, 2008	Mount Lemmon	Mount Lemmon Survey	V	770 m	MPC · JPL
512347	2016 NE_{2}	—	October 20, 2014	Mount Lemmon	Mount Lemmon Survey	·	1.9 km	MPC · JPL
512348	2016 NG_{2}	—	October 24, 2011	Haleakala	Pan-STARRS 1	H	500 m	MPC · JPL
512349	2016 NR_{5}	—	April 2, 2011	Mount Lemmon	Mount Lemmon Survey	·	2.1 km	MPC · JPL
512350	2016 NK_{7}	—	October 19, 2006	Mount Lemmon	Mount Lemmon Survey	·	1.6 km	MPC · JPL
512351	2016 NK_{18}	—	December 30, 2005	Kitt Peak	Spacewatch	·	1.2 km	MPC · JPL
512352	2016 NS_{18}	—	October 31, 2010	Kitt Peak	Spacewatch	PHO	880 m	MPC · JPL
512353	2016 NC_{20}	—	November 14, 2013	Mount Lemmon	Mount Lemmon Survey	·	1.7 km	MPC · JPL
512354	2016 NS_{20}	—	January 3, 2009	Kitt Peak	Spacewatch	EOS	1.8 km	MPC · JPL
512355	2016 NO_{22}	—	December 18, 2001	Socorro	LINEAR	H	510 m	MPC · JPL
512356	2016 NU_{27}	—	March 29, 2015	Haleakala	Pan-STARRS 1	·	1.2 km	MPC · JPL
512357	2016 NT_{29}	—	January 12, 2013	Mount Lemmon	Mount Lemmon Survey	·	3.2 km	MPC · JPL
512358	2016 NH_{30}	—	December 19, 2004	Mount Lemmon	Mount Lemmon Survey	·	1.7 km	MPC · JPL
512359	2016 NU_{33}	—	September 13, 2007	Catalina	CSS	·	2.7 km	MPC · JPL
512360	2016 NA_{39}	—	December 10, 2009	Mount Lemmon	Mount Lemmon Survey	MAS	960 m	MPC · JPL
512361	2016 NY_{45}	—	August 19, 2012	Siding Spring	SSS	HNS	1.2 km	MPC · JPL
512362	2016 NV_{47}	—	December 27, 2006	Mount Lemmon	Mount Lemmon Survey	·	1.5 km	MPC · JPL
512363	2016 ND_{49}	—	October 26, 2012	Mount Lemmon	Mount Lemmon Survey	·	1.4 km	MPC · JPL
512364	2016 NW_{49}	—	December 10, 2010	Mount Lemmon	Mount Lemmon Survey	·	780 m	MPC · JPL
512365	2016 NV_{53}	—	January 23, 2006	Catalina	CSS	·	2.5 km	MPC · JPL
512366	2016 NW_{53}	—	October 10, 2012	Haleakala	Pan-STARRS 1	MAR	1.0 km	MPC · JPL
512367	2016 NA_{54}	—	May 20, 2015	Haleakala	Pan-STARRS 1	·	2.2 km	MPC · JPL
512368	2016 NV_{54}	—	October 28, 2013	Mount Lemmon	Mount Lemmon Survey	·	600 m	MPC · JPL
512369	2016 NS_{56}	—	January 8, 2010	Kitt Peak	Spacewatch	H	490 m	MPC · JPL
512370	2016 NV_{56}	—	November 23, 2014	Haleakala	Pan-STARRS 1	H	520 m	MPC · JPL
512371	2016 NE_{57}	—	July 25, 2008	Mount Lemmon	Mount Lemmon Survey	H	540 m	MPC · JPL
512372	2016 NZ_{58}	—	December 3, 2013	Mount Lemmon	Mount Lemmon Survey	·	1.0 km	MPC · JPL
512373	2016 NG_{60}	—	November 20, 2000	Socorro	LINEAR	·	1.4 km	MPC · JPL
512374	2016 NN_{60}	—	September 21, 2011	Mount Lemmon	Mount Lemmon Survey	·	1.5 km	MPC · JPL
512375	2016 NP_{61}	—	September 29, 2005	Catalina	CSS	·	3.0 km	MPC · JPL
512376	2016 NB_{63}	—	October 2, 2008	Mount Lemmon	Mount Lemmon Survey	·	1.0 km	MPC · JPL
512377	2016 NF_{63}	—	September 21, 2011	Kitt Peak	Spacewatch	·	2.1 km	MPC · JPL
512378	2016 NQ_{64}	—	October 27, 2005	Mount Lemmon	Mount Lemmon Survey	THM	2.0 km	MPC · JPL
512379	2016 NC_{65}	—	October 8, 2012	Haleakala	Pan-STARRS 1	·	1.9 km	MPC · JPL
512380	2016 NH_{65}	—	December 18, 2004	Mount Lemmon	Mount Lemmon Survey	·	1.3 km	MPC · JPL
512381	2016 NM_{65}	—	April 4, 2005	Mount Lemmon	Mount Lemmon Survey	·	2.1 km	MPC · JPL
512382	2016 NN_{65}	—	October 17, 2012	Mount Lemmon	Mount Lemmon Survey	615	1.5 km	MPC · JPL
512383	2016 NP_{65}	—	October 20, 2003	Kitt Peak	Spacewatch	(21344)	1.6 km	MPC · JPL
512384	2016 NR_{65}	—	September 14, 2007	Mount Lemmon	Mount Lemmon Survey	·	2.3 km	MPC · JPL
512385	2016 NC_{66}	—	May 18, 2015	Mount Lemmon	Mount Lemmon Survey	·	2.2 km	MPC · JPL
512386	2016 ND_{66}	—	October 2, 2013	Kitt Peak	Spacewatch	·	560 m	MPC · JPL
512387	2016 NG_{66}	—	January 27, 2006	Mount Lemmon	Mount Lemmon Survey	·	1.7 km	MPC · JPL
512388	2016 OB	—	August 13, 2009	Siding Spring	SSS	PHO	1.1 km	MPC · JPL
512389	2016 OG_{1}	—	October 5, 2014	Haleakala	Pan-STARRS 1	H	580 m	MPC · JPL
512390	2016 OC_{2}	—	June 8, 2016	Mount Lemmon	Mount Lemmon Survey	·	3.8 km	MPC · JPL
512391	2016 OF_{3}	—	October 25, 2008	Catalina	CSS	MAR	990 m	MPC · JPL
512392	2016 OS_{3}	—	October 28, 2005	Catalina	CSS	·	1.4 km	MPC · JPL
512393	2016 OE_{4}	—	October 15, 2007	Kitt Peak	Spacewatch	·	1.7 km	MPC · JPL
512394	2016 OA_{6}	—	January 3, 2013	Haleakala	Pan-STARRS 1	GAL	1.5 km	MPC · JPL
512395	2016 OK_{6}	—	September 15, 2007	Mount Lemmon	Mount Lemmon Survey	·	2.3 km	MPC · JPL
512396	2016 OL_{6}	—	November 19, 2003	Anderson Mesa	LONEOS	·	2.2 km	MPC · JPL
512397	2016 PD_{4}	—	April 10, 2015	Haleakala	Pan-STARRS 1	·	1.4 km	MPC · JPL
512398	2016 PE_{25}	—	October 7, 2008	Mount Lemmon	Mount Lemmon Survey	(5)	1.1 km	MPC · JPL
512399	2016 PL_{31}	—	May 21, 2015	Haleakala	Pan-STARRS 1	EOS	1.5 km	MPC · JPL
512400	2016 PS_{50}	—	November 14, 2012	Mount Lemmon	Mount Lemmon Survey	·	1.6 km	MPC · JPL

== 512401–512500 ==
back to top

Designation			Discovery			Properties		Ref
Permanent	Provisional	Named after	Date	Site	Discoverer(s)	Category	Diam.	Ref
512401	2016 PA_{53}	—	March 25, 2015	Haleakala	Pan-STARRS 1	·	2.8 km	MPC · JPL
512402	2016 PC_{60}	—	December 6, 2012	Mount Lemmon	Mount Lemmon Survey	DOR	2.0 km	MPC · JPL
512403	2016 PC_{61}	—	May 21, 2015	Haleakala	Pan-STARRS 1	·	1.2 km	MPC · JPL
512404	2016 PS_{61}	—	April 7, 2006	Kitt Peak	Spacewatch	WIT	810 m	MPC · JPL
512405	2016 PM_{67}	—	October 1, 2005	Catalina	CSS	TIR	2.5 km	MPC · JPL
512406	2016 PE_{68}	—	August 16, 2012	Haleakala	Pan-STARRS 1	·	1.4 km	MPC · JPL
512407	2016 PR_{71}	—	October 20, 2006	Mount Lemmon	Mount Lemmon Survey	·	1.1 km	MPC · JPL
512408	2016 PE_{72}	—	September 28, 2006	Kitt Peak	Spacewatch	·	2.4 km	MPC · JPL
512409	2016 PK_{72}	—	April 10, 2010	Mount Lemmon	Mount Lemmon Survey	·	2.3 km	MPC · JPL
512410	2016 PA_{75}	—	August 19, 2006	Kitt Peak	Spacewatch	KOR	1.6 km	MPC · JPL
512411	2016 PX_{75}	—	October 7, 2007	Catalina	CSS	EUN	4.1 km	MPC · JPL
512412	2016 PL_{77}	—	July 10, 2007	Siding Spring	SSS	·	2.1 km	MPC · JPL
512413	2016 PY_{77}	—	January 27, 2007	Kitt Peak	Spacewatch	·	1.5 km	MPC · JPL
512414	2016 PY_{81}	—	April 29, 2010	WISE	WISE	T_{j} (2.98) · EUP	2.7 km	MPC · JPL
512415	2016 PK_{83}	—	September 8, 2007	Anderson Mesa	LONEOS	·	1.7 km	MPC · JPL
512416	2016 PM_{83}	—	October 12, 2005	Kitt Peak	Spacewatch	·	2.3 km	MPC · JPL
512417	2016 PF_{86}	—	September 14, 2012	Catalina	CSS	EUN	1.2 km	MPC · JPL
512418	2016 PV_{86}	—	May 9, 2010	WISE	WISE	EUP	3.8 km	MPC · JPL
512419	2016 PZ_{88}	—	October 8, 2007	Mount Lemmon	Mount Lemmon Survey	·	1.3 km	MPC · JPL
512420	2016 PC_{89}	—	November 6, 2012	Kitt Peak	Spacewatch	·	1.7 km	MPC · JPL
512421	2016 PE_{89}	—	March 3, 2009	Mount Lemmon	Mount Lemmon Survey	HOF	2.3 km	MPC · JPL
512422	2016 PF_{89}	—	September 25, 2007	Mount Lemmon	Mount Lemmon Survey	·	1.6 km	MPC · JPL
512423	2016 PG_{89}	—	October 10, 2007	Mount Lemmon	Mount Lemmon Survey	·	2.3 km	MPC · JPL
512424	2016 PK_{89}	—	October 20, 2012	Catalina	CSS	·	2.0 km	MPC · JPL
512425	2016 PO_{89}	—	September 12, 2007	Mount Lemmon	Mount Lemmon Survey	·	1.8 km	MPC · JPL
512426	2016 PR_{89}	—	February 9, 2005	Anderson Mesa	LONEOS	·	5.0 km	MPC · JPL
512427	2016 PS_{89}	—	February 26, 2014	Mount Lemmon	Mount Lemmon Survey	EUN	990 m	MPC · JPL
512428	2016 PY_{89}	—	October 1, 2005	Mount Lemmon	Mount Lemmon Survey	·	2.8 km	MPC · JPL
512429	2016 PB_{90}	—	October 1, 2005	Mount Lemmon	Mount Lemmon Survey	VER	2.3 km	MPC · JPL
512430	2016 PF_{90}	—	September 23, 2005	Catalina	CSS	·	1.1 km	MPC · JPL
512431	2016 PK_{90}	—	April 23, 2010	WISE	WISE	·	3.3 km	MPC · JPL
512432	2016 PU_{90}	—	May 2, 2006	Mount Lemmon	Mount Lemmon Survey	·	2.2 km	MPC · JPL
512433	2016 PW_{90}	—	March 16, 2010	Mount Lemmon	Mount Lemmon Survey	(5)	1.2 km	MPC · JPL
512434	2016 PX_{90}	—	March 24, 2006	Mount Lemmon	Mount Lemmon Survey	·	1.3 km	MPC · JPL
512435	2016 PE_{91}	—	November 12, 2012	Mount Lemmon	Mount Lemmon Survey	·	1.6 km	MPC · JPL
512436	2016 PF_{91}	—	May 3, 2006	Mount Lemmon	Mount Lemmon Survey	·	1.5 km	MPC · JPL
512437	2016 PG_{91}	—	February 25, 2006	Mount Lemmon	Mount Lemmon Survey	MAR	1.1 km	MPC · JPL
512438	2016 QT	—	August 10, 2007	Kitt Peak	Spacewatch	·	1.3 km	MPC · JPL
512439	2016 QJ_{3}	—	March 1, 2008	Kitt Peak	Spacewatch	NYS	1.0 km	MPC · JPL
512440	2016 QC_{6}	—	April 18, 2015	Haleakala	Pan-STARRS 1	GEF	1.1 km	MPC · JPL
512441	2016 QV_{11}	—	September 26, 2005	Catalina	CSS	·	2.8 km	MPC · JPL
512442	2016 QA_{13}	—	April 9, 2010	Mount Lemmon	Mount Lemmon Survey	·	2.3 km	MPC · JPL
512443	2016 QV_{14}	—	September 18, 2006	Kitt Peak	Spacewatch	·	1.9 km	MPC · JPL
512444	2016 QW_{14}	—	July 22, 2006	Mount Lemmon	Mount Lemmon Survey	·	620 m	MPC · JPL
512445	2016 QX_{16}	—	August 24, 2011	Haleakala	Pan-STARRS 1	·	1.8 km	MPC · JPL
512446	2016 QK_{20}	—	February 26, 2014	Haleakala	Pan-STARRS 1	BRA	1.4 km	MPC · JPL
512447	2016 QG_{21}	—	September 27, 2011	Mount Lemmon	Mount Lemmon Survey	·	3.3 km	MPC · JPL
512448	2016 QF_{22}	—	December 10, 2005	Kitt Peak	Spacewatch	·	1.4 km	MPC · JPL
512449	2016 QS_{23}	—	November 2, 2011	Mount Lemmon	Mount Lemmon Survey	LIX	3.2 km	MPC · JPL
512450	2016 QN_{24}	—	September 25, 2007	Mount Lemmon	Mount Lemmon Survey	·	2.3 km	MPC · JPL
512451	2016 QB_{25}	—	March 28, 2014	Mount Lemmon	Mount Lemmon Survey	·	2.1 km	MPC · JPL
512452	2016 QG_{26}	—	October 23, 2003	Kitt Peak	Spacewatch	·	2.0 km	MPC · JPL
512453	2016 QE_{27}	—	October 30, 2009	Mount Lemmon	Mount Lemmon Survey	V	730 m	MPC · JPL
512454	2016 QM_{29}	—	December 15, 2006	Kitt Peak	Spacewatch	·	1.0 km	MPC · JPL
512455	2016 QE_{33}	—	December 30, 2007	Kitt Peak	Spacewatch	·	1.9 km	MPC · JPL
512456	2016 QL_{36}	—	August 29, 2005	Kitt Peak	Spacewatch	MAS	790 m	MPC · JPL
512457	2016 QE_{40}	—	November 7, 2012	Mount Lemmon	Mount Lemmon Survey	AEO	1.1 km	MPC · JPL
512458	2016 QW_{40}	—	September 18, 2003	Kitt Peak	Spacewatch	·	2.0 km	MPC · JPL
512459	2016 QQ_{45}	—	October 7, 2008	Mount Lemmon	Mount Lemmon Survey	(5)	1.1 km	MPC · JPL
512460	2016 QJ_{46}	—	December 28, 2013	Kitt Peak	Spacewatch	·	2.3 km	MPC · JPL
512461	2016 QO_{46}	—	March 30, 2015	Haleakala	Pan-STARRS 1	·	1.2 km	MPC · JPL
512462	2016 QQ_{46}	—	May 24, 2006	Kitt Peak	Spacewatch	·	2.1 km	MPC · JPL
512463	2016 QB_{47}	—	March 25, 2015	Haleakala	Pan-STARRS 1	·	700 m	MPC · JPL
512464	2016 QR_{47}	—	October 28, 2008	Kitt Peak	Spacewatch	·	1.2 km	MPC · JPL
512465	2016 QD_{48}	—	April 12, 2010	Mount Lemmon	Mount Lemmon Survey	WIT	900 m	MPC · JPL
512466	2016 QW_{52}	—	October 8, 2012	Haleakala	Pan-STARRS 1	·	1.4 km	MPC · JPL
512467	2016 QJ_{53}	—	October 7, 2012	Haleakala	Pan-STARRS 1	(5)	1.2 km	MPC · JPL
512468	2016 QP_{53}	—	February 10, 2011	Mount Lemmon	Mount Lemmon Survey	·	1.2 km	MPC · JPL
512469	2016 QV_{53}	—	March 12, 2005	Kitt Peak	Spacewatch	BRA	1.1 km	MPC · JPL
512470	2016 QX_{53}	—	October 23, 2009	Mount Lemmon	Mount Lemmon Survey	·	1.3 km	MPC · JPL
512471	2016 QK_{55}	—	June 24, 2007	Kitt Peak	Spacewatch	·	1.6 km	MPC · JPL
512472	2016 QL_{56}	—	September 2, 2013	Mount Lemmon	Mount Lemmon Survey	·	730 m	MPC · JPL
512473	2016 QB_{57}	—	January 6, 2010	Kitt Peak	Spacewatch	EUN	1.2 km	MPC · JPL
512474	2016 QU_{59}	—	May 25, 2006	Mount Lemmon	Mount Lemmon Survey	·	2.4 km	MPC · JPL
512475	2016 QX_{59}	—	September 18, 2009	Kitt Peak	Spacewatch	V	570 m	MPC · JPL
512476	2016 QP_{61}	—	September 26, 2006	Kitt Peak	Spacewatch	·	2.1 km	MPC · JPL
512477	2016 QV_{61}	—	February 9, 2010	WISE	WISE	PHO	2.3 km	MPC · JPL
512478	2016 QW_{70}	—	September 25, 2005	Kitt Peak	Spacewatch	TIR	2.2 km	MPC · JPL
512479	2016 QP_{72}	—	September 19, 2012	Mount Lemmon	Mount Lemmon Survey	·	1.4 km	MPC · JPL
512480	2016 QW_{74}	—	July 30, 2005	Siding Spring	SSS	·	3.0 km	MPC · JPL
512481	2016 QM_{76}	—	June 15, 2015	Haleakala	Pan-STARRS 1	·	1.5 km	MPC · JPL
512482	2016 QP_{76}	—	February 15, 2015	Haleakala	Pan-STARRS 1	·	750 m	MPC · JPL
512483	2016 QO_{77}	—	October 9, 2012	Haleakala	Pan-STARRS 1	·	1.6 km	MPC · JPL
512484	2016 QT_{77}	—	September 5, 2007	Anderson Mesa	LONEOS	·	1.9 km	MPC · JPL
512485	2016 QV_{77}	—	October 29, 2006	Catalina	CSS	·	2.6 km	MPC · JPL
512486	2016 QD_{78}	—	June 14, 2005	Mount Lemmon	Mount Lemmon Survey	EOS	2.3 km	MPC · JPL
512487	2016 QR_{82}	—	September 8, 2011	Kitt Peak	Spacewatch	·	1.9 km	MPC · JPL
512488	2016 QL_{83}	—	November 1, 2005	Mount Lemmon	Mount Lemmon Survey	NYS	1.1 km	MPC · JPL
512489	2016 QM_{83}	—	November 18, 2009	Kitt Peak	Spacewatch	NYS	980 m	MPC · JPL
512490	2016 QO_{84}	—	September 30, 2003	Kitt Peak	Spacewatch	·	810 m	MPC · JPL
512491	2016 QV_{87}	—	October 27, 2005	Anderson Mesa	LONEOS	·	4.8 km	MPC · JPL
512492	2016 QX_{87}	—	November 5, 2007	Mount Lemmon	Mount Lemmon Survey	EOS	2.1 km	MPC · JPL
512493	2016 QB_{88}	—	April 12, 2015	Haleakala	Pan-STARRS 1	MAR	690 m	MPC · JPL
512494	2016 QD_{88}	—	November 24, 2006	Mount Lemmon	Mount Lemmon Survey	·	1.8 km	MPC · JPL
512495	2016 RC	—	June 26, 2006	Siding Spring	SSS	·	750 m	MPC · JPL
512496	2016 RN_{2}	—	November 18, 2006	Kitt Peak	Spacewatch	·	2.0 km	MPC · JPL
512497	2016 RS_{2}	—	April 8, 2008	Mount Lemmon	Mount Lemmon Survey	NYS	910 m	MPC · JPL
512498	2016 RM_{3}	—	October 23, 2003	Kitt Peak	Spacewatch	·	2.1 km	MPC · JPL
512499	2016 RE_{4}	—	June 14, 2004	Kitt Peak	Spacewatch	·	2.8 km	MPC · JPL
512500	2016 RE_{6}	—	May 21, 2010	WISE	WISE	·	3.3 km	MPC · JPL

== 512501–512600 ==
back to top

Designation			Discovery			Properties		Ref
Permanent	Provisional	Named after	Date	Site	Discoverer(s)	Category	Diam.	Ref
512501	2016 RR_{6}	—	September 16, 2009	Mount Lemmon	Mount Lemmon Survey	·	1.0 km	MPC · JPL
512502	2016 RS_{6}	—	September 26, 2011	Haleakala	Pan-STARRS 1	·	2.1 km	MPC · JPL
512503	2016 RW_{9}	—	September 17, 2006	Kitt Peak	Spacewatch	·	1.5 km	MPC · JPL
512504	2016 RP_{11}	—	September 29, 2008	Catalina	CSS	KON	2.3 km	MPC · JPL
512505	2016 RJ_{13}	—	July 3, 2005	Mount Lemmon	Mount Lemmon Survey	·	3.0 km	MPC · JPL
512506	2016 RR_{14}	—	September 16, 2009	Mount Lemmon	Mount Lemmon Survey	·	1.0 km	MPC · JPL
512507	2016 RE_{21}	—	October 27, 2009	Mount Lemmon	Mount Lemmon Survey	V	610 m	MPC · JPL
512508	2016 RQ_{23}	—	May 17, 2009	Mount Lemmon	Mount Lemmon Survey	·	3.2 km	MPC · JPL
512509	2016 RT_{23}	—	September 15, 2012	Catalina	CSS	·	1.4 km	MPC · JPL
512510	2016 RJ_{24}	—	May 6, 2006	Kitt Peak	Spacewatch	·	2.0 km	MPC · JPL
512511	2016 RU_{24}	—	October 23, 2005	Catalina	CSS	LIX	3.2 km	MPC · JPL
512512	2016 RN_{25}	—	October 23, 2003	Kitt Peak	Spacewatch	·	760 m	MPC · JPL
512513	2016 RT_{25}	—	November 3, 2007	Kitt Peak	Spacewatch	NAE	1.6 km	MPC · JPL
512514	2016 RX_{26}	—	April 13, 2015	Haleakala	Pan-STARRS 1	JUN	990 m	MPC · JPL
512515	2016 RZ_{26}	—	August 25, 2000	Socorro	LINEAR	·	2.8 km	MPC · JPL
512516	2016 RF_{27}	—	March 14, 2011	Mount Lemmon	Mount Lemmon Survey	NYS	1.2 km	MPC · JPL
512517	2016 RN_{31}	—	December 28, 2013	Kitt Peak	Spacewatch	PHO	920 m	MPC · JPL
512518	2016 RO_{31}	—	December 3, 2012	Mount Lemmon	Mount Lemmon Survey	·	2.2 km	MPC · JPL
512519	2016 RV_{31}	—	April 12, 2005	Mount Lemmon	Mount Lemmon Survey	·	1.6 km	MPC · JPL
512520	2016 RF_{32}	—	November 1, 2007	Kitt Peak	Spacewatch	KOR	1.3 km	MPC · JPL
512521	2016 RL_{32}	—	August 29, 2005	Kitt Peak	Spacewatch	·	2.8 km	MPC · JPL
512522	2016 RZ_{34}	—	March 7, 2014	Mount Lemmon	Mount Lemmon Survey	·	1.5 km	MPC · JPL
512523	2016 RA_{35}	—	September 29, 2011	Mount Lemmon	Mount Lemmon Survey	·	1.7 km	MPC · JPL
512524	2016 RF_{35}	—	December 19, 2004	Mount Lemmon	Mount Lemmon Survey	·	1.8 km	MPC · JPL
512525	2016 RM_{35}	—	August 13, 2012	Siding Spring	SSS	·	1.3 km	MPC · JPL
512526	2016 RP_{35}	—	September 16, 2009	Kitt Peak	Spacewatch	V	540 m	MPC · JPL
512527	2016 RQ_{36}	—	December 19, 2007	Kitt Peak	Spacewatch	·	2.1 km	MPC · JPL
512528	2016 RL_{37}	—	April 3, 2008	Mount Lemmon	Mount Lemmon Survey	·	910 m	MPC · JPL
512529	2016 RE_{42}	—	September 10, 2007	Kitt Peak	Spacewatch	·	1.6 km	MPC · JPL
512530	2016 RN_{43}	—	May 19, 2010	WISE	WISE	·	3.2 km	MPC · JPL
512531	2016 RQ_{43}	—	April 18, 2009	Catalina	CSS	·	3.0 km	MPC · JPL
512532	2016 RW_{44}	—	March 9, 2005	Mount Lemmon	Mount Lemmon Survey	AST	1.8 km	MPC · JPL
512533	2016 RX_{44}	—	October 22, 2012	Haleakala	Pan-STARRS 1	·	1.4 km	MPC · JPL
512534	2016 RY_{44}	—	December 15, 2006	Kitt Peak	Spacewatch	·	2.7 km	MPC · JPL
512535	2016 RA_{45}	—	June 22, 2015	Haleakala	Pan-STARRS 1	·	1.6 km	MPC · JPL
512536	2016 SN_{4}	—	October 5, 2005	Catalina	CSS	·	3.5 km	MPC · JPL
512537	2016 SY_{4}	—	November 14, 2006	Kitt Peak	Spacewatch	·	3.5 km	MPC · JPL
512538	2016 SC_{7}	—	December 15, 2006	Mount Lemmon	Mount Lemmon Survey	·	2.6 km	MPC · JPL
512539	2016 SU_{7}	—	February 15, 2010	Mount Lemmon	Mount Lemmon Survey	EUN	1.2 km	MPC · JPL
512540	2016 SZ_{7}	—	January 27, 2006	Mount Lemmon	Mount Lemmon Survey	MAR	920 m	MPC · JPL
512541	2016 SF_{8}	—	February 14, 2005	Catalina	CSS	ADE	2.6 km	MPC · JPL
512542	2016 SK_{8}	—	May 16, 2010	WISE	WISE	·	4.6 km	MPC · JPL
512543	2016 SN_{8}	—	November 21, 2006	Mount Lemmon	Mount Lemmon Survey	·	3.1 km	MPC · JPL
512544	2016 SE_{9}	—	September 12, 2007	Catalina	CSS	·	2.2 km	MPC · JPL
512545	2016 SG_{10}	—	January 18, 2008	Kitt Peak	Spacewatch	·	1.6 km	MPC · JPL
512546	2016 SH_{10}	—	January 17, 2005	Kitt Peak	Spacewatch	·	1.3 km	MPC · JPL
512547	2016 SK_{10}	—	August 27, 2006	Kitt Peak	Spacewatch	KOR	1.8 km	MPC · JPL
512548	2016 SS_{10}	—	September 1, 2005	Kitt Peak	Spacewatch	·	1.9 km	MPC · JPL
512549	2016 SO_{11}	—	January 21, 2002	Socorro	LINEAR	·	2.4 km	MPC · JPL
512550	2016 SR_{12}	—	June 18, 2005	Mount Lemmon	Mount Lemmon Survey	V	600 m	MPC · JPL
512551	2016 SH_{14}	—	March 8, 2005	Mount Lemmon	Mount Lemmon Survey	·	660 m	MPC · JPL
512552	2016 SU_{14}	—	October 4, 2007	Kitt Peak	Spacewatch	·	1.9 km	MPC · JPL
512553	2016 SK_{17}	—	September 5, 2007	Catalina	CSS	·	1.6 km	MPC · JPL
512554	2016 SW_{18}	—	February 8, 2008	Mount Lemmon	Mount Lemmon Survey	·	2.5 km	MPC · JPL
512555	2016 SK_{19}	—	February 28, 2008	Mount Lemmon	Mount Lemmon Survey	·	800 m	MPC · JPL
512556	2016 SR_{19}	—	October 14, 2001	Kitt Peak	Spacewatch	MAS	990 m	MPC · JPL
512557	2016 ST_{19}	—	July 21, 2006	Mount Lemmon	Mount Lemmon Survey	·	2.0 km	MPC · JPL
512558	2016 SV_{19}	—	September 10, 2007	Kitt Peak	Spacewatch	NEM	2.1 km	MPC · JPL
512559	2016 SW_{20}	—	May 8, 2014	Haleakala	Pan-STARRS 1	·	3.0 km	MPC · JPL
512560	2016 SA_{21}	—	September 27, 2011	Mount Lemmon	Mount Lemmon Survey	·	2.1 km	MPC · JPL
512561	2016 SN_{21}	—	January 1, 2009	Kitt Peak	Spacewatch	·	2.3 km	MPC · JPL
512562	2016 SM_{22}	—	November 1, 2008	Kitt Peak	Spacewatch	·	1.3 km	MPC · JPL
512563	2016 SR_{23}	—	July 1, 2005	Kitt Peak	Spacewatch	·	740 m	MPC · JPL
512564	2016 SH_{24}	—	August 27, 2011	Haleakala	Pan-STARRS 1	·	1.6 km	MPC · JPL
512565	2016 SQ_{24}	—	December 1, 2006	Mount Lemmon	Mount Lemmon Survey	·	3.2 km	MPC · JPL
512566	2016 ST_{24}	—	February 10, 2008	Mount Lemmon	Mount Lemmon Survey	(1298)	2.7 km	MPC · JPL
512567	2016 SD_{25}	—	February 5, 2009	Kitt Peak	Spacewatch	AGN	1.4 km	MPC · JPL
512568	2016 SU_{25}	—	October 12, 2007	Kitt Peak	Spacewatch	·	930 m	MPC · JPL
512569	2016 SN_{28}	—	March 18, 2013	Mount Lemmon	Mount Lemmon Survey	CYB	4.1 km	MPC · JPL
512570	2016 SY_{28}	—	April 27, 2000	Kitt Peak	Spacewatch	·	1.2 km	MPC · JPL
512571	2016 SD_{31}	—	May 1, 2003	Kitt Peak	Spacewatch	·	3.1 km	MPC · JPL
512572	2016 SJ_{31}	—	September 30, 1998	Kitt Peak	Spacewatch	·	1.3 km	MPC · JPL
512573	2016 SH_{32}	—	May 3, 2008	Mount Lemmon	Mount Lemmon Survey	·	3.7 km	MPC · JPL
512574	2016 SX_{32}	—	October 8, 2012	Haleakala	Pan-STARRS 1	·	1.2 km	MPC · JPL
512575	2016 SC_{34}	—	February 7, 2008	Mount Lemmon	Mount Lemmon Survey	·	2.5 km	MPC · JPL
512576	2016 SP_{35}	—	September 6, 2004	Socorro	LINEAR	·	1.7 km	MPC · JPL
512577	2016 SD_{37}	—	February 10, 2008	Kitt Peak	Spacewatch	EOS	1.9 km	MPC · JPL
512578	2016 SH_{37}	—	September 30, 2005	Mount Lemmon	Mount Lemmon Survey	·	3.2 km	MPC · JPL
512579	2016 ST_{38}	—	September 12, 2007	Mount Lemmon	Mount Lemmon Survey	·	1.5 km	MPC · JPL
512580	2016 SL_{39}	—	March 15, 2004	Kitt Peak	Spacewatch	·	1.5 km	MPC · JPL
512581	2016 SE_{40}	—	August 31, 2005	Kitt Peak	Spacewatch	MAS	630 m	MPC · JPL
512582	2016 SJ_{40}	—	October 9, 2007	Kitt Peak	Spacewatch	·	1.6 km	MPC · JPL
512583	2016 SO_{40}	—	April 10, 2010	Kitt Peak	Spacewatch	·	1.6 km	MPC · JPL
512584	2016 SA_{41}	—	July 31, 2009	Kitt Peak	Spacewatch	·	680 m	MPC · JPL
512585	2016 SY_{41}	—	October 27, 2003	Kitt Peak	Spacewatch	·	1.7 km	MPC · JPL
512586	2016 SM_{42}	—	February 16, 2010	Kitt Peak	Spacewatch	·	1.2 km	MPC · JPL
512587	2016 SU_{45}	—	October 30, 2005	Kitt Peak	Spacewatch	·	1.1 km	MPC · JPL
512588	2016 SB_{47}	—	September 28, 2003	Kitt Peak	Spacewatch	·	1.7 km	MPC · JPL
512589	2016 SX_{48}	—	March 10, 2014	Mount Lemmon	Mount Lemmon Survey	EUN	1.0 km	MPC · JPL
512590	2016 SZ_{48}	—	June 11, 2004	Kitt Peak	Spacewatch	·	4.4 km	MPC · JPL
512591	2016 SA_{49}	—	August 27, 2005	Siding Spring	SSS	·	4.0 km	MPC · JPL
512592	2016 SB_{49}	—	February 21, 2009	Kitt Peak	Spacewatch	HOF	2.4 km	MPC · JPL
512593	2016 SD_{49}	—	September 22, 2016	Haleakala	Pan-STARRS 1	HNS	1.4 km	MPC · JPL
512594	2016 SE_{49}	—	October 17, 2007	Anderson Mesa	LONEOS	·	2.0 km	MPC · JPL
512595	2016 TL_{1}	—	June 19, 2010	Mount Lemmon	Mount Lemmon Survey	·	3.1 km	MPC · JPL
512596	2016 TW_{1}	—	April 4, 2014	Mount Lemmon	Mount Lemmon Survey	·	2.3 km	MPC · JPL
512597	2016 TG_{3}	—	April 4, 2014	Haleakala	Pan-STARRS 1	·	3.4 km	MPC · JPL
512598	2016 TX_{4}	—	January 17, 2008	Mount Lemmon	Mount Lemmon Survey	·	1.8 km	MPC · JPL
512599	2016 TS_{5}	—	January 30, 2011	Mount Lemmon	Mount Lemmon Survey	PHO	1.3 km	MPC · JPL
512600	2016 TD_{7}	—	September 17, 2010	Mount Lemmon	Mount Lemmon Survey	URS	2.8 km	MPC · JPL

== 512601–512700 ==
back to top

Designation			Discovery			Properties		Ref
Permanent	Provisional	Named after	Date	Site	Discoverer(s)	Category	Diam.	Ref
512601	2016 TU_{7}	—	October 11, 2005	Kitt Peak	Spacewatch	·	2.4 km	MPC · JPL
512602	2016 TZ_{8}	—	December 29, 2008	Kitt Peak	Spacewatch	·	1.7 km	MPC · JPL
512603	2016 TM_{9}	—	August 27, 2006	Kitt Peak	Spacewatch	·	1.9 km	MPC · JPL
512604	2016 TB_{14}	—	October 24, 2011	Haleakala	Pan-STARRS 1	·	4.2 km	MPC · JPL
512605	2016 TJ_{15}	—	March 31, 2008	Mount Lemmon	Mount Lemmon Survey	VER	2.5 km	MPC · JPL
512606	2016 TM_{15}	—	December 1, 2000	Kitt Peak	Spacewatch	·	1.2 km	MPC · JPL
512607	2016 TN_{15}	—	January 27, 2007	Mount Lemmon	Mount Lemmon Survey	VER	2.9 km	MPC · JPL
512608	2016 TR_{15}	—	March 26, 2011	Mount Lemmon	Mount Lemmon Survey	·	1.5 km	MPC · JPL
512609	2016 TT_{15}	—	September 6, 2016	Mount Lemmon	Mount Lemmon Survey	·	2.6 km	MPC · JPL
512610	2016 TH_{16}	—	December 13, 2012	Mount Lemmon	Mount Lemmon Survey	·	1.8 km	MPC · JPL
512611	2016 TK_{16}	—	November 1, 2005	Kitt Peak	Spacewatch	·	3.6 km	MPC · JPL
512612	2016 TP_{16}	—	February 1, 2005	Catalina	CSS	HNS	1.4 km	MPC · JPL
512613	2016 TV_{20}	—	August 23, 2007	Kitt Peak	Spacewatch	·	1.6 km	MPC · JPL
512614	2016 TJ_{23}	—	January 30, 2008	Kitt Peak	Spacewatch	·	2.3 km	MPC · JPL
512615	2016 TW_{23}	—	October 16, 2007	Mount Lemmon	Mount Lemmon Survey	·	2.0 km	MPC · JPL
512616	2016 TQ_{25}	—	October 26, 2005	Kitt Peak	Spacewatch	·	2.7 km	MPC · JPL
512617	2016 TA_{34}	—	December 27, 2006	Mount Lemmon	Mount Lemmon Survey	·	2.8 km	MPC · JPL
512618	2016 TZ_{36}	—	April 4, 2014	Haleakala	Pan-STARRS 1	AGN	1.2 km	MPC · JPL
512619	2016 TK_{37}	—	December 30, 2008	Kitt Peak	Spacewatch	·	1.4 km	MPC · JPL
512620	2016 TM_{38}	—	January 11, 2008	Mount Lemmon	Mount Lemmon Survey	EOS	2.0 km	MPC · JPL
512621	2016 TJ_{39}	—	November 3, 2011	Mount Lemmon	Mount Lemmon Survey	EOS	1.4 km	MPC · JPL
512622	2016 TU_{39}	—	February 14, 2013	Haleakala	Pan-STARRS 1	·	2.6 km	MPC · JPL
512623	2016 TT_{41}	—	November 4, 2005	Kitt Peak	Spacewatch	·	1.3 km	MPC · JPL
512624	2016 TZ_{41}	—	September 26, 2011	Mount Lemmon	Mount Lemmon Survey	·	1.5 km	MPC · JPL
512625	2016 TD_{42}	—	September 29, 2005	Mount Lemmon	Mount Lemmon Survey	THM	1.8 km	MPC · JPL
512626	2016 TJ_{42}	—	September 4, 2011	Haleakala	Pan-STARRS 1	KOR	1.3 km	MPC · JPL
512627	2016 TP_{43}	—	October 30, 2007	Mount Lemmon	Mount Lemmon Survey	·	1.5 km	MPC · JPL
512628	2016 TU_{43}	—	September 6, 2008	Kitt Peak	Spacewatch	T_{j} (2.98) · 3:2	2.7 km	MPC · JPL
512629	2016 TM_{44}	—	March 19, 2001	Kitt Peak	Spacewatch	·	840 m	MPC · JPL
512630	2016 TN_{44}	—	October 12, 2007	Kitt Peak	Spacewatch	·	2.0 km	MPC · JPL
512631	2016 TL_{45}	—	October 10, 2012	Haleakala	Pan-STARRS 1	MAR	980 m	MPC · JPL
512632	2016 TC_{46}	—	April 14, 2008	Kitt Peak	Spacewatch	·	2.9 km	MPC · JPL
512633	2016 TU_{46}	—	November 9, 2007	Kitt Peak	Spacewatch	·	1.9 km	MPC · JPL
512634	2016 TA_{47}	—	April 12, 2000	Kitt Peak	Spacewatch	CYB	4.1 km	MPC · JPL
512635	2016 TN_{47}	—	April 15, 2005	Kitt Peak	Spacewatch	HOF	2.8 km	MPC · JPL
512636	2016 TO_{47}	—	October 9, 2004	Kitt Peak	Spacewatch	·	2.0 km	MPC · JPL
512637	2016 TU_{47}	—	November 19, 2007	Kitt Peak	Spacewatch	·	2.1 km	MPC · JPL
512638	2016 TW_{47}	—	May 24, 2014	Haleakala	Pan-STARRS 1	·	2.3 km	MPC · JPL
512639	2016 TX_{48}	—	December 13, 2006	Mount Lemmon	Mount Lemmon Survey	EOS	1.9 km	MPC · JPL
512640	2016 TT_{49}	—	April 17, 2005	Kitt Peak	Spacewatch	·	2.0 km	MPC · JPL
512641	2016 TS_{52}	—	June 25, 2011	Mount Lemmon	Mount Lemmon Survey	·	2.3 km	MPC · JPL
512642	2016 TA_{54}	—	December 25, 2011	Kitt Peak	Spacewatch	·	3.6 km	MPC · JPL
512643	2016 TB_{54}	—	January 4, 2012	Kitt Peak	Spacewatch	·	3.0 km	MPC · JPL
512644	2016 TT_{56}	—	January 21, 2006	Mount Lemmon	Mount Lemmon Survey	·	2.0 km	MPC · JPL
512645	2016 TE_{58}	—	September 4, 2007	Catalina	CSS	·	2.2 km	MPC · JPL
512646	2016 TC_{59}	—	October 11, 2007	Kitt Peak	Spacewatch	·	1.8 km	MPC · JPL
512647	2016 TC_{60}	—	November 5, 2005	Catalina	CSS	·	3.5 km	MPC · JPL
512648	2016 TG_{60}	—	May 20, 2006	Kitt Peak	Spacewatch	·	1.6 km	MPC · JPL
512649	2016 TR_{60}	—	August 28, 2006	Catalina	CSS	·	2.0 km	MPC · JPL
512650	2016 TF_{61}	—	February 26, 2014	Haleakala	Pan-STARRS 1	·	1.9 km	MPC · JPL
512651	2016 TY_{61}	—	April 29, 2008	Mount Lemmon	Mount Lemmon Survey	·	3.1 km	MPC · JPL
512652	2016 TB_{62}	—	September 9, 2007	Mount Lemmon	Mount Lemmon Survey	·	1.6 km	MPC · JPL
512653	2016 TZ_{64}	—	July 6, 2005	Kitt Peak	Spacewatch	EOS	2.4 km	MPC · JPL
512654	2016 TH_{65}	—	April 5, 2014	Haleakala	Pan-STARRS 1	EOS	1.8 km	MPC · JPL
512655	2016 TW_{67}	—	October 9, 2008	Mount Lemmon	Mount Lemmon Survey	·	1.6 km	MPC · JPL
512656	2016 TC_{68}	—	August 21, 2011	Haleakala	Pan-STARRS 1	·	1.8 km	MPC · JPL
512657	2016 TR_{68}	—	September 14, 2005	Kitt Peak	Spacewatch	·	2.2 km	MPC · JPL
512658	2016 TO_{70}	—	August 29, 2005	Kitt Peak	Spacewatch	·	2.4 km	MPC · JPL
512659	2016 TN_{71}	—	January 1, 2008	Kitt Peak	Spacewatch	KOR	1.6 km	MPC · JPL
512660	2016 TY_{71}	—	June 22, 2010	Mount Lemmon	Mount Lemmon Survey	·	2.2 km	MPC · JPL
512661	2016 TE_{72}	—	August 29, 2005	Kitt Peak	Spacewatch	·	2.8 km	MPC · JPL
512662	2016 TR_{72}	—	September 23, 2005	Kitt Peak	Spacewatch	·	2.6 km	MPC · JPL
512663	2016 TS_{72}	—	October 31, 2007	Kitt Peak	Spacewatch	·	2.2 km	MPC · JPL
512664	2016 TV_{72}	—	May 10, 2005	Kitt Peak	Spacewatch	·	2.1 km	MPC · JPL
512665	2016 TH_{74}	—	January 1, 2009	Mount Lemmon	Mount Lemmon Survey	·	1.6 km	MPC · JPL
512666	2016 TZ_{74}	—	September 14, 2006	Kitt Peak	Spacewatch	KOR	1.5 km	MPC · JPL
512667	2016 TE_{76}	—	November 24, 2008	Kitt Peak	Spacewatch	·	1.3 km	MPC · JPL
512668	2016 TO_{78}	—	November 23, 1998	Kitt Peak	Spacewatch	·	1.3 km	MPC · JPL
512669	2016 TR_{78}	—	July 1, 2009	Siding Spring	SSS	·	900 m	MPC · JPL
512670	2016 TE_{79}	—	October 4, 2003	Kitt Peak	Spacewatch	ADE	2.8 km	MPC · JPL
512671	2016 TH_{79}	—	February 8, 2008	Mount Lemmon	Mount Lemmon Survey	EOS	1.8 km	MPC · JPL
512672	2016 TQ_{79}	—	October 10, 2008	Mount Lemmon	Mount Lemmon Survey	T_{j} (2.96) · 3:2	3.3 km	MPC · JPL
512673	2016 TU_{79}	—	October 26, 2008	Kitt Peak	Spacewatch	·	1.7 km	MPC · JPL
512674	2016 TB_{80}	—	October 28, 2008	Kitt Peak	Spacewatch	·	1.2 km	MPC · JPL
512675	2016 TF_{80}	—	September 30, 2005	Mount Lemmon	Mount Lemmon Survey	THM	2.2 km	MPC · JPL
512676	2016 TE_{81}	—	October 1, 2003	Kitt Peak	Spacewatch	·	730 m	MPC · JPL
512677	2016 TT_{82}	—	December 11, 2004	Kitt Peak	Spacewatch	·	1.8 km	MPC · JPL
512678	2016 TZ_{82}	—	January 27, 2011	Mount Lemmon	Mount Lemmon Survey	·	1.1 km	MPC · JPL
512679	2016 TD_{85}	—	November 21, 2007	Mount Lemmon	Mount Lemmon Survey	·	2.4 km	MPC · JPL
512680	2016 TP_{87}	—	August 29, 2006	Kitt Peak	Spacewatch	·	1.8 km	MPC · JPL
512681	2016 TS_{89}	—	September 6, 1999	Kitt Peak	Spacewatch	THM	2.0 km	MPC · JPL
512682	2016 TZ_{90}	—	April 18, 2006	Kitt Peak	Spacewatch	·	1.2 km	MPC · JPL
512683	2016 TE_{91}	—	September 10, 2010	Kitt Peak	Spacewatch	VER	2.3 km	MPC · JPL
512684	2016 TN_{96}	—	January 19, 2005	Kitt Peak	Spacewatch	·	1.8 km	MPC · JPL
512685	2016 TO_{96}	—	October 12, 2007	Anderson Mesa	LONEOS	·	2.0 km	MPC · JPL
512686	2016 UU	—	October 27, 2003	Kitt Peak	Spacewatch	(12739)	1.6 km	MPC · JPL
512687	2016 UY	—	February 9, 2008	Mount Lemmon	Mount Lemmon Survey	EOS	1.9 km	MPC · JPL
512688	2016 UF_{1}	—	October 1, 2005	Mount Lemmon	Mount Lemmon Survey	·	2.2 km	MPC · JPL
512689	2016 UK_{1}	—	April 17, 2010	WISE	WISE	·	3.5 km	MPC · JPL
512690	2016 UL_{1}	—	September 23, 2008	Kitt Peak	Spacewatch	·	1.1 km	MPC · JPL
512691	2016 UD_{2}	—	December 30, 2008	Kitt Peak	Spacewatch	WIT	900 m	MPC · JPL
512692	2016 UB_{3}	—	January 10, 2013	Mount Lemmon	Mount Lemmon Survey	(43176)	3.1 km	MPC · JPL
512693	2016 UD_{3}	—	November 3, 2008	Mount Lemmon	Mount Lemmon Survey	·	1.3 km	MPC · JPL
512694	2016 UM_{3}	—	February 20, 2009	Mount Lemmon	Mount Lemmon Survey	·	1.5 km	MPC · JPL
512695	2016 US_{5}	—	September 10, 2008	Siding Spring	SSS	·	1.4 km	MPC · JPL
512696	2016 UL_{6}	—	August 18, 2009	Kitt Peak	Spacewatch	·	640 m	MPC · JPL
512697	2016 UN_{6}	—	January 10, 2008	Kitt Peak	Spacewatch	·	1.8 km	MPC · JPL
512698	2016 UR_{6}	—	January 15, 2009	Kitt Peak	Spacewatch	·	1.7 km	MPC · JPL
512699	2016 UY_{6}	—	April 4, 2014	Haleakala	Pan-STARRS 1	·	3.3 km	MPC · JPL
512700	2016 UW_{7}	—	June 30, 2005	Catalina	CSS	·	1.3 km	MPC · JPL

== 512701–512800 ==
back to top

Designation			Discovery			Properties		Ref
Permanent	Provisional	Named after	Date	Site	Discoverer(s)	Category	Diam.	Ref
512701	2016 UO_{8}	—	January 12, 2008	Kitt Peak	Spacewatch	NAE	2.1 km	MPC · JPL
512702	2016 UY_{8}	—	February 14, 2010	Mount Lemmon	Mount Lemmon Survey	EUN	1.1 km	MPC · JPL
512703	2016 UJ_{9}	—	November 22, 2012	Kitt Peak	Spacewatch	·	2.9 km	MPC · JPL
512704	2016 UB_{10}	—	October 22, 2012	Haleakala	Pan-STARRS 1	·	1.7 km	MPC · JPL
512705	2016 UG_{10}	—	September 24, 2008	Kitt Peak	Spacewatch	T_{j} (2.98) · 3:2	4.0 km	MPC · JPL
512706	2016 UT_{10}	—	October 14, 2012	Kitt Peak	Spacewatch	·	1.2 km	MPC · JPL
512707	2016 UU_{10}	—	September 22, 2003	Kitt Peak	Spacewatch	·	1.6 km	MPC · JPL
512708	2016 UL_{11}	—	September 13, 2007	Kitt Peak	Spacewatch	·	2.0 km	MPC · JPL
512709	2016 UN_{11}	—	November 20, 2007	Kitt Peak	Spacewatch	·	1.9 km	MPC · JPL
512710	2016 US_{11}	—	November 30, 2011	Mount Lemmon	Mount Lemmon Survey	·	2.5 km	MPC · JPL
512711	2016 UA_{12}	—	November 14, 1999	Kitt Peak	Spacewatch	·	1.9 km	MPC · JPL
512712	2016 UO_{12}	—	October 3, 2003	Kitt Peak	Spacewatch	·	1.7 km	MPC · JPL
512713	2016 US_{13}	—	March 23, 2015	Haleakala	Pan-STARRS 1	·	930 m	MPC · JPL
512714	2016 UA_{14}	—	March 5, 2011	Mount Lemmon	Mount Lemmon Survey	·	1 km	MPC · JPL
512715	2016 UC_{14}	—	March 10, 2007	Mount Lemmon	Mount Lemmon Survey	·	2.7 km	MPC · JPL
512716	2016 UD_{14}	—	November 24, 2011	Mount Lemmon	Mount Lemmon Survey	EOS	1.4 km	MPC · JPL
512717	2016 UK_{16}	—	August 30, 2005	Kitt Peak	Spacewatch	·	2.3 km	MPC · JPL
512718	2016 UQ_{17}	—	September 25, 1995	Kitt Peak	Spacewatch	BRG	1.7 km	MPC · JPL
512719	2016 UU_{17}	—	January 16, 2009	Kitt Peak	Spacewatch	·	1.4 km	MPC · JPL
512720	2016 UD_{18}	—	February 6, 2008	Kitt Peak	Spacewatch	·	3.0 km	MPC · JPL
512721	2016 UF_{18}	—	December 30, 2008	Mount Lemmon	Mount Lemmon Survey	·	1.7 km	MPC · JPL
512722	2016 UH_{18}	—	September 3, 2010	Mount Lemmon	Mount Lemmon Survey	EOS	2.1 km	MPC · JPL
512723	2016 UL_{18}	—	August 21, 2006	Kitt Peak	Spacewatch	·	680 m	MPC · JPL
512724	2016 US_{18}	—	June 14, 2008	Kitt Peak	Spacewatch	·	1.3 km	MPC · JPL
512725	2016 UM_{20}	—	November 1, 1999	Kitt Peak	Spacewatch	·	2.4 km	MPC · JPL
512726	2016 UN_{20}	—	September 16, 2003	Kitt Peak	Spacewatch	·	1.1 km	MPC · JPL
512727	2016 UZ_{20}	—	October 6, 1999	Kitt Peak	Spacewatch	·	2.5 km	MPC · JPL
512728	2016 UQ_{21}	—	September 13, 2005	Kitt Peak	Spacewatch	·	840 m	MPC · JPL
512729	2016 UF_{23}	—	August 28, 2006	Kitt Peak	Spacewatch	KOR · fast	1.3 km	MPC · JPL
512730	2016 UR_{24}	—	October 8, 2012	Haleakala	Pan-STARRS 1	·	1.0 km	MPC · JPL
512731	2016 UY_{24}	—	October 12, 2007	Kitt Peak	Spacewatch	·	1.6 km	MPC · JPL
512732	2016 UL_{26}	—	April 5, 2014	Haleakala	Pan-STARRS 1	EOS	1.9 km	MPC · JPL
512733	2016 UZ_{26}	—	August 27, 2006	Kitt Peak	Spacewatch	AGN	1.4 km	MPC · JPL
512734	2016 UE_{27}	—	September 13, 2005	Catalina	CSS	·	2.5 km	MPC · JPL
512735	2016 UJ_{27}	—	February 21, 2002	Kitt Peak	Spacewatch	·	2.2 km	MPC · JPL
512736	2016 UW_{27}	—	October 30, 2008	Kitt Peak	Spacewatch	·	1.3 km	MPC · JPL
512737	2016 UT_{28}	—	June 18, 2010	WISE	WISE	·	3.3 km	MPC · JPL
512738	2016 UU_{28}	—	September 18, 2010	Mount Lemmon	Mount Lemmon Survey	·	3.3 km	MPC · JPL
512739	2016 UW_{28}	—	April 5, 2014	Haleakala	Pan-STARRS 1	·	1.5 km	MPC · JPL
512740	2016 UH_{29}	—	May 25, 2010	WISE	WISE	URS	3.1 km	MPC · JPL
512741	2016 UK_{29}	—	June 26, 2011	Mount Lemmon	Mount Lemmon Survey	·	1.7 km	MPC · JPL
512742	2016 UV_{29}	—	September 3, 2007	Mount Lemmon	Mount Lemmon Survey	MAR	1.1 km	MPC · JPL
512743	2016 UX_{30}	—	February 8, 2007	Mount Lemmon	Mount Lemmon Survey	·	2.7 km	MPC · JPL
512744	2016 UY_{30}	—	July 23, 2015	Haleakala	Pan-STARRS 1	TIR	2.6 km	MPC · JPL
512745	2016 UG_{31}	—	March 15, 2015	Mount Lemmon	Mount Lemmon Survey	·	2.4 km	MPC · JPL
512746	2016 UU_{31}	—	November 20, 2012	Catalina	CSS	·	2.0 km	MPC · JPL
512747	2016 UE_{32}	—	November 19, 2007	Kitt Peak	Spacewatch	·	2.3 km	MPC · JPL
512748	2016 UM_{33}	—	November 23, 2011	Kitt Peak	Spacewatch	EOS	2.0 km	MPC · JPL
512749	2016 UP_{33}	—	November 7, 2010	Socorro	LINEAR	·	3.6 km	MPC · JPL
512750	2016 UF_{35}	—	May 30, 2010	WISE	WISE	·	2.3 km	MPC · JPL
512751	2016 UB_{39}	—	October 30, 2010	Mount Lemmon	Mount Lemmon Survey	CYB	3.0 km	MPC · JPL
512752	2016 US_{39}	—	September 12, 2004	Kitt Peak	Spacewatch	VER	2.5 km	MPC · JPL
512753	2016 UP_{42}	—	November 11, 2006	Kitt Peak	Spacewatch	EOS	2.3 km	MPC · JPL
512754	2016 UE_{45}	—	December 21, 2006	Mount Lemmon	Mount Lemmon Survey	·	3.4 km	MPC · JPL
512755	2016 UO_{45}	—	August 29, 2005	Kitt Peak	Spacewatch	·	2.4 km	MPC · JPL
512756	2016 UY_{45}	—	July 28, 2011	Haleakala	Pan-STARRS 1	·	1.9 km	MPC · JPL
512757	2016 UM_{46}	—	March 10, 2000	Kitt Peak	Spacewatch	·	2.1 km	MPC · JPL
512758	2016 UP_{46}	—	April 25, 2010	WISE	WISE	·	2.5 km	MPC · JPL
512759	2016 UV_{46}	—	February 8, 2008	Kitt Peak	Spacewatch	·	2.8 km	MPC · JPL
512760	2016 UY_{48}	—	December 10, 2005	Kitt Peak	Spacewatch	·	1.3 km	MPC · JPL
512761	2016 UQ_{49}	—	September 27, 2005	Kitt Peak	Spacewatch	·	2.3 km	MPC · JPL
512762	2016 UO_{51}	—	April 13, 2004	Kitt Peak	Spacewatch	·	2.2 km	MPC · JPL
512763	2016 UL_{53}	—	October 21, 2012	Mount Lemmon	Mount Lemmon Survey	·	1.5 km	MPC · JPL
512764	2016 UF_{54}	—	June 20, 2010	WISE	WISE	·	3.2 km	MPC · JPL
512765	2016 UT_{54}	—	November 19, 1995	Kitt Peak	Spacewatch	·	2.0 km	MPC · JPL
512766	2016 UY_{54}	—	April 1, 2013	Mount Lemmon	Mount Lemmon Survey	·	2.8 km	MPC · JPL
512767	2016 UP_{57}	—	April 5, 2008	Mount Lemmon	Mount Lemmon Survey	EUP	4.6 km	MPC · JPL
512768	2016 UT_{57}	—	August 24, 2011	Haleakala	Pan-STARRS 1	·	1.6 km	MPC · JPL
512769	2016 UA_{58}	—	February 10, 1996	Kitt Peak	Spacewatch	·	3.4 km	MPC · JPL
512770	2016 UB_{58}	—	October 23, 2005	Catalina	CSS	·	3.4 km	MPC · JPL
512771	2016 UK_{61}	—	October 1, 2005	Catalina	CSS	HYG	2.6 km	MPC · JPL
512772	2016 UC_{62}	—	April 8, 2010	Kitt Peak	Spacewatch	·	2.1 km	MPC · JPL
512773	2016 UF_{62}	—	October 15, 1999	Kitt Peak	Spacewatch	EUN	1.2 km	MPC · JPL
512774	2016 UM_{64}	—	January 31, 2009	Kitt Peak	Spacewatch	·	2.2 km	MPC · JPL
512775	2016 UY_{64}	—	December 22, 2008	Kitt Peak	Spacewatch	·	1.6 km	MPC · JPL
512776	2016 UA_{65}	—	January 7, 2006	Kitt Peak	Spacewatch	·	3.0 km	MPC · JPL
512777	2016 UR_{66}	—	November 2, 2008	Mount Lemmon	Mount Lemmon Survey	·	1.1 km	MPC · JPL
512778	2016 US_{69}	—	September 24, 2008	Kitt Peak	Spacewatch	3:2	3.9 km	MPC · JPL
512779	2016 UY_{69}	—	September 29, 2003	Anderson Mesa	LONEOS	·	1.7 km	MPC · JPL
512780	2016 UE_{70}	—	August 19, 2006	Kitt Peak	Spacewatch	KOR	1.2 km	MPC · JPL
512781	2016 UN_{70}	—	September 29, 2005	Mount Lemmon	Mount Lemmon Survey	NYS	920 m	MPC · JPL
512782	2016 UP_{70}	—	September 29, 2005	Mount Lemmon	Mount Lemmon Survey	·	2.5 km	MPC · JPL
512783	2016 UV_{70}	—	September 27, 2011	Mount Lemmon	Mount Lemmon Survey	EOS	1.4 km	MPC · JPL
512784	2016 UW_{71}	—	January 12, 2002	Kitt Peak	Spacewatch	3:2 · SHU	4.0 km	MPC · JPL
512785	2016 UL_{72}	—	September 19, 2011	Haleakala	Pan-STARRS 1	BRA	1.5 km	MPC · JPL
512786	2016 UQ_{72}	—	October 4, 1999	Kitt Peak	Spacewatch	VER	3.9 km	MPC · JPL
512787	2016 UW_{72}	—	September 21, 2012	Mount Lemmon	Mount Lemmon Survey	·	1.1 km	MPC · JPL
512788	2016 UT_{73}	—	March 11, 2005	Kitt Peak	Spacewatch	·	1.6 km	MPC · JPL
512789	2016 UU_{73}	—	August 18, 2006	Kitt Peak	Spacewatch	·	1.8 km	MPC · JPL
512790	2016 UV_{73}	—	March 25, 2014	Kitt Peak	Spacewatch	·	1.7 km	MPC · JPL
512791	2016 UO_{76}	—	September 30, 2010	Mount Lemmon	Mount Lemmon Survey	·	3.0 km	MPC · JPL
512792	2016 UJ_{77}	—	January 28, 2010	WISE	WISE	ULA · CYB	5.8 km	MPC · JPL
512793	2016 UK_{81}	—	September 1, 2005	Kitt Peak	Spacewatch	·	2.2 km	MPC · JPL
512794	2016 UX_{81}	—	May 5, 2006	Kitt Peak	Spacewatch	·	1.5 km	MPC · JPL
512795	2016 UO_{82}	—	April 4, 2005	Mount Lemmon	Mount Lemmon Survey	AST	1.9 km	MPC · JPL
512796	2016 UU_{82}	—	September 28, 1994	Kitt Peak	Spacewatch	·	2.2 km	MPC · JPL
512797	2016 UG_{84}	—	August 18, 2006	Kitt Peak	Spacewatch	KOR	1.2 km	MPC · JPL
512798	2016 UV_{84}	—	August 28, 2006	Kitt Peak	Spacewatch	KOR	1.2 km	MPC · JPL
512799	2016 UL_{86}	—	October 30, 2007	Kitt Peak	Spacewatch	AGN	950 m	MPC · JPL
512800	2016 UZ_{86}	—	October 6, 2005	Kitt Peak	Spacewatch	·	2.0 km	MPC · JPL

== 512801–512900 ==
back to top

Designation			Discovery			Properties		Ref
Permanent	Provisional	Named after	Date	Site	Discoverer(s)	Category	Diam.	Ref
512801	2016 UA_{87}	—	May 13, 2005	Mount Lemmon	Mount Lemmon Survey	·	1.6 km	MPC · JPL
512802	2016 UC_{88}	—	November 24, 2011	Mount Lemmon	Mount Lemmon Survey	·	1.8 km	MPC · JPL
512803	2016 UP_{88}	—	September 25, 2006	Mount Lemmon	Mount Lemmon Survey	KOR	1.3 km	MPC · JPL
512804	2016 UV_{89}	—	October 13, 2006	Kitt Peak	Spacewatch	·	1.5 km	MPC · JPL
512805	2016 UX_{89}	—	October 11, 1999	Kitt Peak	Spacewatch	·	2.9 km	MPC · JPL
512806	2016 UK_{90}	—	October 22, 1995	Kitt Peak	Spacewatch	·	1.3 km	MPC · JPL
512807	2016 UX_{90}	—	October 5, 2005	Kitt Peak	Spacewatch	·	2.1 km	MPC · JPL
512808	2016 UY_{90}	—	October 6, 1996	Kitt Peak	Spacewatch	·	1.1 km	MPC · JPL
512809	2016 US_{91}	—	May 25, 2006	Kitt Peak	Spacewatch	·	1.2 km	MPC · JPL
512810	2016 UL_{93}	—	October 12, 2007	Kitt Peak	Spacewatch	PAD	1.4 km	MPC · JPL
512811	2016 UP_{93}	—	October 19, 2007	Mount Lemmon	Mount Lemmon Survey	·	2.0 km	MPC · JPL
512812	2016 UX_{94}	—	October 20, 2008	Kitt Peak	Spacewatch	(5)	1.2 km	MPC · JPL
512813	2016 UH_{96}	—	September 18, 2007	Kitt Peak	Spacewatch	·	1.6 km	MPC · JPL
512814	2016 UC_{99}	—	April 16, 2005	Kitt Peak	Spacewatch	·	1.9 km	MPC · JPL
512815	2016 UR_{99}	—	April 20, 2010	Kitt Peak	Spacewatch	·	1.2 km	MPC · JPL
512816	2016 UW_{99}	—	September 23, 2006	Kitt Peak	Spacewatch	KOR	1.1 km	MPC · JPL
512817	2016 UE_{100}	—	September 15, 2007	Mount Lemmon	Mount Lemmon Survey	·	1.3 km	MPC · JPL
512818	2016 UZ_{100}	—	October 12, 2007	Catalina	CSS	(1547)	1.9 km	MPC · JPL
512819	2016 UQ_{101}	—	November 29, 2011	Kitt Peak	Spacewatch	·	2.6 km	MPC · JPL
512820	2016 UA_{102}	—	September 16, 2006	Kitt Peak	Spacewatch	KOR	1.5 km	MPC · JPL
512821	2016 UQ_{103}	—	May 28, 2000	Socorro	LINEAR	·	1.2 km	MPC · JPL
512822	2016 UL_{105}	—	April 11, 2005	Kitt Peak	Spacewatch	·	2.1 km	MPC · JPL
512823	2016 UR_{105}	—	October 6, 2004	Kitt Peak	Spacewatch	·	1.0 km	MPC · JPL
512824	2016 UV_{105}	—	December 20, 2001	Kitt Peak	Spacewatch	·	1.3 km	MPC · JPL
512825	2016 UN_{106}	—	March 28, 2014	Mount Lemmon	Mount Lemmon Survey	·	2.4 km	MPC · JPL
512826	2016 UN_{107}	—	July 3, 2005	Mount Lemmon	Mount Lemmon Survey	·	1.6 km	MPC · JPL
512827	2016 US_{107}	—	September 16, 2003	Kitt Peak	Spacewatch	·	1.1 km	MPC · JPL
512828	2016 UD_{109}	—	September 30, 2005	Mount Lemmon	Mount Lemmon Survey	·	2.7 km	MPC · JPL
512829	2016 UH_{111}	—	October 26, 2011	Haleakala	Pan-STARRS 1	EOS	1.3 km	MPC · JPL
512830	2016 UU_{111}	—	December 4, 2007	Mount Lemmon	Mount Lemmon Survey	·	2.4 km	MPC · JPL
512831	2016 UY_{111}	—	October 17, 2001	Kitt Peak	Spacewatch	·	1.3 km	MPC · JPL
512832	2016 UC_{112}	—	November 19, 2007	Kitt Peak	Spacewatch	·	1.6 km	MPC · JPL
512833	2016 UM_{114}	—	October 1, 2005	Kitt Peak	Spacewatch	·	2.0 km	MPC · JPL
512834	2016 UM_{117}	—	September 2, 2011	Haleakala	Pan-STARRS 1	·	1.5 km	MPC · JPL
512835	2016 UK_{118}	—	January 1, 2009	Mount Lemmon	Mount Lemmon Survey	·	1.7 km	MPC · JPL
512836	2016 UM_{122}	—	October 23, 2011	Kitt Peak	Spacewatch	EOS	1.6 km	MPC · JPL
512837	2016 UD_{123}	—	September 27, 2011	Mount Lemmon	Mount Lemmon Survey	EOS	1.6 km	MPC · JPL
512838	2016 UA_{124}	—	September 11, 2007	Mount Lemmon	Mount Lemmon Survey	·	1.5 km	MPC · JPL
512839	2016 UQ_{135}	—	February 3, 2013	Haleakala	Pan-STARRS 1	·	1.8 km	MPC · JPL
512840	2016 UD_{139}	—	June 23, 2010	WISE	WISE	T_{j} (2.99) · EUP	3.7 km	MPC · JPL
512841	2016 UW_{142}	—	August 9, 2011	Haleakala	Pan-STARRS 1	·	1.7 km	MPC · JPL
512842	2016 UN_{143}	—	October 4, 1999	Kitt Peak	Spacewatch	·	3.0 km	MPC · JPL
512843	2016 UT_{143}	—	April 22, 2007	Mount Lemmon	Mount Lemmon Survey	·	1.5 km	MPC · JPL
512844	2016 UB_{145}	—	October 7, 2007	Mount Lemmon	Mount Lemmon Survey	·	1.3 km	MPC · JPL
512845	2016 UO_{145}	—	June 13, 2010	WISE	WISE	EUP	3.6 km	MPC · JPL
512846	2016 UP_{145}	—	July 9, 2005	Kitt Peak	Spacewatch	·	680 m	MPC · JPL
512847	2016 UM_{146}	—	December 21, 2008	Mount Lemmon	Mount Lemmon Survey	·	1.4 km	MPC · JPL
512848	2016 UY_{146}	—	January 10, 2014	Mount Lemmon	Mount Lemmon Survey	·	1.4 km	MPC · JPL
512849	2016 VP_{3}	—	March 29, 2010	WISE	WISE	EUP	4.5 km	MPC · JPL
512850	2016 VQ_{8}	—	March 31, 2008	Mount Lemmon	Mount Lemmon Survey	·	3.0 km	MPC · JPL
512851	2016 VT_{8}	—	September 20, 2008	Mount Lemmon	Mount Lemmon Survey	·	840 m	MPC · JPL
512852	2016 VY_{8}	—	October 30, 2005	Mount Lemmon	Mount Lemmon Survey	VER	2.4 km	MPC · JPL
512853	2016 VG_{9}	—	June 24, 2014	Haleakala	Pan-STARRS 1	·	3.2 km	MPC · JPL
512854	2016 VJ_{11}	—	October 28, 1994	Kitt Peak	Spacewatch	·	3.3 km	MPC · JPL
512855	2016 VZ_{11}	—	September 10, 2007	Mount Lemmon	Mount Lemmon Survey	·	1.5 km	MPC · JPL
512856	2016 VD_{14}	—	July 2, 2011	Mount Lemmon	Mount Lemmon Survey	·	1.7 km	MPC · JPL
512857	2016 VN_{14}	—	April 6, 2008	Kitt Peak	Spacewatch	·	1.5 km	MPC · JPL
512858	2016 VR_{15}	—	September 18, 2007	Kitt Peak	Spacewatch	·	2.7 km	MPC · JPL
512859	2016 VV_{15}	—	September 18, 2010	Mount Lemmon	Mount Lemmon Survey	·	3.0 km	MPC · JPL
512860	2016 VO_{16}	—	October 19, 2011	Kitt Peak	Spacewatch	·	1.8 km	MPC · JPL
512861	2016 VS_{16}	—	November 1, 2007	Kitt Peak	Spacewatch	·	1.9 km	MPC · JPL
512862	2016 VR_{17}	—	March 17, 2007	Kitt Peak	Spacewatch	·	1.2 km	MPC · JPL
512863	2016 VG_{18}	—	November 19, 2003	Kitt Peak	Spacewatch	CYB	4.9 km	MPC · JPL
512864	2016 VC_{19}	—	July 17, 2010	WISE	WISE	EUP	4.2 km	MPC · JPL
512865	2016 VD_{19}	—	May 19, 2005	Mount Lemmon	Mount Lemmon Survey	·	2.3 km	MPC · JPL
512866	2016 VE_{19}	—	March 17, 2009	Kitt Peak	Spacewatch	·	1.9 km	MPC · JPL
512867	2016 VF_{19}	—	April 25, 2015	Haleakala	Pan-STARRS 1	EUN	930 m	MPC · JPL
512868	2016 VJ_{19}	—	January 26, 2006	Mount Lemmon	Mount Lemmon Survey	·	1.8 km	MPC · JPL
512869	2016 WB_{4}	—	March 4, 2008	Kitt Peak	Spacewatch	·	2.0 km	MPC · JPL
512870	2016 WR_{5}	—	April 7, 2008	Kitt Peak	Spacewatch	·	4.2 km	MPC · JPL
512871	2016 WA_{6}	—	November 11, 2004	Kitt Peak	Spacewatch	·	990 m	MPC · JPL
512872	2016 WN_{10}	—	November 25, 2011	Haleakala	Pan-STARRS 1	·	2.6 km	MPC · JPL
512873	2016 WE_{12}	—	February 15, 2013	Haleakala	Pan-STARRS 1	EOS	2.2 km	MPC · JPL
512874	2016 WT_{12}	—	June 5, 2014	Mount Lemmon	Mount Lemmon Survey	·	2.4 km	MPC · JPL
512875	2016 WY_{12}	—	September 10, 2010	Mount Lemmon	Mount Lemmon Survey	·	2.7 km	MPC · JPL
512876	2016 WT_{13}	—	June 17, 2010	Mount Lemmon	Mount Lemmon Survey	·	3.9 km	MPC · JPL
512877	2016 WM_{15}	—	January 17, 2007	Kitt Peak	Spacewatch	EOS	2.2 km	MPC · JPL
512878	2016 WN_{15}	—	March 11, 2005	Mount Lemmon	Mount Lemmon Survey	·	2.0 km	MPC · JPL
512879	2016 WT_{16}	—	October 24, 2008	Kitt Peak	Spacewatch	·	1.2 km	MPC · JPL
512880	2016 WP_{18}	—	October 31, 2005	Kitt Peak	Spacewatch	·	2.6 km	MPC · JPL
512881	2016 WD_{19}	—	November 9, 2009	Mount Lemmon	Mount Lemmon Survey	·	750 m	MPC · JPL
512882	2016 WQ_{19}	—	December 1, 2005	Kitt Peak	Spacewatch	URS	3.3 km	MPC · JPL
512883	2016 WQ_{21}	—	November 19, 2007	Mount Lemmon	Mount Lemmon Survey	GEF	1.5 km	MPC · JPL
512884	2016 WV_{22}	—	April 17, 2005	Kitt Peak	Spacewatch	·	1.8 km	MPC · JPL
512885	2016 WJ_{23}	—	March 29, 2014	Mount Lemmon	Mount Lemmon Survey	GAL	1.5 km	MPC · JPL
512886	2016 WR_{23}	—	April 28, 2010	WISE	WISE	EUP	3.2 km	MPC · JPL
512887	2016 WA_{25}	—	September 16, 2010	Kitt Peak	Spacewatch	THM	1.8 km	MPC · JPL
512888	2016 WL_{26}	—	November 25, 2005	Kitt Peak	Spacewatch	VER	2.7 km	MPC · JPL
512889	2016 WZ_{27}	—	November 11, 2007	Mount Lemmon	Mount Lemmon Survey	·	2.0 km	MPC · JPL
512890	2016 WH_{29}	—	July 18, 2015	Haleakala	Pan-STARRS 1	EOS	1.9 km	MPC · JPL
512891	2016 WD_{31}	—	April 20, 2010	Mount Lemmon	Mount Lemmon Survey	HNS	1.2 km	MPC · JPL
512892	2016 WN_{31}	—	November 6, 2008	Mount Lemmon	Mount Lemmon Survey	3:2	5.7 km	MPC · JPL
512893	2016 WE_{32}	—	March 15, 2007	Kitt Peak	Spacewatch	·	2.1 km	MPC · JPL
512894	2016 WV_{33}	—	June 29, 2010	WISE	WISE	·	3.2 km	MPC · JPL
512895	2016 WJ_{36}	—	November 18, 1995	Kitt Peak	Spacewatch	·	4.3 km	MPC · JPL
512896	2016 WM_{37}	—	May 10, 2005	Kitt Peak	Spacewatch	·	2.1 km	MPC · JPL
512897	2016 WU_{38}	—	August 29, 2005	Anderson Mesa	LONEOS	·	2.2 km	MPC · JPL
512898	2016 WF_{42}	—	November 20, 2000	Socorro	LINEAR	EOS	2.3 km	MPC · JPL
512899	2016 WN_{44}	—	June 21, 2007	Mount Lemmon	Mount Lemmon Survey	·	3.3 km	MPC · JPL
512900	2016 WX_{47}	—	November 30, 2003	Kitt Peak	Spacewatch	CYB	4.0 km	MPC · JPL

== 512901–513000 ==
back to top

Designation			Discovery			Properties		Ref
Permanent	Provisional	Named after	Date	Site	Discoverer(s)	Category	Diam.	Ref
512901	2016 WZ_{47}	—	December 29, 2008	Kitt Peak	Spacewatch	·	1.2 km	MPC · JPL
512902	2016 WG_{48}	—	October 1, 2005	Kitt Peak	Spacewatch	·	2.1 km	MPC · JPL
512903	2016 WZ_{48}	—	October 25, 2005	Mount Lemmon	Mount Lemmon Survey	·	3.5 km	MPC · JPL
512904	2016 WN_{49}	—	March 31, 2008	Mount Lemmon	Mount Lemmon Survey	EOS	2.1 km	MPC · JPL
512905	2016 WQ_{49}	—	November 7, 2012	Kitt Peak	Spacewatch	MAR	1.2 km	MPC · JPL
512906	2016 WW_{49}	—	November 30, 1999	Kitt Peak	Spacewatch	·	2.8 km	MPC · JPL
512907	2016 WX_{50}	—	September 29, 2008	Mount Lemmon	Mount Lemmon Survey	·	1.1 km	MPC · JPL
512908	2016 WL_{52}	—	January 20, 2009	Catalina	CSS	·	1.8 km	MPC · JPL
512909	2016 WA_{54}	—	November 9, 2009	Mount Lemmon	Mount Lemmon Survey	NYS	600 m	MPC · JPL
512910	2016 XB_{4}	—	October 30, 2005	Kitt Peak	Spacewatch	·	3.2 km	MPC · JPL
512911	2016 XE_{4}	—	January 18, 2005	Kitt Peak	Spacewatch	·	1.7 km	MPC · JPL
512912	2016 XL_{4}	—	May 7, 2008	Kitt Peak	Spacewatch	·	3.9 km	MPC · JPL
512913	2016 XT_{4}	—	August 8, 2010	WISE	WISE	·	3.6 km	MPC · JPL
512914	2016 XF_{5}	—	November 25, 2000	Kitt Peak	Spacewatch	3:2	4.5 km	MPC · JPL
512915	2016 XP_{5}	—	September 10, 2004	Kitt Peak	Spacewatch	·	3.4 km	MPC · JPL
512916	2016 XR_{5}	—	October 29, 2005	Catalina	CSS	TIR	3.3 km	MPC · JPL
512917	2016 XY_{5}	—	December 21, 2008	Catalina	CSS	·	4.5 km	MPC · JPL
512918	2016 XA_{6}	—	November 30, 2005	Socorro	LINEAR	·	3.3 km	MPC · JPL
512919	2016 XN_{7}	—	September 29, 2011	Kitt Peak	Spacewatch	615	1.6 km	MPC · JPL
512920	2016 XB_{9}	—	September 11, 2010	Kitt Peak	Spacewatch	HYG	3.1 km	MPC · JPL
512921	2016 XJ_{10}	—	July 28, 2010	WISE	WISE	·	2.6 km	MPC · JPL
512922	2016 XQ_{11}	—	October 29, 2010	Mount Lemmon	Mount Lemmon Survey	·	4.4 km	MPC · JPL
512923	2016 XA_{14}	—	December 29, 2011	Mount Lemmon	Mount Lemmon Survey	·	4.1 km	MPC · JPL
512924	2016 XO_{14}	—	November 28, 2006	Mount Lemmon	Mount Lemmon Survey	·	2.3 km	MPC · JPL
512925	2016 XW_{19}	—	January 7, 2010	WISE	WISE	·	6.1 km	MPC · JPL
512926	2016 XA_{20}	—	January 14, 2008	Kitt Peak	Spacewatch	·	2.6 km	MPC · JPL
512927	2016 XR_{20}	—	October 23, 2006	Kitt Peak	Spacewatch	·	2.1 km	MPC · JPL
512928	2016 XC_{23}	—	September 19, 2006	Catalina	CSS	BRA	1.6 km	MPC · JPL
512929	2016 XF_{23}	—	October 12, 2010	Mount Lemmon	Mount Lemmon Survey	·	2.8 km	MPC · JPL
512930	2017 AA_{4}	—	October 31, 2008	Mount Lemmon	Mount Lemmon Survey	·	3.5 km	MPC · JPL
512931	2017 AR_{6}	—	April 14, 2007	Kitt Peak	Spacewatch	·	3.6 km	MPC · JPL
512932	2017 AW_{8}	—	January 23, 2006	Kitt Peak	Spacewatch	fast	4.0 km	MPC · JPL
512933	2017 AD_{13}	—	March 24, 2010	WISE	WISE	L5	10 km	MPC · JPL
512934	2017 AG_{19}	—	April 27, 2009	Mount Lemmon	Mount Lemmon Survey	T_{j} (2.9) · CYB	4.6 km	MPC · JPL
512935	2017 BX_{3}	—	September 29, 2009	Mount Lemmon	Mount Lemmon Survey	·	550 m	MPC · JPL
512936	2017 BE_{6}	—	May 1, 2009	Mount Lemmon	Mount Lemmon Survey	L5	10 km	MPC · JPL
512937	2017 BA_{11}	—	March 15, 2012	Mount Lemmon	Mount Lemmon Survey	·	3.2 km	MPC · JPL
512938	2017 BT_{12}	—	January 9, 2006	Kitt Peak	Spacewatch	L5	10 km	MPC · JPL
512939	2017 BM_{16}	—	July 1, 2011	Mount Lemmon	Mount Lemmon Survey	L5	10 km	MPC · JPL
512940	2017 BC_{45}	—	September 16, 2003	Kitt Peak	Spacewatch	·	4.0 km	MPC · JPL
512941	2017 BB_{59}	—	September 29, 2009	Mount Lemmon	Mount Lemmon Survey	·	650 m	MPC · JPL
512942	2017 BC_{68}	—	November 18, 2006	Kitt Peak	Spacewatch	·	540 m	MPC · JPL
512943	2017 BQ_{88}	—	December 27, 2006	Mount Lemmon	Mount Lemmon Survey	EOS	2.3 km	MPC · JPL
512944	2017 BE_{93}	—	December 22, 2003	Kitt Peak	Spacewatch	L5	10 km	MPC · JPL
512945	2017 BF_{93}	—	April 27, 2010	WISE	WISE	L5	10 km	MPC · JPL
512946	2017 CK	—	May 14, 2008	Kitt Peak	Spacewatch	L5	10 km	MPC · JPL
512947	2017 CZ	—	September 4, 2014	Haleakala	Pan-STARRS 1	L5	9.4 km	MPC · JPL
512948	2017 CD_{32}	—	December 27, 2005	Kitt Peak	Spacewatch	T_{j} (2.92)	3.5 km	MPC · JPL
512949	2017 DU_{1}	—	February 16, 2004	Kitt Peak	Spacewatch	·	1.5 km	MPC · JPL
512950	2017 EL_{5}	—	December 28, 2003	Kitt Peak	Spacewatch	L5	10 km	MPC · JPL
512951	2017 FH_{54}	—	January 19, 2005	Kitt Peak	Spacewatch	·	4.5 km	MPC · JPL
512952	2017 FU_{127}	—	June 6, 2006	Siding Spring	SSS	·	2.1 km	MPC · JPL
512953	2017 FV_{157}	—	March 21, 2010	WISE	WISE	CYB	3.3 km	MPC · JPL
512954	2017 NL_{5}	—	August 20, 2009	Catalina	CSS	·	1.7 km	MPC · JPL
512955	2017 OO_{41}	—	February 21, 2009	Kitt Peak	Spacewatch	·	3.4 km	MPC · JPL
512956	2017 OH_{67}	—	August 28, 2013	Haleakala	Pan-STARRS 1	PHO	860 m	MPC · JPL
512957	2017 RL_{17}	—	October 9, 2004	Kitt Peak	Spacewatch	·	1.9 km	MPC · JPL
512958	2017 SX_{8}	—	August 19, 2012	Siding Spring	SSS	BRA	1.8 km	MPC · JPL
512959	2017 SZ_{26}	—	January 25, 2006	Kitt Peak	Spacewatch	·	1.3 km	MPC · JPL
512960	2017 SX_{28}	—	April 19, 2009	Kitt Peak	Spacewatch	ARM	2.7 km	MPC · JPL
512961	2017 SB_{29}	—	February 2, 2005	Kitt Peak	Spacewatch	·	2.1 km	MPC · JPL
512962	2017 SW_{33}	—	September 19, 2009	Kitt Peak	Spacewatch	·	1.5 km	MPC · JPL
512963	2017 SQ_{35}	—	April 5, 2016	Haleakala	Pan-STARRS 1	V	560 m	MPC · JPL
512964	2017 SV_{36}	—	October 16, 2013	Mount Lemmon	Mount Lemmon Survey	MAR	1.1 km	MPC · JPL
512965	2017 SB_{37}	—	December 30, 2007	Mount Lemmon	Mount Lemmon Survey	·	3.0 km	MPC · JPL
512966	2017 SX_{39}	—	May 16, 2012	Mount Lemmon	Mount Lemmon Survey	·	1.6 km	MPC · JPL
512967	2017 SX_{42}	—	December 20, 2007	Kitt Peak	Spacewatch	·	2.1 km	MPC · JPL
512968	2017 TO_{7}	—	March 11, 2016	Haleakala	Pan-STARRS 1	(1547)	1.9 km	MPC · JPL
512969	2017 TR_{7}	—	October 15, 2004	Mount Lemmon	Mount Lemmon Survey	·	1.7 km	MPC · JPL
512970	2017 TU_{7}	—	July 5, 2010	Kitt Peak	Spacewatch	·	620 m	MPC · JPL
512971	2017 TG_{8}	—	February 2, 2015	Haleakala	Pan-STARRS 1	PHO	900 m	MPC · JPL
512972	2017 TM_{10}	—	December 20, 2009	Mount Lemmon	Mount Lemmon Survey	·	1.4 km	MPC · JPL
512973	2017 TU_{11}	—	March 20, 2012	Haleakala	Pan-STARRS 1	·	1.8 km	MPC · JPL
512974	2017 TY_{11}	—	July 29, 2014	Haleakala	Pan-STARRS 1	·	950 m	MPC · JPL
512975	2017 TA_{14}	—	October 27, 2006	Catalina	CSS	·	3.0 km	MPC · JPL
512976	2017 UQ_{8}	—	September 15, 2007	Anderson Mesa	LONEOS	·	670 m	MPC · JPL
512977	2017 UY_{8}	—	March 13, 2016	Haleakala	Pan-STARRS 1	·	1.7 km	MPC · JPL
512978	2017 UA_{9}	—	October 12, 2009	La Sagra	OAM	·	1.1 km	MPC · JPL
512979	2017 UA_{10}	—	July 29, 2000	Anderson Mesa	LONEOS	·	790 m	MPC · JPL
512980	2017 UC_{12}	—	July 13, 2009	Kitt Peak	Spacewatch	MAS	740 m	MPC · JPL
512981	2017 UD_{12}	—	September 22, 2009	Mount Lemmon	Mount Lemmon Survey	(5)	1.2 km	MPC · JPL
512982	2017 UG_{14}	—	September 20, 2001	Socorro	LINEAR	·	2.3 km	MPC · JPL
512983	2017 UV_{14}	—	April 28, 2011	Mount Lemmon	Mount Lemmon Survey	·	1.9 km	MPC · JPL
512984	2017 UM_{15}	—	February 16, 2009	Kitt Peak	Spacewatch	·	1.9 km	MPC · JPL
512985	2017 UT_{27}	—	September 16, 2006	Kitt Peak	Spacewatch	·	2.2 km	MPC · JPL
512986	2017 UY_{28}	—	October 19, 2006	Mount Lemmon	Mount Lemmon Survey	·	2.6 km	MPC · JPL
512987	2017 UD_{34}	—	February 11, 2008	Mount Lemmon	Mount Lemmon Survey	·	650 m	MPC · JPL
512988	2017 UZ_{34}	—	November 12, 2013	Mount Lemmon	Mount Lemmon Survey	EUN	1.2 km	MPC · JPL
512989	2017 UG_{35}	—	October 11, 2006	Kitt Peak	Spacewatch	·	2.5 km	MPC · JPL
512990	2017 UD_{36}	—	September 16, 2010	Mount Lemmon	Mount Lemmon Survey	·	750 m	MPC · JPL
512991	2017 UK_{36}	—	November 10, 2006	Kitt Peak	Spacewatch	LIX	4.1 km	MPC · JPL
512992	2017 UJ_{37}	—	February 2, 2008	Mount Lemmon	Mount Lemmon Survey	NYS	850 m	MPC · JPL
512993	2017 UW_{37}	—	September 25, 2006	Kitt Peak	Spacewatch	·	2.4 km	MPC · JPL
512994	2017 UY_{37}	—	September 30, 2013	Catalina	CSS	PHO	840 m	MPC · JPL
512995	2017 UB_{38}	—	October 5, 2004	Kitt Peak	Spacewatch	·	1.9 km	MPC · JPL
512996	2017 UG_{39}	—	January 25, 2007	Kitt Peak	Spacewatch	·	910 m	MPC · JPL
512997	2017 UL_{40}	—	January 10, 2014	Mount Lemmon	Mount Lemmon Survey	·	1.9 km	MPC · JPL
512998	2017 UZ_{41}	—	August 16, 2012	Haleakala	Pan-STARRS 1	·	2.2 km	MPC · JPL
512999	2017 UF_{42}	—	October 2, 1995	Kitt Peak	Spacewatch	·	2.3 km	MPC · JPL
513000	2017 UK_{42}	—	December 20, 2007	Mount Lemmon	Mount Lemmon Survey	·	2.1 km	MPC · JPL

back to top
