= List of minor planets: 539001–540000 =

The following is a partial list of minor planets, running from minor-planet number 539001 through 540000, inclusive. The primary data for this and other partial lists is based on JPL's "Small-Body Orbital Elements" and data available from the Minor Planet Center. Critical list information is also provided by the MPC, unless otherwise specified from Lowell Observatory. A detailed description of the table's columns and additional sources are given on the main page including a complete list of every page in this series, and a statistical break-up on the dynamical classification of minor planets.

Also see the summary list of all named bodies in numerical and alphabetical order, and the corresponding naming citations for the number range of this particular list. New namings may only be added to this list after official publication, as the preannouncement of names is condemned by the Working Group for Small Bodies Nomenclature of the International Astronomical Union.

Near-Earth obj.	MBA (inner)	MBA (outer)	Centaur
Mars-crosser	MBA (middle)	Jupiter trojan	Trans-Neptunian obj.
Unclassified

== 539001–539100 ==
Designation			Discovery			Properties		Ref
Permanent	Provisional	Named after	Date	Site	Discoverer(s)	Category	Diam.	Ref
539001	2016 KE_{10}	—	January 30, 2012	Mount Lemmon	Mount Lemmon Survey	·	1.0 km	MPC · JPL
539002	2016 LX_{3}	—	March 9, 2007	Kitt Peak	Spacewatch	·	1.3 km	MPC · JPL
539003	2016 LT_{11}	—	January 27, 2015	Haleakala	Pan-STARRS 1	·	2.2 km	MPC · JPL
539004	2016 LH_{12}	—	November 13, 2010	Mount Lemmon	Mount Lemmon Survey	·	700 m	MPC · JPL
539005	2016 LN_{12}	—	November 9, 2013	Haleakala	Pan-STARRS 1	·	2.4 km	MPC · JPL
539006	2016 LS_{12}	—	October 29, 2003	Kitt Peak	Spacewatch	·	1.1 km	MPC · JPL
539007	2016 LL_{22}	—	June 4, 2010	Kitt Peak	Spacewatch	·	2.6 km	MPC · JPL
539008	2016 LB_{29}	—	December 11, 2013	Haleakala	Pan-STARRS 1	EOS	1.7 km	MPC · JPL
539009	2016 LP_{36}	—	January 27, 2015	Haleakala	Pan-STARRS 1	·	2.2 km	MPC · JPL
539010	2016 LQ_{36}	—	May 30, 2016	Haleakala	Pan-STARRS 1	·	1.3 km	MPC · JPL
539011	2016 LQ_{38}	—	February 17, 2010	Kitt Peak	Spacewatch	·	1.8 km	MPC · JPL
539012	2016 LR_{40}	—	December 30, 2008	Mount Lemmon	Mount Lemmon Survey	·	3.2 km	MPC · JPL
539013	2016 LA_{50}	—	December 29, 2014	Haleakala	Pan-STARRS 1	·	2.6 km	MPC · JPL
539014	2016 LX_{55}	—	January 23, 2006	Mount Lemmon	Mount Lemmon Survey	·	1.6 km	MPC · JPL
539015	2016 LJ_{56}	—	March 29, 2006	Kitt Peak	Spacewatch	·	1.8 km	MPC · JPL
539016	2016 LK_{56}	—	March 2, 2011	Kitt Peak	Spacewatch	·	1.6 km	MPC · JPL
539017	2016 LM_{56}	—	January 17, 2007	Mount Lemmon	Mount Lemmon Survey	·	4.1 km	MPC · JPL
539018	2016 LP_{56}	—	October 2, 2006	Mount Lemmon	Mount Lemmon Survey	·	2.5 km	MPC · JPL
539019	2016 LV_{56}	—	March 29, 2011	Kitt Peak	Spacewatch	MAR	750 m	MPC · JPL
539020	2016 LX_{56}	—	June 2, 2016	Mount Lemmon	Mount Lemmon Survey	·	2.0 km	MPC · JPL
539021	2016 LY_{56}	—	October 12, 2007	Mount Lemmon	Mount Lemmon Survey	·	1.7 km	MPC · JPL
539022	2016 LK_{57}	—	November 5, 2007	Mount Lemmon	Mount Lemmon Survey	·	2.0 km	MPC · JPL
539023	2016 LM_{57}	—	July 18, 2012	Catalina	CSS	EUN	1.2 km	MPC · JPL
539024	2016 LO_{57}	—	January 16, 2015	Haleakala	Pan-STARRS 1	·	1.0 km	MPC · JPL
539025	2016 LT_{57}	—	April 4, 2008	Mount Lemmon	Mount Lemmon Survey	V	640 m	MPC · JPL
539026	2016 LW_{57}	—	October 8, 2008	Mount Lemmon	Mount Lemmon Survey	·	1.4 km	MPC · JPL
539027	2016 LN_{58}	—	February 10, 2014	Haleakala	Pan-STARRS 1	·	1.7 km	MPC · JPL
539028	2016 LP_{58}	—	November 28, 2013	Mount Lemmon	Mount Lemmon Survey	·	3.1 km	MPC · JPL
539029	2016 LR_{58}	—	March 6, 2011	Mount Lemmon	Mount Lemmon Survey	·	1.0 km	MPC · JPL
539030	2016 LS_{58}	—	October 8, 2008	Mount Lemmon	Mount Lemmon Survey	·	1.2 km	MPC · JPL
539031	2016 LU_{58}	—	November 11, 2013	Kitt Peak	Spacewatch	EUN	1.1 km	MPC · JPL
539032	2016 LX_{58}	—	December 23, 2001	Kitt Peak	Spacewatch	·	2.8 km	MPC · JPL
539033	2016 LY_{58}	—	September 28, 2003	Kitt Peak	Spacewatch	·	2.4 km	MPC · JPL
539034	2016 LB_{59}	—	September 20, 2003	Kitt Peak	Spacewatch	·	1.9 km	MPC · JPL
539035	2016 LC_{59}	—	May 1, 2003	Kitt Peak	Spacewatch	·	1.3 km	MPC · JPL
539036	2016 LE_{59}	—	January 17, 2007	Kitt Peak	Spacewatch	·	1.7 km	MPC · JPL
539037	2016 LG_{59}	—	March 29, 2008	Kitt Peak	Spacewatch	·	1.1 km	MPC · JPL
539038	2016 LK_{59}	—	June 2, 2016	Haleakala	Pan-STARRS 1	·	1.3 km	MPC · JPL
539039	2016 LT_{59}	—	February 25, 2015	Haleakala	Pan-STARRS 1	·	3.1 km	MPC · JPL
539040	2016 LY_{59}	—	October 27, 2013	Kitt Peak	Spacewatch	·	1.1 km	MPC · JPL
539041	2016 LU_{60}	—	December 12, 2014	Haleakala	Pan-STARRS 1	·	1.2 km	MPC · JPL
539042	2016 LE_{61}	—	May 22, 2011	Mount Lemmon	Mount Lemmon Survey	·	1.5 km	MPC · JPL
539043	2016 LM_{61}	—	May 30, 2011	Haleakala	Pan-STARRS 1	DOR	1.8 km	MPC · JPL
539044	2016 LO_{61}	—	January 16, 2015	Haleakala	Pan-STARRS 1	PHO	900 m	MPC · JPL
539045	2016 LG_{62}	—	August 24, 2007	Kitt Peak	Spacewatch	GEF	1.1 km	MPC · JPL
539046	2016 LW_{62}	—	January 26, 2015	Haleakala	Pan-STARRS 1	·	1.6 km	MPC · JPL
539047	2016 LQ_{63}	—	September 25, 2012	Mount Lemmon	Mount Lemmon Survey	HNS	740 m	MPC · JPL
539048	2016 LZ_{63}	—	December 3, 2013	Mount Lemmon	Mount Lemmon Survey	·	1.0 km	MPC · JPL
539049	2016 LF_{64}	—	January 8, 2011	Mount Lemmon	Mount Lemmon Survey	·	1.1 km	MPC · JPL
539050	2016 LL_{64}	—	January 7, 2014	Mount Lemmon	Mount Lemmon Survey	·	2.0 km	MPC · JPL
539051	2016 LW_{64}	—	January 20, 2008	Kitt Peak	Spacewatch	·	1.3 km	MPC · JPL
539052	2016 LA_{65}	—	September 18, 2003	Kitt Peak	Spacewatch	·	590 m	MPC · JPL
539053	2016 LC_{65}	—	September 26, 2006	Mount Lemmon	Mount Lemmon Survey	MAS	840 m	MPC · JPL
539054	2016 LF_{65}	—	April 11, 2007	Kitt Peak	Spacewatch	WIT	1.3 km	MPC · JPL
539055	2016 LR_{65}	—	December 18, 2007	Kitt Peak	Spacewatch	·	1.1 km	MPC · JPL
539056	2016 LS_{65}	—	January 18, 2009	Kitt Peak	Spacewatch	·	560 m	MPC · JPL
539057	2016 LT_{65}	—	December 18, 2009	Mount Lemmon	Mount Lemmon Survey	·	2.0 km	MPC · JPL
539058	2016 LB_{66}	—	October 9, 2007	Kitt Peak	Spacewatch	·	680 m	MPC · JPL
539059	2016 LG_{67}	—	March 11, 2011	Kitt Peak	Spacewatch	·	1.7 km	MPC · JPL
539060	2016 LR_{67}	—	October 14, 2004	Kitt Peak	Spacewatch	·	2.1 km	MPC · JPL
539061	2016 LQ_{68}	—	September 13, 2007	Kitt Peak	Spacewatch	·	540 m	MPC · JPL
539062	2016 MQ	—	May 16, 2012	Mount Lemmon	Mount Lemmon Survey	·	840 m	MPC · JPL
539063	2016 MK_{1}	—	June 29, 2016	Haleakala	Pan-STARRS 1	APO · PHA	530 m	MPC · JPL
539064	2016 MP_{1}	—	January 29, 2012	Kitt Peak	Spacewatch	V	600 m	MPC · JPL
539065	2016 MC_{2}	—	January 15, 2015	Haleakala	Pan-STARRS 1	·	1.3 km	MPC · JPL
539066	2016 MG_{2}	—	October 15, 2004	Kitt Peak	Spacewatch	·	800 m	MPC · JPL
539067	2016 MA_{3}	—	October 10, 2012	Mount Lemmon	Mount Lemmon Survey	·	1.9 km	MPC · JPL
539068	2016 MV_{3}	—	October 18, 2012	Mount Lemmon	Mount Lemmon Survey	EUN	1.3 km	MPC · JPL
539069	2016 MY_{3}	—	February 26, 2014	Haleakala	Pan-STARRS 1	EOS	2.0 km	MPC · JPL
539070	2016 MR_{4}	—	February 26, 2014	Mount Lemmon	Mount Lemmon Survey	·	1.9 km	MPC · JPL
539071	2016 NC_{2}	—	January 20, 2015	Haleakala	Pan-STARRS 1	·	630 m	MPC · JPL
539072	2016 NC_{5}	—	January 30, 2004	Kitt Peak	Spacewatch	·	990 m	MPC · JPL
539073	2016 NH_{5}	—	December 31, 2005	Kitt Peak	Spacewatch	·	2.0 km	MPC · JPL
539074	2016 NQ_{5}	—	October 1, 2005	Mount Lemmon	Mount Lemmon Survey	·	1.1 km	MPC · JPL
539075	2016 NJ_{8}	—	September 15, 2009	Kitt Peak	Spacewatch	·	1.6 km	MPC · JPL
539076	2016 NS_{8}	—	January 2, 2009	Kitt Peak	Spacewatch	·	2.8 km	MPC · JPL
539077	2016 NT_{8}	—	November 19, 2008	Catalina	CSS	·	1.3 km	MPC · JPL
539078	2016 NK_{9}	—	January 3, 2014	Kitt Peak	Spacewatch	HOF	2.4 km	MPC · JPL
539079	2016 NU_{10}	—	December 25, 2005	Kitt Peak	Spacewatch	·	1.2 km	MPC · JPL
539080	2016 NW_{12}	—	April 20, 2010	WISE	WISE	·	2.8 km	MPC · JPL
539081	2016 NA_{13}	—	April 22, 2009	Mount Lemmon	Mount Lemmon Survey	·	660 m	MPC · JPL
539082	2016 NF_{16}	—	January 7, 2013	Mount Lemmon	Mount Lemmon Survey	T_{j} (2.9)	3.9 km	MPC · JPL
539083	2016 NC_{17}	—	November 20, 2006	Kitt Peak	Spacewatch	·	940 m	MPC · JPL
539084	2016 NH_{18}	—	November 2, 2013	Mount Lemmon	Mount Lemmon Survey	·	1.6 km	MPC · JPL
539085	2016 NC_{21}	—	June 27, 2009	La Sagra	OAM	·	720 m	MPC · JPL
539086	2016 NH_{21}	—	January 21, 2015	Haleakala	Pan-STARRS 1	·	1.1 km	MPC · JPL
539087	2016 NA_{24}	—	December 25, 2013	Kitt Peak	Spacewatch	·	1.6 km	MPC · JPL
539088	2016 NW_{27}	—	January 20, 2015	Haleakala	Pan-STARRS 1	PHO	830 m	MPC · JPL
539089	2016 NE_{31}	—	November 27, 2006	Kitt Peak	Spacewatch	·	2.7 km	MPC · JPL
539090	2016 NA_{33}	—	September 26, 2006	Catalina	CSS	·	690 m	MPC · JPL
539091	2016 NR_{34}	—	May 1, 2009	Mount Lemmon	Mount Lemmon Survey	·	540 m	MPC · JPL
539092	2016 ND_{37}	—	September 3, 2008	Kitt Peak	Spacewatch	·	1.0 km	MPC · JPL
539093	2016 NO_{37}	—	February 23, 2015	Haleakala	Pan-STARRS 1	·	1.9 km	MPC · JPL
539094	2016 NG_{41}	—	March 30, 2008	Kitt Peak	Spacewatch	NYS	1.0 km	MPC · JPL
539095	2016 NF_{42}	—	October 21, 2006	Kitt Peak	Spacewatch	·	2.3 km	MPC · JPL
539096	2016 NA_{43}	—	January 16, 2015	Haleakala	Pan-STARRS 1	PHO	1.0 km	MPC · JPL
539097	2016 NK_{45}	—	July 29, 2009	Kitt Peak	Spacewatch	V	610 m	MPC · JPL
539098	2016 ND_{47}	—	August 17, 1999	Kitt Peak	Spacewatch	VER	3.0 km	MPC · JPL
539099	2016 NT_{48}	—	March 16, 2010	WISE	WISE	·	2.9 km	MPC · JPL
539100	2016 NX_{48}	—	November 20, 2003	Kitt Peak	Spacewatch	·	1.1 km	MPC · JPL

== 539101–539200 ==
back to top

Designation			Discovery			Properties		Ref
Permanent	Provisional	Named after	Date	Site	Discoverer(s)	Category	Diam.	Ref
539101	2016 NB_{49}	—	July 13, 2016	Mount Lemmon	Mount Lemmon Survey	·	1.0 km	MPC · JPL
539102	2016 NA_{50}	—	September 26, 2012	Mount Lemmon	Mount Lemmon Survey	EUN	920 m	MPC · JPL
539103	2016 NT_{50}	—	July 18, 2012	Catalina	CSS	·	950 m	MPC · JPL
539104	2016 NK_{54}	—	April 6, 2008	Mount Lemmon	Mount Lemmon Survey	·	1.2 km	MPC · JPL
539105	2016 NN_{54}	—	December 4, 2013	Haleakala	Pan-STARRS 1	·	2.1 km	MPC · JPL
539106	2016 NC_{62}	—	July 11, 2016	Haleakala	Pan-STARRS 1	·	2.1 km	MPC · JPL
539107	2016 NB_{64}	—	May 16, 2010	WISE	WISE	·	3.6 km	MPC · JPL
539108	2016 NG_{65}	—	March 4, 2005	Mount Lemmon	Mount Lemmon Survey	BRA	1.5 km	MPC · JPL
539109	2016 NS_{65}	—	March 16, 2005	Mount Lemmon	Mount Lemmon Survey	·	1.7 km	MPC · JPL
539110	2016 NV_{65}	—	June 8, 2016	Mount Lemmon	Mount Lemmon Survey	·	2.7 km	MPC · JPL
539111	2016 NW_{65}	—	March 22, 2015	Haleakala	Pan-STARRS 1	·	830 m	MPC · JPL
539112	2016 NZ_{65}	—	March 20, 2002	Kitt Peak	Spacewatch	·	1.2 km	MPC · JPL
539113	2016 NJ_{66}	—	May 6, 2006	Mount Lemmon	Mount Lemmon Survey	·	1.9 km	MPC · JPL
539114	2016 NN_{66}	—	July 4, 2016	Haleakala	Pan-STARRS 1	HYG	2.5 km	MPC · JPL
539115	2016 NO_{66}	—	September 18, 2011	Mount Lemmon	Mount Lemmon Survey	THM	1.9 km	MPC · JPL
539116	2016 NQ_{66}	—	July 18, 2012	Siding Spring	SSS	·	1.2 km	MPC · JPL
539117	2016 NR_{66}	—	April 18, 2015	Haleakala	Pan-STARRS 1	EOS	1.9 km	MPC · JPL
539118	2016 NS_{66}	—	November 17, 2006	Mount Lemmon	Mount Lemmon Survey	·	3.3 km	MPC · JPL
539119	2016 NT_{66}	—	April 23, 2015	Haleakala	Pan-STARRS 1	·	2.4 km	MPC · JPL
539120	2016 NX_{66}	—	October 20, 2006	Mount Lemmon	Mount Lemmon Survey	·	2.8 km	MPC · JPL
539121	2016 NY_{66}	—	February 20, 2014	Mount Lemmon	Mount Lemmon Survey	·	2.2 km	MPC · JPL
539122	2016 NA_{67}	—	February 28, 2014	Mount Lemmon	Mount Lemmon Survey	·	3.2 km	MPC · JPL
539123	2016 NB_{67}	—	July 11, 2016	Haleakala	Pan-STARRS 1	·	2.4 km	MPC · JPL
539124	2016 NC_{67}	—	September 23, 2011	Kitt Peak	Spacewatch	·	2.4 km	MPC · JPL
539125	2016 NE_{67}	—	December 18, 2007	Mount Lemmon	Mount Lemmon Survey	·	2.7 km	MPC · JPL
539126	2016 NJ_{67}	—	December 13, 2006	Mount Lemmon	Mount Lemmon Survey	·	2.5 km	MPC · JPL
539127	2016 NL_{67}	—	March 24, 2015	Mount Lemmon	Mount Lemmon Survey	PHO	670 m	MPC · JPL
539128	2016 NO_{67}	—	April 24, 2015	Haleakala	Pan-STARRS 1	EOS	1.7 km	MPC · JPL
539129	2016 NP_{67}	—	February 20, 2009	Kitt Peak	Spacewatch	·	2.1 km	MPC · JPL
539130	2016 NQ_{67}	—	March 16, 2007	Catalina	CSS	·	1.8 km	MPC · JPL
539131	2016 NR_{67}	—	August 27, 2011	Haleakala	Pan-STARRS 1	HYG	2.3 km	MPC · JPL
539132	2016 NT_{67}	—	January 29, 2011	Kitt Peak	Spacewatch	V	680 m	MPC · JPL
539133	2016 NY_{67}	—	October 26, 2008	Mount Lemmon	Mount Lemmon Survey	·	1.9 km	MPC · JPL
539134	2016 NZ_{67}	—	May 10, 2007	Mount Lemmon	Mount Lemmon Survey	·	1.3 km	MPC · JPL
539135	2016 NA_{68}	—	September 13, 2007	Mount Lemmon	Mount Lemmon Survey	KOR	1.1 km	MPC · JPL
539136	2016 NB_{68}	—	October 17, 2012	Mount Lemmon	Mount Lemmon Survey	·	1.7 km	MPC · JPL
539137	2016 NF_{68}	—	November 7, 2007	Mount Lemmon	Mount Lemmon Survey	·	4.4 km	MPC · JPL
539138	2016 NG_{68}	—	July 27, 2011	Haleakala	Pan-STARRS 1	EOS	1.6 km	MPC · JPL
539139	2016 NJ_{68}	—	November 11, 2007	Mount Lemmon	Mount Lemmon Survey	·	1.8 km	MPC · JPL
539140	2016 NM_{68}	—	July 7, 2016	Haleakala	Pan-STARRS 1	·	1.7 km	MPC · JPL
539141	2016 NQ_{68}	—	May 26, 2007	Mount Lemmon	Mount Lemmon Survey	·	1.4 km	MPC · JPL
539142	2016 NR_{68}	—	May 26, 2015	Haleakala	Pan-STARRS 1	·	1.8 km	MPC · JPL
539143	2016 NV_{68}	—	December 5, 2008	Mount Lemmon	Mount Lemmon Survey	·	1.6 km	MPC · JPL
539144	2016 NY_{68}	—	January 23, 2014	Mount Lemmon	Mount Lemmon Survey	·	1.6 km	MPC · JPL
539145	2016 NB_{69}	—	October 22, 2012	Mount Lemmon	Mount Lemmon Survey	·	1.7 km	MPC · JPL
539146	2016 ND_{69}	—	September 13, 2007	Catalina	CSS	·	1.5 km	MPC · JPL
539147	2016 NH_{69}	—	December 18, 2007	Mount Lemmon	Mount Lemmon Survey	·	2.2 km	MPC · JPL
539148	2016 NL_{69}	—	February 9, 2008	Mount Lemmon	Mount Lemmon Survey	(31811)	2.8 km	MPC · JPL
539149	2016 NS_{69}	—	February 24, 2014	Haleakala	Pan-STARRS 1	·	2.7 km	MPC · JPL
539150	2016 NT_{69}	—	January 7, 2013	Mount Lemmon	Mount Lemmon Survey	EOS	1.6 km	MPC · JPL
539151	2016 NU_{69}	—	September 18, 2011	Mount Lemmon	Mount Lemmon Survey	EOS	1.4 km	MPC · JPL
539152	2016 NV_{69}	—	May 23, 1998	Kitt Peak	Spacewatch	ADE	2.0 km	MPC · JPL
539153	2016 NY_{69}	—	January 20, 2015	Haleakala	Pan-STARRS 1	·	610 m	MPC · JPL
539154	2016 NZ_{69}	—	September 19, 2011	Haleakala	Pan-STARRS 1	·	2.2 km	MPC · JPL
539155	2016 NA_{70}	—	February 12, 2008	Mount Lemmon	Mount Lemmon Survey	·	3.0 km	MPC · JPL
539156	2016 NB_{70}	—	February 17, 2010	Kitt Peak	Spacewatch	PAD	1.3 km	MPC · JPL
539157	2016 NE_{70}	—	November 2, 2013	Mount Lemmon	Mount Lemmon Survey	·	1.3 km	MPC · JPL
539158	2016 NJ_{70}	—	February 11, 2008	Mount Lemmon	Mount Lemmon Survey	·	2.7 km	MPC · JPL
539159	2016 NK_{70}	—	March 6, 2008	Mount Lemmon	Mount Lemmon Survey	·	2.7 km	MPC · JPL
539160	2016 NL_{70}	—	February 7, 2008	Mount Lemmon	Mount Lemmon Survey	·	2.7 km	MPC · JPL
539161	2016 NM_{70}	—	January 1, 2008	Mount Lemmon	Mount Lemmon Survey	·	3.4 km	MPC · JPL
539162	2016 NP_{70}	—	February 20, 2014	Mount Lemmon	Mount Lemmon Survey	·	1.7 km	MPC · JPL
539163	2016 NE_{71}	—	January 23, 2015	Haleakala	Pan-STARRS 1	·	980 m	MPC · JPL
539164	2016 NZ_{71}	—	October 21, 2012	Mount Lemmon	Mount Lemmon Survey	·	1.4 km	MPC · JPL
539165	2016 NG_{72}	—	January 20, 2015	Haleakala	Pan-STARRS 1	·	1.6 km	MPC · JPL
539166	2016 NP_{72}	—	December 22, 2008	Mount Lemmon	Mount Lemmon Survey	·	1.9 km	MPC · JPL
539167	2016 NQ_{72}	—	February 10, 2014	Haleakala	Pan-STARRS 1	·	1.8 km	MPC · JPL
539168	2016 NT_{72}	—	November 13, 2006	Catalina	CSS	·	2.8 km	MPC · JPL
539169	2016 NU_{72}	—	August 1, 2011	Haleakala	Pan-STARRS 1	·	1.9 km	MPC · JPL
539170	2016 NX_{72}	—	November 14, 2013	Mount Lemmon	Mount Lemmon Survey	·	1.2 km	MPC · JPL
539171	2016 NB_{73}	—	February 26, 2009	Catalina	CSS	·	2.1 km	MPC · JPL
539172	2016 ND_{73}	—	September 21, 2011	Mount Lemmon	Mount Lemmon Survey	·	2.6 km	MPC · JPL
539173	2016 NE_{73}	—	February 25, 2014	Kitt Peak	Spacewatch	·	1.9 km	MPC · JPL
539174	2016 NG_{73}	—	October 9, 2007	Mount Lemmon	Mount Lemmon Survey	KOR	1.1 km	MPC · JPL
539175	2016 NO_{73}	—	September 23, 2012	Kitt Peak	Spacewatch	·	1.7 km	MPC · JPL
539176	2016 NR_{73}	—	November 19, 2008	Kitt Peak	Spacewatch	·	2.3 km	MPC · JPL
539177	2016 NS_{73}	—	November 20, 2003	Kitt Peak	Spacewatch	·	2.3 km	MPC · JPL
539178	2016 NV_{73}	—	October 8, 2012	Haleakala	Pan-STARRS 1	·	1.6 km	MPC · JPL
539179	2016 NW_{73}	—	September 16, 2012	Kitt Peak	Spacewatch	·	1.7 km	MPC · JPL
539180	2016 NY_{73}	—	September 25, 2011	Haleakala	Pan-STARRS 1	·	3.4 km	MPC · JPL
539181	2016 NB_{74}	—	February 12, 2008	Mount Lemmon	Mount Lemmon Survey	·	3.1 km	MPC · JPL
539182	2016 ND_{74}	—	October 20, 2012	Kitt Peak	Spacewatch	·	2.1 km	MPC · JPL
539183	2016 NE_{74}	—	November 30, 2008	Mount Lemmon	Mount Lemmon Survey	·	1.6 km	MPC · JPL
539184	2016 NF_{74}	—	September 4, 2011	Haleakala	Pan-STARRS 1	·	2.9 km	MPC · JPL
539185	2016 NH_{74}	—	September 19, 2003	Kitt Peak	Spacewatch	·	1.3 km	MPC · JPL
539186	2016 NL_{74}	—	September 15, 2012	Catalina	CSS	·	1.2 km	MPC · JPL
539187	2016 NP_{74}	—	November 13, 2012	Mount Lemmon	Mount Lemmon Survey	·	1.6 km	MPC · JPL
539188	2016 NR_{74}	—	October 7, 2012	Haleakala	Pan-STARRS 1	·	1.6 km	MPC · JPL
539189	2016 NS_{74}	—	February 24, 2015	Haleakala	Pan-STARRS 1	·	2.1 km	MPC · JPL
539190	2016 NT_{74}	—	October 20, 2012	Kitt Peak	Spacewatch	·	2.5 km	MPC · JPL
539191	2016 NU_{74}	—	January 11, 2003	Kitt Peak	Spacewatch	EOS	1.8 km	MPC · JPL
539192	2016 ND_{75}	—	January 29, 2015	Haleakala	Pan-STARRS 1	·	1.0 km	MPC · JPL
539193	2016 NS_{75}	—	January 7, 2009	Kitt Peak	Spacewatch	·	1.6 km	MPC · JPL
539194	2016 NH_{76}	—	January 17, 2015	Haleakala	Pan-STARRS 1	·	1.0 km	MPC · JPL
539195	2016 NR_{78}	—	February 24, 2015	Haleakala	Pan-STARRS 1	·	830 m	MPC · JPL
539196	2016 NB_{79}	—	July 5, 2016	Haleakala	Pan-STARRS 1	·	1.6 km	MPC · JPL
539197	2016 NK_{80}	—	August 16, 2012	Tenerife	ESA OGS	·	1.0 km	MPC · JPL
539198	2016 NW_{80}	—	January 25, 2009	Kitt Peak	Spacewatch	·	2.0 km	MPC · JPL
539199	2016 NY_{80}	—	January 1, 2014	Kitt Peak	Spacewatch	BRA	1.2 km	MPC · JPL
539200	2016 NB_{81}	—	February 28, 2014	Mount Lemmon	Mount Lemmon Survey	·	1.7 km	MPC · JPL

== 539201–539300 ==
back to top

Designation			Discovery			Properties		Ref
Permanent	Provisional	Named after	Date	Site	Discoverer(s)	Category	Diam.	Ref
539201	2016 NJ_{81}	—	January 22, 2015	Haleakala	Pan-STARRS 1	EUN	1.2 km	MPC · JPL
539202	2016 NL_{81}	—	July 7, 2016	Mount Lemmon	Mount Lemmon Survey	·	2.1 km	MPC · JPL
539203	2016 NO_{81}	—	April 23, 2015	Haleakala	Pan-STARRS 1	·	1.6 km	MPC · JPL
539204	2016 NR_{81}	—	January 17, 2015	Haleakala	Pan-STARRS 1	NYS	910 m	MPC · JPL
539205	2016 NE_{82}	—	September 19, 2011	Haleakala	Pan-STARRS 1	NAE	3.0 km	MPC · JPL
539206	2016 NG_{82}	—	July 9, 2016	Mount Lemmon	Mount Lemmon Survey	·	2.3 km	MPC · JPL
539207	2016 NQ_{82}	—	January 2, 2014	Mount Lemmon	Mount Lemmon Survey	·	1.4 km	MPC · JPL
539208	2016 NV_{82}	—	April 30, 2011	Mount Lemmon	Mount Lemmon Survey	·	1.5 km	MPC · JPL
539209	2016 NA_{83}	—	July 11, 2016	Haleakala	Pan-STARRS 1	·	2.6 km	MPC · JPL
539210	2016 NK_{83}	—	September 23, 2011	Kitt Peak	Spacewatch	·	2.8 km	MPC · JPL
539211	2016 NX_{83}	—	February 24, 2015	Haleakala	Pan-STARRS 1	CLA	1.0 km	MPC · JPL
539212	2016 NA_{84}	—	December 6, 2012	Mount Lemmon	Mount Lemmon Survey	EOS	1.6 km	MPC · JPL
539213	2016 NK_{84}	—	October 25, 2012	Mount Lemmon	Mount Lemmon Survey	·	1.1 km	MPC · JPL
539214	2016 NM_{84}	—	March 25, 2015	Mount Lemmon	Mount Lemmon Survey	·	1.6 km	MPC · JPL
539215	2016 NP_{84}	—	March 25, 2015	Haleakala	Pan-STARRS 1	·	1.1 km	MPC · JPL
539216	2016 NR_{84}	—	July 11, 2016	Haleakala	Pan-STARRS 1	·	820 m	MPC · JPL
539217	2016 NW_{84}	—	March 20, 2010	Kitt Peak	Spacewatch	AGN	1.1 km	MPC · JPL
539218	2016 NH_{85}	—	April 26, 2011	Kitt Peak	Spacewatch	·	1.3 km	MPC · JPL
539219	2016 NR_{87}	—	June 9, 2011	Kitt Peak	Spacewatch	·	2.8 km	MPC · JPL
539220	2016 NT_{87}	—	August 2, 2011	Haleakala	Pan-STARRS 1	·	2.2 km	MPC · JPL
539221	2016 NX_{87}	—	December 30, 2013	Kitt Peak	Spacewatch	·	2.3 km	MPC · JPL
539222	2016 NQ_{88}	—	August 29, 2005	Kitt Peak	Spacewatch	VER	2.1 km	MPC · JPL
539223	2016 NK_{89}	—	February 1, 2006	Kitt Peak	Spacewatch	·	1.3 km	MPC · JPL
539224	2016 NL_{90}	—	July 5, 2016	Haleakala	Pan-STARRS 1	·	2.7 km	MPC · JPL
539225	2016 NM_{90}	—	July 9, 2016	Haleakala	Pan-STARRS 1	·	2.0 km	MPC · JPL
539226	2016 NO_{90}	—	July 4, 2016	Haleakala	Pan-STARRS 1	·	2.0 km	MPC · JPL
539227	2016 NP_{90}	—	July 7, 2016	Haleakala	Pan-STARRS 1	BRA	1.4 km	MPC · JPL
539228	2016 NQ_{90}	—	January 13, 2002	Socorro	LINEAR	·	3.3 km	MPC · JPL
539229	2016 NR_{90}	—	April 23, 2015	Haleakala	Pan-STARRS 1	·	1.8 km	MPC · JPL
539230	2016 NS_{90}	—	February 26, 2014	Mount Lemmon	Mount Lemmon Survey	·	1.7 km	MPC · JPL
539231	2016 OK_{2}	—	April 23, 2015	Haleakala	Pan-STARRS 1	·	1.8 km	MPC · JPL
539232	2016 OQ_{4}	—	June 30, 1997	Prescott	P. G. Comba	·	1.5 km	MPC · JPL
539233	2016 OZ_{5}	—	October 10, 2012	Haleakala	Pan-STARRS 1	EUN	1.0 km	MPC · JPL
539234	2016 OP_{6}	—	December 27, 2006	Mount Lemmon	Mount Lemmon Survey	·	3.5 km	MPC · JPL
539235	2016 OR_{6}	—	December 15, 2006	Kitt Peak	Spacewatch	URS	3.7 km	MPC · JPL
539236	2016 OA_{7}	—	January 10, 2014	Catalina	CSS	·	2.3 km	MPC · JPL
539237	2016 OB_{7}	—	March 12, 2010	Mount Lemmon	Mount Lemmon Survey	·	1.6 km	MPC · JPL
539238	2016 OH_{7}	—	September 25, 2012	Catalina	CSS	·	1.8 km	MPC · JPL
539239	2016 OR_{7}	—	August 27, 2011	Haleakala	Pan-STARRS 1	·	1.7 km	MPC · JPL
539240	2016 OL_{8}	—	March 30, 2011	Mount Lemmon	Mount Lemmon Survey	MAR	760 m	MPC · JPL
539241	2016 PX_{3}	—	May 19, 2012	Mount Lemmon	Mount Lemmon Survey	·	1.5 km	MPC · JPL
539242	2016 PV_{5}	—	February 8, 2007	Mount Lemmon	Mount Lemmon Survey	·	1.8 km	MPC · JPL
539243	2016 PC_{7}	—	February 16, 2015	Haleakala	Pan-STARRS 1	·	830 m	MPC · JPL
539244	2016 PP_{11}	—	May 14, 2004	Kitt Peak	Spacewatch	T_{j} (2.98)	4.8 km	MPC · JPL
539245	2016 PY_{11}	—	February 3, 2006	Kitt Peak	Spacewatch	·	2.1 km	MPC · JPL
539246	2016 PE_{12}	—	October 19, 2012	Haleakala	Pan-STARRS 1	·	2.0 km	MPC · JPL
539247	2016 PQ_{12}	—	May 31, 2010	WISE	WISE	CYB	4.6 km	MPC · JPL
539248	2016 PV_{12}	—	March 2, 2011	Mount Lemmon	Mount Lemmon Survey	PHO	910 m	MPC · JPL
539249	2016 PB_{14}	—	April 4, 2011	Mount Lemmon	Mount Lemmon Survey	·	1.3 km	MPC · JPL
539250	2016 PL_{24}	—	May 13, 2007	Kitt Peak	Spacewatch	·	1.2 km	MPC · JPL
539251	2016 PB_{29}	—	February 20, 2014	Mount Lemmon	Mount Lemmon Survey	·	2.8 km	MPC · JPL
539252	2016 PR_{30}	—	November 9, 2013	Kitt Peak	Spacewatch	·	650 m	MPC · JPL
539253	2016 PK_{31}	—	November 6, 2008	Catalina	CSS	·	1.3 km	MPC · JPL
539254	2016 PB_{36}	—	January 17, 2015	Haleakala	Pan-STARRS 1	·	930 m	MPC · JPL
539255	2016 PS_{37}	—	June 21, 2007	Mount Lemmon	Mount Lemmon Survey	·	2.3 km	MPC · JPL
539256	2016 PU_{37}	—	October 3, 2013	Kitt Peak	Spacewatch	·	660 m	MPC · JPL
539257	2016 PJ_{50}	—	February 17, 2015	Haleakala	Pan-STARRS 1	MAR	650 m	MPC · JPL
539258	2016 PJ_{51}	—	October 15, 2012	Kitt Peak	Spacewatch	·	2.5 km	MPC · JPL
539259	2016 PR_{55}	—	February 11, 2014	Mount Lemmon	Mount Lemmon Survey	EOS	1.4 km	MPC · JPL
539260	2016 PF_{68}	—	January 30, 2006	Kitt Peak	Spacewatch	·	1.7 km	MPC · JPL
539261	2016 PD_{69}	—	November 19, 2006	Catalina	CSS	EOS	2.1 km	MPC · JPL
539262	2016 PF_{71}	—	August 6, 2016	Haleakala	Pan-STARRS 1	·	1.1 km	MPC · JPL
539263	2016 PJ_{72}	—	November 3, 2007	Catalina	CSS	·	2.3 km	MPC · JPL
539264	2016 PG_{75}	—	October 30, 2008	Kitt Peak	Spacewatch	·	1.5 km	MPC · JPL
539265	2016 PN_{77}	—	August 30, 2005	Kitt Peak	Spacewatch	·	990 m	MPC · JPL
539266	2016 PP_{77}	—	June 9, 2002	Socorro	LINEAR	·	990 m	MPC · JPL
539267	2016 PS_{77}	—	December 17, 2007	Mount Lemmon	Mount Lemmon Survey	·	2.6 km	MPC · JPL
539268	2016 PV_{77}	—	February 9, 2008	Kitt Peak	Spacewatch	·	3.7 km	MPC · JPL
539269	2016 PT_{78}	—	October 19, 2012	Mount Lemmon	Mount Lemmon Survey	BRG	1.5 km	MPC · JPL
539270	2016 PB_{83}	—	August 2, 2016	Haleakala	Pan-STARRS 1	·	1.7 km	MPC · JPL
539271	2016 PA_{84}	—	August 2, 2016	Haleakala	Pan-STARRS 1	·	2.3 km	MPC · JPL
539272	2016 PB_{85}	—	May 18, 2015	Haleakala	Pan-STARRS 1	EOS	1.4 km	MPC · JPL
539273	2016 PX_{85}	—	June 16, 2010	WISE	WISE	CYB	3.1 km	MPC · JPL
539274	2016 PC_{87}	—	October 24, 2005	Kitt Peak	Spacewatch	·	2.7 km	MPC · JPL
539275	2016 PN_{87}	—	September 29, 2005	Mount Lemmon	Mount Lemmon Survey	·	2.2 km	MPC · JPL
539276	2016 PY_{88}	—	February 24, 2006	Kitt Peak	Spacewatch	·	1.6 km	MPC · JPL
539277	2016 PT_{89}	—	February 13, 2010	WISE	WISE	·	2.3 km	MPC · JPL
539278	2016 PW_{89}	—	May 13, 2015	Mount Lemmon	Mount Lemmon Survey	·	910 m	MPC · JPL
539279	2016 PG_{90}	—	January 27, 2011	Mount Lemmon	Mount Lemmon Survey	MAS	670 m	MPC · JPL
539280	2016 PP_{90}	—	September 2, 2010	Mount Lemmon	Mount Lemmon Survey	·	2.4 km	MPC · JPL
539281	2016 PS_{90}	—	October 30, 2005	Mount Lemmon	Mount Lemmon Survey	·	3.3 km	MPC · JPL
539282	2016 PT_{90}	—	October 1, 2005	Mount Lemmon	Mount Lemmon Survey	·	3.2 km	MPC · JPL
539283	2016 PC_{91}	—	May 8, 2006	Mount Lemmon	Mount Lemmon Survey	·	1.7 km	MPC · JPL
539284	2016 PJ_{91}	—	March 25, 2006	Mount Lemmon	Mount Lemmon Survey	·	1.4 km	MPC · JPL
539285	2016 PK_{91}	—	September 30, 2006	Mount Lemmon	Mount Lemmon Survey	·	530 m	MPC · JPL
539286	2016 PS_{91}	—	September 25, 2011	Haleakala	Pan-STARRS 1	·	2.0 km	MPC · JPL
539287	2016 PY_{91}	—	November 2, 2006	Mount Lemmon	Mount Lemmon Survey	·	2.6 km	MPC · JPL
539288	2016 PZ_{91}	—	June 11, 2015	Haleakala	Pan-STARRS 1	·	2.6 km	MPC · JPL
539289	2016 PC_{92}	—	April 25, 2015	Haleakala	Pan-STARRS 1	·	2.3 km	MPC · JPL
539290	2016 PD_{92}	—	February 24, 2014	Haleakala	Pan-STARRS 1	·	2.9 km	MPC · JPL
539291	2016 PE_{92}	—	October 21, 2006	Mount Lemmon	Mount Lemmon Survey	EOS	1.9 km	MPC · JPL
539292	2016 PJ_{92}	—	May 12, 2015	XuYi	PMO NEO Survey Program	·	2.9 km	MPC · JPL
539293	2016 PL_{92}	—	August 24, 2011	Haleakala	Pan-STARRS 1	GEF	1.4 km	MPC · JPL
539294	2016 PM_{92}	—	February 3, 2009	Kitt Peak	Spacewatch	·	1.9 km	MPC · JPL
539295	2016 PO_{92}	—	March 13, 2007	Mount Lemmon	Mount Lemmon Survey	·	1.2 km	MPC · JPL
539296	2016 PP_{92}	—	September 21, 2011	Kitt Peak	Spacewatch	EOS	1.7 km	MPC · JPL
539297	2016 PR_{92}	—	February 16, 2013	Mount Lemmon	Mount Lemmon Survey	·	2.8 km	MPC · JPL
539298	2016 PS_{92}	—	April 8, 2010	Kitt Peak	Spacewatch	AGN	1.2 km	MPC · JPL
539299	2016 PT_{92}	—	September 4, 2007	Mount Lemmon	Mount Lemmon Survey	·	1.8 km	MPC · JPL
539300	2016 PV_{92}	—	October 18, 2012	Haleakala	Pan-STARRS 1	·	1.6 km	MPC · JPL

== 539301–539400 ==
back to top

Designation			Discovery			Properties		Ref
Permanent	Provisional	Named after	Date	Site	Discoverer(s)	Category	Diam.	Ref
539301	2016 PL_{93}	—	September 9, 2007	Mount Lemmon	Mount Lemmon Survey	·	1.6 km	MPC · JPL
539302	2016 PO_{93}	—	February 26, 2014	Mount Lemmon	Mount Lemmon Survey	AGN	1.1 km	MPC · JPL
539303	2016 PR_{93}	—	September 15, 2007	Mount Lemmon	Mount Lemmon Survey	·	1.8 km	MPC · JPL
539304	2016 PS_{93}	—	November 23, 2012	Kitt Peak	Spacewatch	·	1.4 km	MPC · JPL
539305	2016 PA_{94}	—	April 11, 2007	Mount Lemmon	Mount Lemmon Survey	·	910 m	MPC · JPL
539306	2016 PB_{94}	—	April 15, 2007	Mount Lemmon	Mount Lemmon Survey	·	1.0 km	MPC · JPL
539307	2016 PQ_{94}	—	October 5, 2007	Kitt Peak	Spacewatch	HOF	2.3 km	MPC · JPL
539308	2016 PS_{94}	—	September 10, 2007	Mount Lemmon	Mount Lemmon Survey	·	1.3 km	MPC · JPL
539309	2016 PT_{94}	—	September 14, 2007	Mount Lemmon	Mount Lemmon Survey	AST	1.5 km	MPC · JPL
539310	2016 PV_{94}	—	November 19, 2007	Kitt Peak	Spacewatch	·	2.0 km	MPC · JPL
539311	2016 PC_{95}	—	January 20, 2008	Mount Lemmon	Mount Lemmon Survey	·	2.8 km	MPC · JPL
539312	2016 PD_{95}	—	September 13, 2007	Mount Lemmon	Mount Lemmon Survey	WIT	880 m	MPC · JPL
539313	2016 PF_{95}	—	April 20, 2010	Kitt Peak	Spacewatch	AGN	1.2 km	MPC · JPL
539314	2016 PG_{95}	—	February 9, 2008	Mount Lemmon	Mount Lemmon Survey	·	2.9 km	MPC · JPL
539315	2016 PJ_{95}	—	March 29, 2008	Kitt Peak	Spacewatch	·	3.1 km	MPC · JPL
539316	2016 PK_{95}	—	February 1, 2009	Mount Lemmon	Mount Lemmon Survey	·	2.3 km	MPC · JPL
539317	2016 PL_{95}	—	March 1, 2008	Mount Lemmon	Mount Lemmon Survey	EOS	1.7 km	MPC · JPL
539318	2016 PM_{95}	—	January 11, 2008	Mount Lemmon	Mount Lemmon Survey	·	2.0 km	MPC · JPL
539319	2016 PO_{95}	—	January 10, 2008	Mount Lemmon	Mount Lemmon Survey	·	2.5 km	MPC · JPL
539320	2016 PQ_{95}	—	February 28, 2008	Mount Lemmon	Mount Lemmon Survey	·	3.0 km	MPC · JPL
539321	2016 PX_{95}	—	December 18, 2007	Mount Lemmon	Mount Lemmon Survey	·	2.0 km	MPC · JPL
539322	2016 PY_{95}	—	January 20, 2013	Kitt Peak	Spacewatch	·	3.2 km	MPC · JPL
539323	2016 PB_{96}	—	December 17, 2007	Mount Lemmon	Mount Lemmon Survey	EOS	1.9 km	MPC · JPL
539324	2016 PE_{96}	—	January 17, 2008	Mount Lemmon	Mount Lemmon Survey	·	2.9 km	MPC · JPL
539325	2016 PH_{96}	—	August 10, 2016	Haleakala	Pan-STARRS 1	·	1.6 km	MPC · JPL
539326	2016 PJ_{96}	—	March 10, 2014	Kitt Peak	Spacewatch	·	4.0 km	MPC · JPL
539327	2016 PK_{96}	—	October 3, 1999	Kitt Peak	Spacewatch	·	2.8 km	MPC · JPL
539328	2016 PM_{96}	—	August 28, 2005	Kitt Peak	Spacewatch	·	1.0 km	MPC · JPL
539329	2016 PO_{96}	—	October 10, 2007	Mount Lemmon	Mount Lemmon Survey	AGN	970 m	MPC · JPL
539330	2016 PQ_{96}	—	October 24, 2011	Haleakala	Pan-STARRS 1	·	2.6 km	MPC · JPL
539331	2016 PD_{97}	—	October 8, 2008	Mount Lemmon	Mount Lemmon Survey	·	1.5 km	MPC · JPL
539332	2016 PG_{97}	—	March 30, 2015	Haleakala	Pan-STARRS 1	·	1.1 km	MPC · JPL
539333	2016 PU_{97}	—	October 6, 2008	Mount Lemmon	Mount Lemmon Survey	MAR	810 m	MPC · JPL
539334	2016 PW_{97}	—	September 6, 2008	Mount Lemmon	Mount Lemmon Survey	·	1.3 km	MPC · JPL
539335	2016 PY_{97}	—	January 1, 2014	Kitt Peak	Spacewatch	·	1.8 km	MPC · JPL
539336	2016 PL_{98}	—	April 5, 2011	Kitt Peak	Spacewatch	·	800 m	MPC · JPL
539337	2016 PO_{98}	—	October 9, 2008	Mount Lemmon	Mount Lemmon Survey	·	1.4 km	MPC · JPL
539338	2016 PV_{98}	—	November 17, 1999	Kitt Peak	Spacewatch	·	1.4 km	MPC · JPL
539339	2016 PM_{99}	—	January 18, 2009	Mount Lemmon	Mount Lemmon Survey	AGN	990 m	MPC · JPL
539340	2016 PN_{99}	—	October 21, 2012	Kitt Peak	Spacewatch	·	1.5 km	MPC · JPL
539341	2016 PV_{99}	—	October 1, 2011	Kitt Peak	Spacewatch	·	3.4 km	MPC · JPL
539342	2016 PW_{99}	—	September 20, 2011	Haleakala	Pan-STARRS 1	·	1.5 km	MPC · JPL
539343	2016 PX_{99}	—	January 20, 2015	Haleakala	Pan-STARRS 1	·	950 m	MPC · JPL
539344	2016 PY_{99}	—	May 3, 2008	Mount Lemmon	Mount Lemmon Survey	PHO	680 m	MPC · JPL
539345	2016 PD_{100}	—	August 27, 2011	Haleakala	Pan-STARRS 1	·	1.7 km	MPC · JPL
539346	2016 PJ_{100}	—	March 15, 2010	Mount Lemmon	Mount Lemmon Survey	(12739)	1.5 km	MPC · JPL
539347	2016 PM_{100}	—	December 31, 2013	Mount Lemmon	Mount Lemmon Survey	·	1.6 km	MPC · JPL
539348	2016 PN_{100}	—	October 7, 2008	Mount Lemmon	Mount Lemmon Survey	·	1.3 km	MPC · JPL
539349	2016 PR_{100}	—	September 11, 2007	Mount Lemmon	Mount Lemmon Survey	·	1.6 km	MPC · JPL
539350	2016 PS_{100}	—	August 10, 2007	Kitt Peak	Spacewatch	(17392)	1.5 km	MPC · JPL
539351	2016 PT_{100}	—	November 14, 2007	Kitt Peak	Spacewatch	·	1.9 km	MPC · JPL
539352	2016 PU_{100}	—	September 10, 2007	Mount Lemmon	Mount Lemmon Survey	·	2.0 km	MPC · JPL
539353	2016 PW_{100}	—	September 1, 2005	Kitt Peak	Spacewatch	·	2.5 km	MPC · JPL
539354	2016 PZ_{100}	—	August 24, 2007	Kitt Peak	Spacewatch	·	1.6 km	MPC · JPL
539355	2016 PC_{101}	—	September 19, 2003	Kitt Peak	Spacewatch	ADE	2.2 km	MPC · JPL
539356	2016 PD_{101}	—	September 18, 2003	Kitt Peak	Spacewatch	·	1.5 km	MPC · JPL
539357	2016 PL_{101}	—	March 21, 2002	Kitt Peak	Spacewatch	MAR	1.1 km	MPC · JPL
539358	2016 PM_{101}	—	September 16, 2003	Kitt Peak	Spacewatch	·	1.2 km	MPC · JPL
539359	2016 PN_{101}	—	August 10, 2007	Kitt Peak	Spacewatch	·	1.3 km	MPC · JPL
539360	2016 PP_{101}	—	September 12, 2007	Mount Lemmon	Mount Lemmon Survey	·	1.5 km	MPC · JPL
539361	2016 PU_{101}	—	February 17, 2010	Kitt Peak	Spacewatch	·	1.2 km	MPC · JPL
539362	2016 PY_{101}	—	November 23, 2012	Kitt Peak	Spacewatch	·	1.2 km	MPC · JPL
539363	2016 PC_{102}	—	January 25, 2007	Kitt Peak	Spacewatch	VER	3.0 km	MPC · JPL
539364	2016 PG_{102}	—	September 21, 2003	Kitt Peak	Spacewatch	·	1.5 km	MPC · JPL
539365	2016 PH_{102}	—	February 26, 2014	Mount Lemmon	Mount Lemmon Survey	·	2.2 km	MPC · JPL
539366	2016 PK_{102}	—	December 22, 2012	Haleakala	Pan-STARRS 1	EOS	1.7 km	MPC · JPL
539367	2016 PL_{102}	—	November 14, 2007	Kitt Peak	Spacewatch	·	2.0 km	MPC · JPL
539368	2016 PP_{102}	—	October 20, 2012	Haleakala	Pan-STARRS 1	·	2.1 km	MPC · JPL
539369	2016 PQ_{102}	—	September 16, 2012	Mount Lemmon	Mount Lemmon Survey	·	1.2 km	MPC · JPL
539370	2016 PT_{102}	—	October 11, 2007	Mount Lemmon	Mount Lemmon Survey	·	1.7 km	MPC · JPL
539371	2016 PU_{102}	—	October 21, 2003	Kitt Peak	Spacewatch	·	1.5 km	MPC · JPL
539372	2016 PW_{102}	—	May 21, 2006	Kitt Peak	Spacewatch	·	1.6 km	MPC · JPL
539373	2016 PX_{102}	—	November 12, 2007	Mount Lemmon	Mount Lemmon Survey	·	2.2 km	MPC · JPL
539374	2016 PZ_{102}	—	April 26, 2007	Kitt Peak	Spacewatch	·	880 m	MPC · JPL
539375	2016 PB_{103}	—	September 11, 2005	Kitt Peak	Spacewatch	·	2.7 km	MPC · JPL
539376	2016 PH_{103}	—	March 24, 2015	Mount Lemmon	Mount Lemmon Survey	·	1.2 km	MPC · JPL
539377	2016 PK_{103}	—	September 19, 2008	Kitt Peak	Spacewatch	MAR	780 m	MPC · JPL
539378	2016 PL_{103}	—	December 4, 2008	Mount Lemmon	Mount Lemmon Survey	·	1.9 km	MPC · JPL
539379	2016 PQ_{103}	—	April 30, 2003	Kitt Peak	Spacewatch	RAF	620 m	MPC · JPL
539380	2016 PR_{103}	—	February 6, 2013	Catalina	CSS	·	3.6 km	MPC · JPL
539381	2016 PD_{104}	—	August 26, 2012	Haleakala	Pan-STARRS 1	·	1.3 km	MPC · JPL
539382	2016 PX_{105}	—	December 12, 2012	Mount Lemmon	Mount Lemmon Survey	BRA	1.2 km	MPC · JPL
539383	2016 PC_{106}	—	December 23, 2012	Haleakala	Pan-STARRS 1	·	2.1 km	MPC · JPL
539384	2016 PD_{106}	—	March 21, 2015	Haleakala	Pan-STARRS 1	·	1.5 km	MPC · JPL
539385	2016 PF_{106}	—	October 17, 2012	Haleakala	Pan-STARRS 1	·	1.4 km	MPC · JPL
539386	2016 PQ_{106}	—	June 2, 2016	Mount Lemmon	Mount Lemmon Survey	·	3.7 km	MPC · JPL
539387	2016 PX_{106}	—	September 12, 2007	Kitt Peak	Spacewatch	·	1.7 km	MPC · JPL
539388	2016 PA_{107}	—	August 2, 2016	Haleakala	Pan-STARRS 1	·	2.7 km	MPC · JPL
539389	2016 PC_{110}	—	January 30, 2011	Haleakala	Pan-STARRS 1	·	1.2 km	MPC · JPL
539390	2016 PN_{110}	—	September 23, 2008	Mount Lemmon	Mount Lemmon Survey	·	890 m	MPC · JPL
539391	2016 PO_{110}	—	October 9, 2012	Mount Lemmon	Mount Lemmon Survey	·	1.5 km	MPC · JPL
539392	2016 PV_{110}	—	April 27, 2009	Mount Lemmon	Mount Lemmon Survey	·	2.3 km	MPC · JPL
539393	2016 PB_{111}	—	February 9, 2008	Kitt Peak	Spacewatch	·	2.6 km	MPC · JPL
539394	2016 PK_{111}	—	September 21, 2011	Kitt Peak	Spacewatch	·	2.8 km	MPC · JPL
539395	2016 PN_{111}	—	February 13, 2008	Mount Lemmon	Mount Lemmon Survey	URS	3.0 km	MPC · JPL
539396	2016 PV_{111}	—	August 2, 2016	Haleakala	Pan-STARRS 1	·	1.2 km	MPC · JPL
539397	2016 PB_{112}	—	February 28, 2014	Haleakala	Pan-STARRS 1	·	1.9 km	MPC · JPL
539398	2016 PT_{113}	—	May 29, 2011	Mount Lemmon	Mount Lemmon Survey	·	1.5 km	MPC · JPL
539399	2016 PU_{113}	—	October 19, 2011	Kitt Peak	Spacewatch	·	2.8 km	MPC · JPL
539400	2016 PA_{114}	—	March 23, 2006	Kitt Peak	Spacewatch	EUN	1.2 km	MPC · JPL

== 539401–539500 ==
back to top

Designation			Discovery			Properties		Ref
Permanent	Provisional	Named after	Date	Site	Discoverer(s)	Category	Diam.	Ref
539401	2016 PJ_{114}	—	September 23, 2011	Haleakala	Pan-STARRS 1	·	2.1 km	MPC · JPL
539402	2016 PL_{114}	—	April 25, 2015	Haleakala	Pan-STARRS 1	·	1.5 km	MPC · JPL
539403	2016 PA_{115}	—	October 21, 2012	Haleakala	Pan-STARRS 1	·	1.4 km	MPC · JPL
539404	2016 PG_{116}	—	September 18, 2011	Mount Lemmon	Mount Lemmon Survey	EOS	1.5 km	MPC · JPL
539405	2016 PC_{117}	—	July 18, 2007	Mount Lemmon	Mount Lemmon Survey	NEM	2.0 km	MPC · JPL
539406	2016 PG_{117}	—	September 6, 2008	Mount Lemmon	Mount Lemmon Survey	·	1.0 km	MPC · JPL
539407	2016 PK_{117}	—	September 10, 2007	Kitt Peak	Spacewatch	·	1.8 km	MPC · JPL
539408	2016 PZ_{117}	—	February 24, 2014	Haleakala	Pan-STARRS 1	·	2.2 km	MPC · JPL
539409	2016 PG_{118}	—	November 26, 2012	Mount Lemmon	Mount Lemmon Survey	·	1.6 km	MPC · JPL
539410	2016 PP_{120}	—	May 22, 2011	Mount Lemmon	Mount Lemmon Survey	·	1.3 km	MPC · JPL
539411	2016 PU_{120}	—	January 20, 2015	Haleakala	Pan-STARRS 1	·	1.6 km	MPC · JPL
539412	2016 PX_{120}	—	April 19, 2004	Kitt Peak	Spacewatch	·	920 m	MPC · JPL
539413	2016 PC_{121}	—	September 18, 2011	Mount Lemmon	Mount Lemmon Survey	·	1.6 km	MPC · JPL
539414	2016 PD_{121}	—	October 11, 2012	Haleakala	Pan-STARRS 1	·	1.6 km	MPC · JPL
539415	2016 PH_{122}	—	April 30, 2006	Kitt Peak	Spacewatch	·	1.4 km	MPC · JPL
539416	2016 PV_{122}	—	April 21, 2014	Mount Lemmon	Mount Lemmon Survey	·	2.0 km	MPC · JPL
539417	2016 PZ_{122}	—	October 24, 2011	Haleakala	Pan-STARRS 1	·	2.3 km	MPC · JPL
539418	2016 PA_{123}	—	October 10, 2012	Haleakala	Pan-STARRS 1	·	1.6 km	MPC · JPL
539419	2016 PK_{123}	—	September 19, 2010	Kitt Peak	Spacewatch	·	2.9 km	MPC · JPL
539420	2016 PP_{123}	—	November 16, 2011	Mount Lemmon	Mount Lemmon Survey	·	1.4 km	MPC · JPL
539421	2016 PT_{123}	—	October 10, 2007	Mount Lemmon	Mount Lemmon Survey	·	1.8 km	MPC · JPL
539422	2016 PA_{124}	—	October 22, 2012	Kitt Peak	Spacewatch	·	1.3 km	MPC · JPL
539423	2016 PJ_{124}	—	March 19, 2013	Haleakala	Pan-STARRS 1	·	2.6 km	MPC · JPL
539424	2016 PN_{124}	—	August 29, 2006	Kitt Peak	Spacewatch	BRA	1.4 km	MPC · JPL
539425	2016 PT_{124}	—	August 28, 2005	Kitt Peak	Spacewatch	·	2.2 km	MPC · JPL
539426	2016 PU_{124}	—	February 25, 2006	Kitt Peak	Spacewatch	·	1.3 km	MPC · JPL
539427	2016 PE_{125}	—	February 28, 2014	Haleakala	Pan-STARRS 1	EOS	1.7 km	MPC · JPL
539428	2016 PM_{125}	—	December 31, 2013	Kitt Peak	Spacewatch	·	1.6 km	MPC · JPL
539429	2016 PS_{125}	—	April 28, 2011	Kitt Peak	Spacewatch	·	1.1 km	MPC · JPL
539430	2016 PG_{126}	—	March 18, 2010	Mount Lemmon	Mount Lemmon Survey	·	1.7 km	MPC · JPL
539431	2016 PM_{126}	—	October 8, 2012	Kitt Peak	Spacewatch	·	1.2 km	MPC · JPL
539432	2016 PV_{126}	—	September 11, 2007	Kitt Peak	Spacewatch	·	1.7 km	MPC · JPL
539433	2016 PC_{127}	—	March 8, 2013	Haleakala	Pan-STARRS 1	·	2.7 km	MPC · JPL
539434	2016 PR_{127}	—	November 6, 2008	Kitt Peak	Spacewatch	·	1.4 km	MPC · JPL
539435	2016 PS_{127}	—	January 11, 2008	Kitt Peak	Spacewatch	·	2.6 km	MPC · JPL
539436	2016 PU_{127}	—	August 1, 2016	Haleakala	Pan-STARRS 1	·	1.9 km	MPC · JPL
539437	2016 PD_{128}	—	August 1, 2016	Haleakala	Pan-STARRS 1	EUN	1.0 km	MPC · JPL
539438	2016 PH_{128}	—	February 28, 2014	Haleakala	Pan-STARRS 1	·	1.8 km	MPC · JPL
539439	2016 QG_{4}	—	October 15, 2012	Haleakala	Pan-STARRS 1	·	1.5 km	MPC · JPL
539440	2016 QR_{4}	—	September 17, 2003	Kitt Peak	Spacewatch	·	2.3 km	MPC · JPL
539441	2016 QA_{5}	—	May 8, 2008	Kitt Peak	Spacewatch	·	1.0 km	MPC · JPL
539442	2016 QC_{5}	—	May 1, 2012	Mount Lemmon	Mount Lemmon Survey	·	670 m	MPC · JPL
539443	2016 QA_{6}	—	September 15, 2006	Kitt Peak	Spacewatch	·	2.0 km	MPC · JPL
539444	2016 QK_{7}	—	January 16, 2011	Mount Lemmon	Mount Lemmon Survey	·	830 m	MPC · JPL
539445	2016 QX_{8}	—	April 24, 2007	Mount Lemmon	Mount Lemmon Survey	·	1.7 km	MPC · JPL
539446	2016 QG_{9}	—	October 31, 2008	Kitt Peak	Spacewatch	·	1.7 km	MPC · JPL
539447	2016 QS_{9}	—	July 3, 2003	Kitt Peak	Spacewatch	EUN	1.2 km	MPC · JPL
539448	2016 QX_{9}	—	February 3, 2013	Haleakala	Pan-STARRS 1	·	3.2 km	MPC · JPL
539449	2016 QU_{11}	—	January 18, 2009	Kitt Peak	Spacewatch	·	1.4 km	MPC · JPL
539450	2016 QV_{13}	—	September 19, 2012	Mount Lemmon	Mount Lemmon Survey	·	1.5 km	MPC · JPL
539451	2016 QY_{14}	—	April 24, 2010	WISE	WISE	EUP	3.9 km	MPC · JPL
539452	2016 QE_{16}	—	October 1, 2011	Kitt Peak	Spacewatch	VER	2.7 km	MPC · JPL
539453	2016 QG_{19}	—	October 11, 2012	Haleakala	Pan-STARRS 1	·	2.3 km	MPC · JPL
539454	2016 QP_{19}	—	August 30, 2011	Haleakala	Pan-STARRS 1	·	2.0 km	MPC · JPL
539455	2016 QS_{19}	—	September 19, 2011	Haleakala	Pan-STARRS 1	EOS	1.9 km	MPC · JPL
539456	2016 QZ_{19}	—	October 24, 2007	Mount Lemmon	Mount Lemmon Survey	·	2.1 km	MPC · JPL
539457	2016 QK_{22}	—	June 10, 2005	Kitt Peak	Spacewatch	·	690 m	MPC · JPL
539458	2016 QN_{26}	—	September 11, 2007	Catalina	CSS	·	2.0 km	MPC · JPL
539459	2016 QK_{27}	—	August 26, 2016	Haleakala	Pan-STARRS 1	·	2.7 km	MPC · JPL
539460	2016 QR_{27}	—	September 4, 2011	Haleakala	Pan-STARRS 1	·	2.2 km	MPC · JPL
539461	2016 QD_{31}	—	September 25, 2008	Kitt Peak	Spacewatch	·	990 m	MPC · JPL
539462	2016 QG_{32}	—	October 8, 2008	Kitt Peak	Spacewatch	(5)	1.1 km	MPC · JPL
539463	2016 QX_{35}	—	February 23, 2007	Mount Lemmon	Mount Lemmon Survey	·	1.7 km	MPC · JPL
539464	2016 QF_{37}	—	September 30, 2005	Mount Lemmon	Mount Lemmon Survey	·	1.3 km	MPC · JPL
539465	2016 QX_{39}	—	December 17, 2001	Kitt Peak	Deep Lens Survey	BRG	1.6 km	MPC · JPL
539466	2016 QQ_{41}	—	May 29, 2011	Kitt Peak	Spacewatch	EUN	910 m	MPC · JPL
539467	2016 QA_{42}	—	February 8, 2008	Kitt Peak	Spacewatch	·	1.2 km	MPC · JPL
539468	2016 QS_{42}	—	January 12, 2008	Kitt Peak	Spacewatch	·	2.9 km	MPC · JPL
539469	2016 QT_{46}	—	October 1, 2003	Kitt Peak	Spacewatch	·	1.8 km	MPC · JPL
539470	2016 QC_{47}	—	February 16, 2010	Mount Lemmon	Mount Lemmon Survey	·	2.7 km	MPC · JPL
539471	2016 QF_{47}	—	October 2, 2006	Mount Lemmon	Mount Lemmon Survey	·	540 m	MPC · JPL
539472	2016 QA_{50}	—	February 13, 2010	Catalina	CSS	·	1.9 km	MPC · JPL
539473	2016 QU_{50}	—	August 25, 2012	Haleakala	Pan-STARRS 1	·	1.2 km	MPC · JPL
539474	2016 QC_{51}	—	October 4, 2007	Mount Lemmon	Mount Lemmon Survey	·	1.8 km	MPC · JPL
539475	2016 QG_{55}	—	June 16, 2009	Mount Lemmon	Mount Lemmon Survey	·	720 m	MPC · JPL
539476	2016 QS_{55}	—	July 1, 2011	Kitt Peak	Spacewatch	BRA	1.3 km	MPC · JPL
539477	2016 QX_{56}	—	April 29, 2008	Mount Lemmon	Mount Lemmon Survey	·	1.4 km	MPC · JPL
539478	2016 QL_{57}	—	June 6, 2015	Haleakala	Pan-STARRS 1	·	2.5 km	MPC · JPL
539479	2016 QS_{57}	—	April 19, 1998	Kitt Peak	Spacewatch	EUN	940 m	MPC · JPL
539480	2016 QL_{58}	—	July 11, 2016	Haleakala	Pan-STARRS 1	·	2.5 km	MPC · JPL
539481	2016 QY_{64}	—	May 12, 2012	Haleakala	Pan-STARRS 1	·	760 m	MPC · JPL
539482	2016 QT_{65}	—	July 11, 2016	Haleakala	Pan-STARRS 1	·	2.2 km	MPC · JPL
539483	2016 QP_{66}	—	November 19, 2003	Kitt Peak	Spacewatch	·	1.6 km	MPC · JPL
539484	2016 QL_{68}	—	October 22, 2012	Mount Lemmon	Mount Lemmon Survey	·	1.7 km	MPC · JPL
539485	2016 QL_{72}	—	October 9, 1999	Kitt Peak	Spacewatch	·	1.3 km	MPC · JPL
539486	2016 QS_{72}	—	March 4, 2006	Kitt Peak	Spacewatch	·	1.5 km	MPC · JPL
539487	2016 QX_{72}	—	January 20, 2009	Mount Lemmon	Mount Lemmon Survey	·	4.0 km	MPC · JPL
539488	2016 QD_{73}	—	August 28, 2016	Mount Lemmon	Mount Lemmon Survey	·	2.5 km	MPC · JPL
539489	2016 QV_{75}	—	August 2, 2016	Haleakala	Pan-STARRS 1	BRA	1.4 km	MPC · JPL
539490	2016 QX_{75}	—	January 20, 2015	Haleakala	Pan-STARRS 1	·	1.3 km	MPC · JPL
539491	2016 QG_{76}	—	January 6, 2006	Mount Lemmon	Mount Lemmon Survey	·	1.8 km	MPC · JPL
539492	2016 QL_{77}	—	December 9, 2004	Kitt Peak	Spacewatch	EUN	1.8 km	MPC · JPL
539493	2016 QK_{79}	—	April 18, 2015	Haleakala	Pan-STARRS 1	·	2.0 km	MPC · JPL
539494	2016 QM_{79}	—	January 13, 2010	WISE	WISE	·	3.2 km	MPC · JPL
539495	2016 QQ_{82}	—	November 6, 2008	Mount Lemmon	Mount Lemmon Survey	·	1.7 km	MPC · JPL
539496	2016 QK_{84}	—	March 26, 2008	Kitt Peak	Spacewatch	·	1.4 km	MPC · JPL
539497	2016 QK_{85}	—	March 1, 2008	Kitt Peak	Spacewatch	VER	3.0 km	MPC · JPL
539498	2016 QH_{86}	—	August 16, 2016	Haleakala	Pan-STARRS 1	·	3.3 km	MPC · JPL
539499	2016 QT_{87}	—	August 28, 2011	Haleakala	Pan-STARRS 1	·	1.8 km	MPC · JPL
539500	2016 QW_{87}	—	September 23, 2008	Kitt Peak	Spacewatch	·	1.1 km	MPC · JPL

== 539501–539600 ==
back to top

Designation			Discovery			Properties		Ref
Permanent	Provisional	Named after	Date	Site	Discoverer(s)	Category	Diam.	Ref
539501	2016 QL_{88}	—	March 8, 2008	Mount Lemmon	Mount Lemmon Survey	·	3.0 km	MPC · JPL
539502	2016 QU_{88}	—	March 13, 2010	Mount Lemmon	Mount Lemmon Survey	·	1.4 km	MPC · JPL
539503	2016 QW_{88}	—	July 3, 2010	WISE	WISE	DOR	2.4 km	MPC · JPL
539504	2016 QY_{88}	—	September 4, 2007	Mount Lemmon	Mount Lemmon Survey	(29841)	1.1 km	MPC · JPL
539505	2016 QA_{89}	—	April 6, 2008	Mount Lemmon	Mount Lemmon Survey	VER	2.2 km	MPC · JPL
539506	2016 QB_{89}	—	November 15, 2011	Mount Lemmon	Mount Lemmon Survey	EOS	1.9 km	MPC · JPL
539507	2016 QD_{89}	—	September 23, 2011	Kitt Peak	Spacewatch	EOS	1.9 km	MPC · JPL
539508	2016 QE_{89}	—	April 19, 2009	Mount Lemmon	Mount Lemmon Survey	·	3.5 km	MPC · JPL
539509	2016 QH_{89}	—	January 18, 2008	Mount Lemmon	Mount Lemmon Survey	·	1.9 km	MPC · JPL
539510	2016 QN_{89}	—	December 25, 2013	Mount Lemmon	Mount Lemmon Survey	·	1.4 km	MPC · JPL
539511	2016 QA_{90}	—	September 18, 2006	Kitt Peak	Spacewatch	·	1.7 km	MPC · JPL
539512	2016 QD_{90}	—	December 22, 2012	Haleakala	Pan-STARRS 1	·	2.5 km	MPC · JPL
539513	2016 QG_{90}	—	September 29, 2003	Kitt Peak	Spacewatch	EUN	1.3 km	MPC · JPL
539514	2016 QJ_{90}	—	September 28, 2006	Kitt Peak	Spacewatch	·	3.4 km	MPC · JPL
539515	2016 QO_{90}	—	September 14, 2007	Mount Lemmon	Mount Lemmon Survey	·	1.5 km	MPC · JPL
539516	2016 QL_{91}	—	September 14, 2007	Catalina	CSS	·	1.7 km	MPC · JPL
539517	2016 QQ_{91}	—	October 9, 2008	Kitt Peak	Spacewatch	·	1.1 km	MPC · JPL
539518	2016 QX_{91}	—	October 19, 2006	Kitt Peak	Spacewatch	EOS	1.5 km	MPC · JPL
539519	2016 QY_{91}	—	April 23, 2014	Cerro Tololo	DECam	·	2.4 km	MPC · JPL
539520	2016 QJ_{92}	—	October 9, 2007	Kitt Peak	Spacewatch	AGN	1.2 km	MPC · JPL
539521	2016 QK_{92}	—	August 27, 2016	Haleakala	Pan-STARRS 1	·	1.7 km	MPC · JPL
539522	2016 QM_{92}	—	December 8, 2012	Kitt Peak	Spacewatch	NAE	2.5 km	MPC · JPL
539523	2016 QN_{92}	—	September 29, 2005	Mount Lemmon	Mount Lemmon Survey	·	2.7 km	MPC · JPL
539524	2016 QQ_{92}	—	February 10, 2014	Haleakala	Pan-STARRS 1	·	2.2 km	MPC · JPL
539525	2016 QV_{92}	—	April 4, 2014	Haleakala	Pan-STARRS 1	·	2.5 km	MPC · JPL
539526	2016 QY_{92}	—	September 21, 2011	Kitt Peak	Spacewatch	·	2.2 km	MPC · JPL
539527	2016 QG_{94}	—	August 30, 2016	Haleakala	Pan-STARRS 1	·	2.6 km	MPC · JPL
539528	2016 QU_{94}	—	August 15, 2016	Haleakala	Pan-STARRS 1	·	3.3 km	MPC · JPL
539529	2016 QX_{94}	—	July 5, 2010	Kitt Peak	Spacewatch	·	2.9 km	MPC · JPL
539530	2016 QY_{94}	—	October 22, 2012	Haleakala	Pan-STARRS 1	·	1.5 km	MPC · JPL
539531	2016 QB_{95}	—	October 22, 2011	Mount Lemmon	Mount Lemmon Survey	·	3.0 km	MPC · JPL
539532	2016 RY_{1}	—	February 28, 2008	Kitt Peak	Spacewatch	·	3.3 km	MPC · JPL
539533	2016 RY_{3}	—	January 1, 2008	Mount Lemmon	Mount Lemmon Survey	·	3.6 km	MPC · JPL
539534	2016 RA_{5}	—	September 23, 2008	Kitt Peak	Spacewatch	·	930 m	MPC · JPL
539535	2016 RQ_{6}	—	December 30, 2007	Mount Lemmon	Mount Lemmon Survey	·	3.0 km	MPC · JPL
539536	2016 RF_{7}	—	September 18, 2011	Mount Lemmon	Mount Lemmon Survey	·	2.6 km	MPC · JPL
539537	2016 RV_{8}	—	March 9, 2008	Mount Lemmon	Mount Lemmon Survey	VER	2.7 km	MPC · JPL
539538	2016 RL_{9}	—	February 27, 2012	Haleakala	Pan-STARRS 1	·	600 m	MPC · JPL
539539	2016 RZ_{9}	—	September 19, 2003	Kitt Peak	Spacewatch	·	930 m	MPC · JPL
539540	2016 RN_{11}	—	January 13, 2013	Catalina	CSS	·	2.4 km	MPC · JPL
539541	2016 RE_{13}	—	September 26, 2011	Mount Lemmon	Mount Lemmon Survey	·	2.0 km	MPC · JPL
539542	2016 RH_{14}	—	January 30, 2009	Mount Lemmon	Mount Lemmon Survey	·	2.3 km	MPC · JPL
539543	2016 RA_{21}	—	October 10, 2012	Kitt Peak	Spacewatch	·	1.4 km	MPC · JPL
539544	2016 RG_{22}	—	May 20, 2012	Mount Lemmon	Mount Lemmon Survey	·	930 m	MPC · JPL
539545	2016 RL_{22}	—	February 9, 2008	Kitt Peak	Spacewatch	·	910 m	MPC · JPL
539546	2016 RD_{25}	—	December 22, 2012	Haleakala	Pan-STARRS 1	·	2.6 km	MPC · JPL
539547	2016 RK_{25}	—	April 20, 2009	Kitt Peak	Spacewatch	·	3.0 km	MPC · JPL
539548	2016 RW_{25}	—	December 11, 2001	Socorro	LINEAR	EOS	1.8 km	MPC · JPL
539549	2016 RZ_{25}	—	February 3, 2000	Kitt Peak	Spacewatch	·	1.9 km	MPC · JPL
539550	2016 RH_{26}	—	April 2, 2005	Kitt Peak	Spacewatch	·	2.5 km	MPC · JPL
539551	2016 RR_{26}	—	April 7, 2014	Mount Lemmon	Mount Lemmon Survey	VER	2.5 km	MPC · JPL
539552	2016 RK_{27}	—	February 20, 2014	Mount Lemmon	Mount Lemmon Survey	·	2.1 km	MPC · JPL
539553	2016 RJ_{28}	—	March 14, 2010	Mount Lemmon	Mount Lemmon Survey	·	1.9 km	MPC · JPL
539554	2016 RQ_{30}	—	August 30, 2005	Kitt Peak	Spacewatch	·	2.7 km	MPC · JPL
539555	2016 RZ_{32}	—	December 1, 2008	Mount Lemmon	Mount Lemmon Survey	EUN	1.3 km	MPC · JPL
539556	2016 RN_{33}	—	March 15, 2007	Kitt Peak	Spacewatch	·	870 m	MPC · JPL
539557	2016 RV_{34}	—	March 8, 2008	Kitt Peak	Spacewatch	·	2.8 km	MPC · JPL
539558	2016 RK_{35}	—	March 7, 2008	Mount Lemmon	Mount Lemmon Survey	·	2.5 km	MPC · JPL
539559	2016 RR_{37}	—	October 1, 2005	Anderson Mesa	LONEOS	PHO	840 m	MPC · JPL
539560	2016 RV_{37}	—	September 24, 2011	Haleakala	Pan-STARRS 1	·	2.3 km	MPC · JPL
539561	2016 RW_{39}	—	June 9, 2012	Mount Lemmon	Mount Lemmon Survey	·	950 m	MPC · JPL
539562	2016 RM_{44}	—	September 26, 2005	Kitt Peak	Spacewatch	·	2.6 km	MPC · JPL
539563	2016 RH_{45}	—	November 14, 2001	Kitt Peak	Spacewatch	·	2.2 km	MPC · JPL
539564	2016 RM_{45}	—	December 13, 2006	Mount Lemmon	Mount Lemmon Survey	EOS	2.1 km	MPC · JPL
539565	2016 RO_{45}	—	September 29, 2003	Kitt Peak	Spacewatch	·	1.4 km	MPC · JPL
539566	2016 RU_{45}	—	February 28, 2014	Haleakala	Pan-STARRS 1	·	1.6 km	MPC · JPL
539567	2016 RV_{45}	—	January 10, 2014	Haleakala	Pan-STARRS 1	·	2.4 km	MPC · JPL
539568	2016 RX_{45}	—	December 31, 2007	Mount Lemmon	Mount Lemmon Survey	·	3.3 km	MPC · JPL
539569	2016 RA_{46}	—	March 25, 2014	Catalina	CSS	·	2.4 km	MPC · JPL
539570	2016 RM_{46}	—	April 2, 2009	Mount Lemmon	Mount Lemmon Survey	·	3.1 km	MPC · JPL
539571	2016 RT_{46}	—	November 3, 2007	Mount Lemmon	Mount Lemmon Survey	·	2.6 km	MPC · JPL
539572	2016 RY_{46}	—	February 8, 2013	Kitt Peak	Spacewatch	URS	2.9 km	MPC · JPL
539573	2016 RZ_{46}	—	September 6, 2016	Haleakala	Pan-STARRS 1	·	1.7 km	MPC · JPL
539574	2016 RA_{47}	—	October 29, 2003	Kitt Peak	Spacewatch	·	1.8 km	MPC · JPL
539575	2016 RB_{47}	—	October 28, 2008	Kitt Peak	Spacewatch	·	1.2 km	MPC · JPL
539576	2016 RE_{47}	—	November 19, 2003	Kitt Peak	Spacewatch	·	2.4 km	MPC · JPL
539577	2016 RZ_{47}	—	September 24, 2011	Haleakala	Pan-STARRS 1	EOS	1.8 km	MPC · JPL
539578	2016 RJ_{48}	—	September 8, 2016	Haleakala	Pan-STARRS 1	·	1.6 km	MPC · JPL
539579	2016 RL_{49}	—	March 26, 2015	Mount Lemmon	Mount Lemmon Survey	·	1.9 km	MPC · JPL
539580	2016 RS_{49}	—	October 1, 2011	Kitt Peak	Spacewatch	EOS	1.6 km	MPC · JPL
539581	2016 RV_{49}	—	July 27, 2011	Haleakala	Pan-STARRS 1	GEF	940 m	MPC · JPL
539582	2016 RC_{50}	—	February 11, 2008	Kitt Peak	Spacewatch	·	1.6 km	MPC · JPL
539583	2016 RJ_{50}	—	February 20, 2014	Mount Lemmon	Mount Lemmon Survey	·	1.8 km	MPC · JPL
539584	2016 SM_{4}	—	April 18, 2010	WISE	WISE	·	2.7 km	MPC · JPL
539585	2016 SU_{4}	—	April 30, 2010	WISE	WISE	·	3.0 km	MPC · JPL
539586	2016 SW_{4}	—	December 31, 2013	Haleakala	Pan-STARRS 1	·	1.6 km	MPC · JPL
539587	2016 SZ_{4}	—	October 25, 2011	Haleakala	Pan-STARRS 1	·	2.9 km	MPC · JPL
539588	2016 SX_{5}	—	April 29, 2010	WISE	WISE	·	2.9 km	MPC · JPL
539589	2016 SJ_{7}	—	January 13, 2008	Kitt Peak	Spacewatch	TIR	3.8 km	MPC · JPL
539590	2016 SD_{8}	—	December 11, 2004	Kitt Peak	Spacewatch	·	2.4 km	MPC · JPL
539591	2016 SH_{9}	—	August 30, 2005	Kitt Peak	Spacewatch	MAS	690 m	MPC · JPL
539592	2016 SU_{10}	—	November 2, 2007	Kitt Peak	Spacewatch	·	1.8 km	MPC · JPL
539593	2016 ST_{11}	—	August 28, 2005	Kitt Peak	Spacewatch	·	2.6 km	MPC · JPL
539594	2016 SV_{14}	—	November 14, 2012	Kitt Peak	Spacewatch	·	1.1 km	MPC · JPL
539595	2016 SJ_{15}	—	September 20, 2009	Kitt Peak	Spacewatch	·	890 m	MPC · JPL
539596	2016 SO_{21}	—	October 20, 2012	Haleakala	Pan-STARRS 1	·	1.7 km	MPC · JPL
539597	2016 SP_{21}	—	August 16, 2010	La Sagra	OAM	·	2.7 km	MPC · JPL
539598	2016 SC_{24}	—	February 25, 2014	Haleakala	Pan-STARRS 1	·	2.0 km	MPC · JPL
539599	2016 SG_{25}	—	May 23, 2004	Kitt Peak	Spacewatch	·	2.2 km	MPC · JPL
539600	2016 SO_{25}	—	February 12, 2008	Mount Lemmon	Mount Lemmon Survey	EOS	1.7 km	MPC · JPL

== 539601–539700 ==
back to top

Designation			Discovery			Properties		Ref
Permanent	Provisional	Named after	Date	Site	Discoverer(s)	Category	Diam.	Ref
539601	2016 SS_{25}	—	August 28, 2005	Kitt Peak	Spacewatch	MAS	690 m	MPC · JPL
539602	2016 SD_{26}	—	September 11, 2007	Kitt Peak	Spacewatch	·	2.0 km	MPC · JPL
539603	2016 SF_{28}	—	September 6, 2008	Mount Lemmon	Mount Lemmon Survey	T_{j} (2.97) · 3:2	5.1 km	MPC · JPL
539604	2016 SV_{28}	—	October 10, 2007	Mount Lemmon	Mount Lemmon Survey	·	2.3 km	MPC · JPL
539605	2016 SR_{29}	—	July 2, 2008	Kitt Peak	Spacewatch	MAS	620 m	MPC · JPL
539606	2016 SS_{31}	—	January 4, 2013	Mount Lemmon	Mount Lemmon Survey	NEM	1.8 km	MPC · JPL
539607	2016 SO_{33}	—	April 20, 2009	Kitt Peak	Spacewatch	·	2.6 km	MPC · JPL
539608	2016 SY_{34}	—	June 6, 2010	WISE	WISE	·	4.8 km	MPC · JPL
539609	2016 SZ_{34}	—	February 23, 2015	Haleakala	Pan-STARRS 1	·	1.5 km	MPC · JPL
539610	2016 SR_{38}	—	December 27, 2005	Mount Lemmon	Mount Lemmon Survey	·	1 km	MPC · JPL
539611	2016 SG_{40}	—	March 17, 2015	Haleakala	Pan-STARRS 1	·	1.1 km	MPC · JPL
539612	2016 SK_{40}	—	October 26, 2011	Haleakala	Pan-STARRS 1	·	2.5 km	MPC · JPL
539613	2016 SZ_{40}	—	April 2, 2014	Mount Lemmon	Mount Lemmon Survey	KOR	1.4 km	MPC · JPL
539614	2016 SB_{41}	—	April 24, 2006	Kitt Peak	Spacewatch	·	1.6 km	MPC · JPL
539615	2016 SM_{41}	—	October 24, 2011	Kitt Peak	Spacewatch	·	2.2 km	MPC · JPL
539616	2016 SA_{42}	—	August 20, 2008	Kitt Peak	Spacewatch	·	1.0 km	MPC · JPL
539617	2016 SS_{42}	—	November 1, 2007	Mount Lemmon	Mount Lemmon Survey	·	1.4 km	MPC · JPL
539618	2016 SB_{44}	—	August 14, 2012	Siding Spring	SSS	NYS	1.1 km	MPC · JPL
539619	2016 SG_{44}	—	January 4, 2014	Mount Lemmon	Mount Lemmon Survey	·	1.5 km	MPC · JPL
539620	2016 SA_{46}	—	October 7, 2005	Catalina	CSS	EOS	2.4 km	MPC · JPL
539621	2016 SB_{46}	—	February 28, 2008	Mount Lemmon	Mount Lemmon Survey	EOS	1.6 km	MPC · JPL
539622	2016 SC_{48}	—	January 18, 2008	Kitt Peak	Spacewatch	·	2.9 km	MPC · JPL
539623	2016 SV_{48}	—	March 11, 2014	Mount Lemmon	Mount Lemmon Survey	·	3.0 km	MPC · JPL
539624	2016 SC_{49}	—	September 20, 2011	Haleakala	Pan-STARRS 1	KOR	1.2 km	MPC · JPL
539625	2016 SG_{49}	—	February 22, 2007	Kitt Peak	Spacewatch	·	2.5 km	MPC · JPL
539626	2016 SM_{49}	—	October 8, 2007	Mount Lemmon	Mount Lemmon Survey	AGN	1.1 km	MPC · JPL
539627	2016 SS_{49}	—	September 30, 2016	Haleakala	Pan-STARRS 1	·	1.4 km	MPC · JPL
539628	2016 ST_{49}	—	September 20, 2008	Mount Lemmon	Mount Lemmon Survey	·	820 m	MPC · JPL
539629	2016 SA_{50}	—	December 31, 2007	Kitt Peak	Spacewatch	·	2.2 km	MPC · JPL
539630	2016 SC_{50}	—	March 27, 2008	Mount Lemmon	Mount Lemmon Survey	·	2.6 km	MPC · JPL
539631	2016 SE_{50}	—	October 15, 2007	Kitt Peak	Spacewatch	·	1.8 km	MPC · JPL
539632	2016 SL_{50}	—	September 25, 2011	Haleakala	Pan-STARRS 1	·	2.0 km	MPC · JPL
539633	2016 SN_{50}	—	September 11, 2005	Kitt Peak	Spacewatch	·	2.5 km	MPC · JPL
539634	2016 SO_{50}	—	October 18, 2011	Kitt Peak	Spacewatch	EOS	1.6 km	MPC · JPL
539635	2016 SR_{50}	—	February 20, 2014	Mount Lemmon	Mount Lemmon Survey	·	2.4 km	MPC · JPL
539636	2016 ST_{50}	—	May 13, 2009	Kitt Peak	Spacewatch	·	3.0 km	MPC · JPL
539637	2016 SX_{50}	—	September 4, 2007	Catalina	CSS	·	1.6 km	MPC · JPL
539638	2016 SY_{50}	—	October 24, 2003	Kitt Peak	Spacewatch	·	1.8 km	MPC · JPL
539639	2016 SC_{51}	—	March 10, 2014	Mount Lemmon	Mount Lemmon Survey	EUN	1.1 km	MPC · JPL
539640	2016 SD_{51}	—	October 22, 2012	Haleakala	Pan-STARRS 1	·	1.4 km	MPC · JPL
539641	2016 SE_{51}	—	September 30, 2003	Kitt Peak	Spacewatch	·	980 m	MPC · JPL
539642	2016 SF_{51}	—	September 30, 2003	Kitt Peak	Spacewatch	·	1.4 km	MPC · JPL
539643	2016 SG_{51}	—	October 26, 2011	Haleakala	Pan-STARRS 1	·	2.2 km	MPC · JPL
539644	2016 SH_{51}	—	September 28, 2003	Kitt Peak	Spacewatch	·	1.2 km	MPC · JPL
539645	2016 SJ_{51}	—	September 14, 2005	Catalina	CSS	·	2.7 km	MPC · JPL
539646	2016 SN_{51}	—	April 30, 2011	Mount Lemmon	Mount Lemmon Survey	PHO	780 m	MPC · JPL
539647	2016 SR_{51}	—	September 29, 2003	Kitt Peak	Spacewatch	·	1.3 km	MPC · JPL
539648	2016 ST_{51}	—	January 13, 2008	Mount Lemmon	Mount Lemmon Survey	·	3.0 km	MPC · JPL
539649	2016 SF_{54}	—	April 9, 2010	Kitt Peak	Spacewatch	MRX	990 m	MPC · JPL
539650	2016 SQ_{54}	—	April 30, 2014	Haleakala	Pan-STARRS 1	·	2.5 km	MPC · JPL
539651	2016 SE_{59}	—	August 21, 2006	Kitt Peak	Spacewatch	·	1.8 km	MPC · JPL
539652	2016 TW	—	January 28, 2006	Mount Lemmon	Mount Lemmon Survey	·	1.4 km	MPC · JPL
539653	2016 TT_{2}	—	October 9, 1999	Socorro	LINEAR	·	1.3 km	MPC · JPL
539654	2016 TC_{4}	—	March 13, 2005	Kitt Peak	Spacewatch	·	630 m	MPC · JPL
539655	2016 TF_{4}	—	October 22, 2006	Catalina	CSS	EOS	2.0 km	MPC · JPL
539656	2016 TL_{4}	—	October 3, 2006	Mount Lemmon	Mount Lemmon Survey	TEL	1.4 km	MPC · JPL
539657	2016 TO_{4}	—	March 23, 2003	Kitt Peak	Spacewatch	·	2.7 km	MPC · JPL
539658	2016 TQ_{4}	—	August 31, 2005	Kitt Peak	Spacewatch	·	2.2 km	MPC · JPL
539659	2016 TD_{6}	—	November 7, 2012	Kitt Peak	Spacewatch	·	2.0 km	MPC · JPL
539660	2016 TW_{11}	—	September 17, 2010	Mount Lemmon	Mount Lemmon Survey	·	3.3 km	MPC · JPL
539661	2016 TQ_{12}	—	April 25, 2010	WISE	WISE	·	3.2 km	MPC · JPL
539662	2016 TB_{16}	—	November 3, 2011	Mount Lemmon	Mount Lemmon Survey	·	3.3 km	MPC · JPL
539663	2016 TT_{22}	—	September 30, 2006	Mount Lemmon	Mount Lemmon Survey	·	2.6 km	MPC · JPL
539664	2016 TS_{25}	—	April 25, 2010	WISE	WISE	·	3.0 km	MPC · JPL
539665	2016 TJ_{26}	—	May 13, 2007	Mount Lemmon	Mount Lemmon Survey	·	1.2 km	MPC · JPL
539666	2016 TX_{27}	—	September 29, 2005	Kitt Peak	Spacewatch	VER	3.1 km	MPC · JPL
539667	2016 TL_{29}	—	September 19, 2006	Catalina	CSS	BRA	1.2 km	MPC · JPL
539668	2016 TW_{30}	—	October 10, 2012	Haleakala	Pan-STARRS 1	·	1.2 km	MPC · JPL
539669	2016 TM_{34}	—	October 10, 2012	Mount Lemmon	Mount Lemmon Survey	KRM	1.6 km	MPC · JPL
539670	2016 TU_{34}	—	September 27, 2011	Mount Lemmon	Mount Lemmon Survey	·	1.8 km	MPC · JPL
539671	2016 TW_{34}	—	October 23, 2005	Catalina	CSS	VER	3.4 km	MPC · JPL
539672	2016 TE_{35}	—	August 2, 2016	Haleakala	Pan-STARRS 1	EOS	1.9 km	MPC · JPL
539673	2016 TO_{40}	—	October 21, 2008	Kitt Peak	Spacewatch	EUN	780 m	MPC · JPL
539674	2016 TN_{42}	—	April 2, 2009	Kitt Peak	Spacewatch	·	2.5 km	MPC · JPL
539675	2016 TQ_{42}	—	September 4, 2011	Haleakala	Pan-STARRS 1	·	1.6 km	MPC · JPL
539676	2016 TM_{43}	—	September 7, 2004	Kitt Peak	Spacewatch	·	2.4 km	MPC · JPL
539677	2016 TP_{45}	—	November 20, 2006	Mount Lemmon	Mount Lemmon Survey	·	3.3 km	MPC · JPL
539678	2016 TZ_{46}	—	December 9, 1999	Kitt Peak	Spacewatch	·	2.3 km	MPC · JPL
539679	2016 TL_{47}	—	April 25, 2015	Haleakala	Pan-STARRS 1	·	950 m	MPC · JPL
539680	2016 TE_{53}	—	October 14, 2012	Kitt Peak	Spacewatch	WIT	840 m	MPC · JPL
539681	2016 TE_{61}	—	May 4, 2014	Haleakala	Pan-STARRS 1	EOS	1.8 km	MPC · JPL
539682	2016 TN_{63}	—	September 4, 2000	Kitt Peak	Spacewatch	·	2.3 km	MPC · JPL
539683	2016 TB_{66}	—	May 13, 2010	WISE	WISE	·	2.6 km	MPC · JPL
539684	2016 TJ_{66}	—	January 22, 2015	Haleakala	Pan-STARRS 1	JUN	920 m	MPC · JPL
539685	2016 TG_{70}	—	September 24, 2007	Kitt Peak	Spacewatch	·	1.7 km	MPC · JPL
539686	2016 TK_{70}	—	September 18, 2006	Kitt Peak	Spacewatch	NAE	2.0 km	MPC · JPL
539687	2016 TZ_{72}	—	October 8, 2008	Kitt Peak	Spacewatch	3:2	5.6 km	MPC · JPL
539688	2016 TE_{75}	—	February 9, 2013	Haleakala	Pan-STARRS 1	·	2.7 km	MPC · JPL
539689	2016 TF_{75}	—	September 30, 2006	Mount Lemmon	Mount Lemmon Survey	EOS	1.8 km	MPC · JPL
539690	2016 TZ_{75}	—	February 2, 2008	Mount Lemmon	Mount Lemmon Survey	·	2.4 km	MPC · JPL
539691	2016 TJ_{78}	—	November 17, 1995	Kitt Peak	Spacewatch	·	3.0 km	MPC · JPL
539692	2016 TD_{79}	—	September 13, 2007	Mount Lemmon	Mount Lemmon Survey	·	1.7 km	MPC · JPL
539693	2016 TB_{86}	—	March 13, 2008	Kitt Peak	Spacewatch	·	2.8 km	MPC · JPL
539694	2016 TE_{93}	—	October 13, 2016	Mount Lemmon	Mount Lemmon Survey	APO · critical	190 m	MPC · JPL
539695	2016 TS_{96}	—	February 18, 2004	Kitt Peak	Spacewatch	·	2.3 km	MPC · JPL
539696	2016 TT_{96}	—	October 22, 2006	Catalina	CSS	EOS	2.1 km	MPC · JPL
539697	2016 TB_{97}	—	July 2, 2005	Kitt Peak	Spacewatch	·	2.2 km	MPC · JPL
539698	2016 TL_{97}	—	December 2, 2010	Mount Lemmon	Mount Lemmon Survey	CYB	3.2 km	MPC · JPL
539699	2016 TN_{97}	—	February 1, 2013	Kitt Peak	Spacewatch	·	2.4 km	MPC · JPL
539700	2016 TT_{97}	—	February 19, 2002	Kitt Peak	Spacewatch	·	3.0 km	MPC · JPL

== 539701–539800 ==
back to top

Designation			Discovery			Properties		Ref
Permanent	Provisional	Named after	Date	Site	Discoverer(s)	Category	Diam.	Ref
539701	2016 TL_{98}	—	September 30, 2010	Mount Lemmon	Mount Lemmon Survey	·	2.9 km	MPC · JPL
539702	2016 TR_{98}	—	November 19, 2006	Kitt Peak	Spacewatch	EOS	1.5 km	MPC · JPL
539703	2016 TX_{98}	—	October 7, 2005	Kitt Peak	Spacewatch	·	1.9 km	MPC · JPL
539704	2016 TB_{100}	—	June 18, 2015	Haleakala	Pan-STARRS 1	·	2.1 km	MPC · JPL
539705	2016 TM_{100}	—	October 7, 2016	Haleakala	Pan-STARRS 1	·	1.7 km	MPC · JPL
539706	2016 TN_{100}	—	October 24, 2011	Haleakala	Pan-STARRS 1	·	2.5 km	MPC · JPL
539707	2016 UM	—	March 12, 2014	Haleakala	Pan-STARRS 1	·	2.4 km	MPC · JPL
539708	2016 UV	—	February 29, 2008	Kitt Peak	Spacewatch	·	3.2 km	MPC · JPL
539709	2016 UN_{1}	—	October 23, 2006	Kitt Peak	Spacewatch	EOS	1.5 km	MPC · JPL
539710	2016 UT_{2}	—	December 11, 2012	Mount Lemmon	Mount Lemmon Survey	·	1.2 km	MPC · JPL
539711	2016 UL_{3}	—	September 14, 2007	Mount Lemmon	Mount Lemmon Survey	·	1.7 km	MPC · JPL
539712	2016 UO_{11}	—	September 21, 2011	Mount Lemmon	Mount Lemmon Survey	AGN	1.2 km	MPC · JPL
539713	2016 UP_{11}	—	October 9, 2005	Kitt Peak	Spacewatch	·	2.2 km	MPC · JPL
539714	2016 UW_{11}	—	August 10, 2016	Haleakala	Pan-STARRS 1	·	1.9 km	MPC · JPL
539715	2016 UK_{12}	—	September 27, 2016	Mount Lemmon	Mount Lemmon Survey	·	1.6 km	MPC · JPL
539716	2016 UF_{14}	—	April 25, 2008	Mount Lemmon	Mount Lemmon Survey	·	3.4 km	MPC · JPL
539717	2016 UN_{14}	—	July 16, 1998	Kitt Peak	Spacewatch	·	1.3 km	MPC · JPL
539718	2016 UK_{23}	—	October 29, 2008	Kitt Peak	Spacewatch	EUN	930 m	MPC · JPL
539719	2016 UR_{29}	—	July 14, 2010	WISE	WISE	·	2.5 km	MPC · JPL
539720	2016 US_{30}	—	October 10, 2016	Mount Lemmon	Mount Lemmon Survey	·	1.9 km	MPC · JPL
539721	2016 UD_{35}	—	November 5, 2012	Kitt Peak	Spacewatch	·	1.2 km	MPC · JPL
539722	2016 UW_{37}	—	August 28, 2005	Kitt Peak	Spacewatch	PHO	780 m	MPC · JPL
539723	2016 UA_{38}	—	November 3, 2012	Haleakala	Pan-STARRS 1	·	1.5 km	MPC · JPL
539724	2016 UL_{38}	—	May 22, 2015	Haleakala	Pan-STARRS 1	JUN	1.0 km	MPC · JPL
539725	2016 UP_{38}	—	June 8, 2010	WISE	WISE	·	3.8 km	MPC · JPL
539726	2016 UK_{39}	—	October 20, 2011	Mount Lemmon	Mount Lemmon Survey	·	2.6 km	MPC · JPL
539727	2016 UU_{44}	—	June 17, 2015	Haleakala	Pan-STARRS 1	·	1.8 km	MPC · JPL
539728	2016 UV_{49}	—	June 18, 2007	Kitt Peak	Spacewatch	KON	2.1 km	MPC · JPL
539729	2016 UB_{50}	—	October 27, 2005	Mount Lemmon	Mount Lemmon Survey	·	2.1 km	MPC · JPL
539730	2016 UC_{52}	—	May 14, 2008	Mount Lemmon	Mount Lemmon Survey	·	3.3 km	MPC · JPL
539731	2016 UN_{58}	—	September 2, 2007	Mount Lemmon	Mount Lemmon Survey	·	1.6 km	MPC · JPL
539732	2016 UK_{59}	—	December 22, 2012	Haleakala	Pan-STARRS 1	EOS	1.7 km	MPC · JPL
539733	2016 UC_{60}	—	August 31, 2005	Kitt Peak	Spacewatch	·	3.1 km	MPC · JPL
539734	2016 UY_{61}	—	November 3, 2005	Catalina	CSS	·	2.5 km	MPC · JPL
539735	2016 UH_{63}	—	May 27, 2010	WISE	WISE	·	3.3 km	MPC · JPL
539736	2016 UK_{64}	—	May 20, 2015	Mount Lemmon	Mount Lemmon Survey	·	1.1 km	MPC · JPL
539737	2016 US_{64}	—	August 18, 2006	Kitt Peak	Spacewatch	·	1.8 km	MPC · JPL
539738	2016 UN_{68}	—	September 14, 2005	Kitt Peak	Spacewatch	·	1.0 km	MPC · JPL
539739	2016 UT_{68}	—	September 26, 2009	Kitt Peak	Spacewatch	·	880 m	MPC · JPL
539740	2016 UP_{69}	—	October 25, 2005	Kitt Peak	Spacewatch	·	3.0 km	MPC · JPL
539741	2016 UR_{69}	—	June 17, 2015	Haleakala	Pan-STARRS 1	·	1.8 km	MPC · JPL
539742	2016 UQ_{70}	—	October 26, 2011	Haleakala	Pan-STARRS 1	·	1.6 km	MPC · JPL
539743	2016 UK_{72}	—	October 18, 2011	Mount Lemmon	Mount Lemmon Survey	EOS	1.7 km	MPC · JPL
539744	2016 UX_{73}	—	September 19, 2006	Kitt Peak	Spacewatch	KOR	1.1 km	MPC · JPL
539745	2016 UK_{78}	—	March 26, 2006	Mount Lemmon	Mount Lemmon Survey	·	1.4 km	MPC · JPL
539746	2016 UD_{80}	—	October 10, 2004	Kitt Peak	Spacewatch	·	3.7 km	MPC · JPL
539747	2016 UQ_{81}	—	October 25, 2005	Kitt Peak	Spacewatch	·	2.8 km	MPC · JPL
539748	2016 US_{81}	—	October 1, 2011	Kitt Peak	Spacewatch	·	2.0 km	MPC · JPL
539749	2016 UP_{85}	—	September 18, 2010	Kitt Peak	Spacewatch	·	2.6 km	MPC · JPL
539750	2016 UH_{86}	—	December 21, 2006	Kitt Peak	Spacewatch	·	770 m	MPC · JPL
539751	2016 UU_{86}	—	September 19, 2003	Kitt Peak	Spacewatch	·	1.1 km	MPC · JPL
539752	2016 UK_{89}	—	October 6, 2005	Mount Lemmon	Mount Lemmon Survey	·	2.0 km	MPC · JPL
539753	2016 UL_{89}	—	March 30, 2015	Haleakala	Pan-STARRS 1	·	1.1 km	MPC · JPL
539754	2016 UY_{93}	—	September 26, 2006	Kitt Peak	Spacewatch	·	1.7 km	MPC · JPL
539755	2016 UH_{95}	—	September 23, 2011	Haleakala	Pan-STARRS 1	·	1.9 km	MPC · JPL
539756	2016 UB_{96}	—	March 22, 2006	Catalina	CSS	·	1.8 km	MPC · JPL
539757	2016 UK_{96}	—	November 4, 2007	Kitt Peak	Spacewatch	·	1.5 km	MPC · JPL
539758	2016 UN_{102}	—	April 11, 2005	Kitt Peak	Spacewatch	MRX	980 m	MPC · JPL
539759	2016 UO_{107}	—	December 18, 2009	Mount Lemmon	Mount Lemmon Survey	3:2 · SHU	3.1 km	MPC · JPL
539760	2016 UO_{116}	—	October 25, 2005	Kitt Peak	Spacewatch	·	2.5 km	MPC · JPL
539761	2016 UK_{128}	—	May 8, 2006	Mount Lemmon	Mount Lemmon Survey	·	1.4 km	MPC · JPL
539762	2016 UO_{135}	—	February 12, 2008	Mount Lemmon	Mount Lemmon Survey	·	2.1 km	MPC · JPL
539763	2016 UV_{135}	—	October 4, 2007	Kitt Peak	Spacewatch	·	1.8 km	MPC · JPL
539764	2016 UU_{136}	—	May 28, 2008	Mount Lemmon	Mount Lemmon Survey	·	1.2 km	MPC · JPL
539765	2016 UM_{141}	—	November 26, 2003	Kitt Peak	Spacewatch	·	1.9 km	MPC · JPL
539766	2016 UZ_{142}	—	October 26, 2005	Kitt Peak	Spacewatch	·	2.8 km	MPC · JPL
539767	2016 UF_{148}	—	October 3, 2006	Mount Lemmon	Mount Lemmon Survey	·	1.6 km	MPC · JPL
539768	2016 UT_{148}	—	May 6, 2006	Mount Lemmon	Mount Lemmon Survey	·	1.9 km	MPC · JPL
539769	2016 UY_{148}	—	November 17, 2011	Kitt Peak	Spacewatch	·	2.6 km	MPC · JPL
539770	2016 VL_{12}	—	October 13, 2010	Kitt Peak	Spacewatch	VER	2.3 km	MPC · JPL
539771	2016 VM_{19}	—	September 15, 2007	Mount Lemmon	Mount Lemmon Survey	·	2.0 km	MPC · JPL
539772	2016 WG_{4}	—	November 2, 2005	Mount Lemmon	Mount Lemmon Survey	·	3.1 km	MPC · JPL
539773	2016 WR_{4}	—	November 1, 2005	Mount Lemmon	Mount Lemmon Survey	PHO	1.3 km	MPC · JPL
539774	2016 WQ_{10}	—	February 27, 2014	Haleakala	Pan-STARRS 1	·	1.7 km	MPC · JPL
539775	2016 WY_{10}	—	April 17, 2009	Kitt Peak	Spacewatch	EOS	1.9 km	MPC · JPL
539776	2016 WL_{12}	—	October 11, 2005	Kitt Peak	Spacewatch	·	2.2 km	MPC · JPL
539777	2016 WN_{18}	—	May 21, 2015	Haleakala	Pan-STARRS 1	·	1.5 km	MPC · JPL
539778	2016 WO_{20}	—	June 4, 2014	Haleakala	Pan-STARRS 1	·	2.2 km	MPC · JPL
539779	2016 WD_{21}	—	April 8, 2010	Kitt Peak	Spacewatch	·	2.2 km	MPC · JPL
539780	2016 WF_{24}	—	August 13, 2010	Kitt Peak	Spacewatch	·	2.6 km	MPC · JPL
539781	2016 WL_{24}	—	April 2, 2011	Haleakala	Pan-STARRS 1	·	1.3 km	MPC · JPL
539782	2016 WC_{42}	—	July 21, 2010	WISE	WISE	URS	2.8 km	MPC · JPL
539783	2016 WH_{46}	—	December 29, 2011	Mount Lemmon	Mount Lemmon Survey	·	2.6 km	MPC · JPL
539784	2016 WU_{51}	—	July 8, 2010	WISE	WISE	·	2.6 km	MPC · JPL
539785	2016 WT_{52}	—	June 27, 2010	WISE	WISE	·	2.7 km	MPC · JPL
539786	2016 WT_{55}	—	November 1, 2011	Kitt Peak	Spacewatch	·	2.2 km	MPC · JPL
539787	2016 WG_{56}	—	November 19, 2007	Kitt Peak	Spacewatch	·	2.3 km	MPC · JPL
539788	2016 WD_{57}	—	April 26, 2008	Kitt Peak	Spacewatch	·	3.9 km	MPC · JPL
539789	2016 XT_{20}	—	July 4, 2013	Haleakala	Pan-STARRS 1	H	530 m	MPC · JPL
539790	2016 YP_{9}	—	May 28, 2014	Haleakala	Pan-STARRS 1	·	4.8 km	MPC · JPL
539791	2016 YH_{11}	—	July 24, 2010	WISE	WISE	·	3.3 km	MPC · JPL
539792	2017 AX_{2}	—	January 7, 2010	Kitt Peak	Spacewatch	·	910 m	MPC · JPL
539793	2017 AP_{21}	—	March 25, 2014	Haleakala	Pan-STARRS 1	·	1.2 km	MPC · JPL
539794	2017 BK_{29}	—	April 25, 2015	Haleakala	Pan-STARRS 1	H	410 m	MPC · JPL
539795	2017 BT_{29}	—	January 15, 2001	Kitt Peak	Spacewatch	H	550 m	MPC · JPL
539796	2017 BB_{56}	—	July 25, 2011	Haleakala	Pan-STARRS 1	L5	10 km	MPC · JPL
539797	2017 BG_{60}	—	February 24, 2012	Mount Lemmon	Mount Lemmon Survey	·	2.3 km	MPC · JPL
539798	2017 BD_{93}	—	March 14, 2007	Mount Lemmon	Mount Lemmon Survey	H	430 m	MPC · JPL
539799	2017 BP_{136}	—	March 6, 2013	Haleakala	Pan-STARRS 1	·	1.2 km	MPC · JPL
539800	2017 CD	—	July 2, 2005	Kitt Peak	Spacewatch	H	400 m	MPC · JPL

== 539801–539900 ==
back to top

Designation			Discovery			Properties		Ref
Permanent	Provisional	Named after	Date	Site	Discoverer(s)	Category	Diam.	Ref
539801	2017 CL	—	June 8, 2005	Kitt Peak	Spacewatch	H	390 m	MPC · JPL
539802	2017 CB_{1}	—	January 4, 2017	Haleakala	Pan-STARRS 1	H	410 m	MPC · JPL
539803	2017 CE_{3}	—	January 19, 2005	Kitt Peak	Spacewatch	L5	10 km	MPC · JPL
539804	2017 CQ_{4}	—	February 20, 2006	Mount Lemmon	Mount Lemmon Survey	V	830 m	MPC · JPL
539805	2017 CG_{5}	—	September 25, 2003	Palomar	NEAT	H	360 m	MPC · JPL
539806	2017 CR_{16}	—	October 3, 2006	Mount Lemmon	Mount Lemmon Survey	·	1.8 km	MPC · JPL
539807	2017 CS_{28}	—	December 1, 2008	Kitt Peak	Spacewatch	·	1.1 km	MPC · JPL
539808	2017 CS_{31}	—	January 27, 2017	Mount Lemmon	Mount Lemmon Survey	H	420 m	MPC · JPL
539809	2017 CF_{33}	—	November 1, 2005	Kitt Peak	Spacewatch	·	680 m	MPC · JPL
539810	2017 CO_{35}	—	November 19, 2008	Mount Lemmon	Mount Lemmon Survey	V	720 m	MPC · JPL
539811	2017 DQ	—	July 30, 2008	Mount Lemmon	Mount Lemmon Survey	·	3.8 km	MPC · JPL
539812	2017 DZ_{1}	—	April 5, 2003	Kitt Peak	Spacewatch	·	1.7 km	MPC · JPL
539813	2017 DY_{3}	—	February 8, 2007	Kitt Peak	Spacewatch	·	2.3 km	MPC · JPL
539814	2017 DW_{4}	—	September 2, 2008	Kitt Peak	Spacewatch	V	600 m	MPC · JPL
539815	2017 DY_{6}	—	January 23, 2006	Mount Lemmon	Mount Lemmon Survey	L5	10 km	MPC · JPL
539816	2017 DH_{7}	—	November 21, 2009	Mount Lemmon	Mount Lemmon Survey	·	710 m	MPC · JPL
539817	2017 DN_{11}	—	February 21, 2006	Catalina	CSS	·	1.7 km	MPC · JPL
539818	2017 DR_{14}	—	February 13, 2009	Kitt Peak	Spacewatch	H	370 m	MPC · JPL
539819	2017 DB_{15}	—	March 13, 2012	Catalina	CSS	H	420 m	MPC · JPL
539820	2017 DE_{15}	—	April 25, 2006	Mount Lemmon	Mount Lemmon Survey	H	590 m	MPC · JPL
539821	2017 DY_{18}	—	September 23, 2015	Haleakala	Pan-STARRS 1	·	1.7 km	MPC · JPL
539822	2017 DR_{24}	—	October 22, 1998	Kitt Peak	Spacewatch	·	1.3 km	MPC · JPL
539823	2017 DM_{25}	—	September 4, 2011	Haleakala	Pan-STARRS 1	·	840 m	MPC · JPL
539824	2017 DZ_{29}	—	December 24, 2005	Kitt Peak	Spacewatch	·	2.4 km	MPC · JPL
539825	2017 DC_{37}	—	February 20, 2009	Kitt Peak	Spacewatch	H	400 m	MPC · JPL
539826	2017 DD_{37}	—	July 5, 2010	Kitt Peak	Spacewatch	H	580 m	MPC · JPL
539827	2017 DN_{37}	—	March 15, 2012	Mount Lemmon	Mount Lemmon Survey	H	390 m	MPC · JPL
539828	2017 DY_{38}	—	January 31, 2006	Kitt Peak	Spacewatch	L5	7.9 km	MPC · JPL
539829	2017 DZ_{38}	—	January 30, 2006	Kitt Peak	Spacewatch	L5	8.7 km	MPC · JPL
539830	2017 DS_{44}	—	January 17, 2005	Kitt Peak	Spacewatch	L5	10 km	MPC · JPL
539831	2017 DH_{62}	—	April 25, 2007	Kitt Peak	Spacewatch	EOS	2.8 km	MPC · JPL
539832	2017 DO_{64}	—	August 3, 2015	Haleakala	Pan-STARRS 1	H	490 m	MPC · JPL
539833	2017 DR_{74}	—	August 10, 2010	Kitt Peak	Spacewatch	H	410 m	MPC · JPL
539834	2017 DJ_{78}	—	December 29, 2005	Mount Lemmon	Mount Lemmon Survey	V	750 m	MPC · JPL
539835	2017 DR_{78}	—	February 13, 2004	Kitt Peak	Spacewatch	H	560 m	MPC · JPL
539836	2017 DH_{80}	—	May 10, 2004	Palomar	NEAT	H	600 m	MPC · JPL
539837	2017 DS_{82}	—	December 1, 2010	Mount Lemmon	Mount Lemmon Survey	·	2.5 km	MPC · JPL
539838	2017 DW_{82}	—	February 19, 2009	Kitt Peak	Spacewatch	H	550 m	MPC · JPL
539839	2017 DH_{84}	—	December 27, 2006	Mount Lemmon	Mount Lemmon Survey	·	720 m	MPC · JPL
539840	2017 DU_{85}	—	December 4, 1996	Kitt Peak	Spacewatch	·	3.2 km	MPC · JPL
539841	2017 DA_{86}	—	March 19, 2009	Kitt Peak	Spacewatch	H	620 m	MPC · JPL
539842	2017 DJ_{87}	—	February 14, 2008	Catalina	CSS	·	2.2 km	MPC · JPL
539843	2017 DH_{88}	—	January 31, 2010	WISE	WISE	(6355)	4.2 km	MPC · JPL
539844	2017 DU_{88}	—	October 9, 2010	Mount Lemmon	Mount Lemmon Survey	TIR	2.9 km	MPC · JPL
539845	2017 DO_{91}	—	September 12, 2007	Kitt Peak	Spacewatch	H	640 m	MPC · JPL
539846	2017 DR_{95}	—	February 26, 2010	WISE	WISE	·	1.7 km	MPC · JPL
539847	2017 DE_{103}	—	November 21, 2006	Mount Lemmon	Mount Lemmon Survey	·	980 m	MPC · JPL
539848	2017 DG_{104}	—	July 28, 2011	Haleakala	Pan-STARRS 1	·	2.0 km	MPC · JPL
539849	2017 DO_{105}	—	November 5, 2007	Kitt Peak	Spacewatch	·	1.6 km	MPC · JPL
539850	2017 DR_{107}	—	January 28, 2006	Catalina	CSS	·	3.3 km	MPC · JPL
539851	2017 DP_{116}	—	January 3, 2017	Haleakala	Pan-STARRS 1	PHO	1.1 km	MPC · JPL
539852	2017 DA_{123}	—	August 11, 2007	Siding Spring	SSS	·	2.5 km	MPC · JPL
539853	2017 EP	—	December 8, 2005	Catalina	CSS	H	580 m	MPC · JPL
539854	2017 EL_{1}	—	October 25, 2000	Kitt Peak	Spacewatch	H	520 m	MPC · JPL
539855	2017 EN_{1}	—	March 25, 2007	Mount Lemmon	Mount Lemmon Survey	H	470 m	MPC · JPL
539856	2017 EV_{2}	—	March 5, 2017	Haleakala	Pan-STARRS 1	APO	230 m	MPC · JPL
539857	2017 EO_{3}	—	December 21, 2005	Socorro	LINEAR	H	550 m	MPC · JPL
539858	2017 EY_{3}	—	January 24, 2006	Mount Lemmon	Mount Lemmon Survey	H	540 m	MPC · JPL
539859	2017 EF_{11}	—	December 2, 2005	Mount Lemmon	Mount Lemmon Survey	H	410 m	MPC · JPL
539860	2017 EH_{14}	—	March 2, 2009	Mount Lemmon	Mount Lemmon Survey	H	510 m	MPC · JPL
539861	2017 EP_{14}	—	August 21, 2004	Siding Spring	SSS	·	810 m	MPC · JPL
539862	2017 EN_{17}	—	July 9, 2011	Haleakala	Pan-STARRS 1	·	850 m	MPC · JPL
539863	2017 EY_{24}	—	October 17, 2010	Mount Lemmon	Mount Lemmon Survey	EUN	1.1 km	MPC · JPL
539864	2017 FA	—	December 7, 2013	Haleakala	Pan-STARRS 1	H	460 m	MPC · JPL
539865	2017 FC	—	October 28, 2005	Mount Lemmon	Mount Lemmon Survey	H	740 m	MPC · JPL
539866	2017 FD	—	November 26, 2010	Mount Lemmon	Mount Lemmon Survey	H	600 m	MPC · JPL
539867	2017 FL	—	August 26, 2000	Socorro	LINEAR	H	680 m	MPC · JPL
539868	2017 FT_{1}	—	September 12, 2013	Catalina	CSS	H	320 m	MPC · JPL
539869	2017 FX_{1}	—	November 8, 2013	Mount Lemmon	Mount Lemmon Survey	H	580 m	MPC · JPL
539870	2017 FG_{2}	—	October 14, 2004	Kitt Peak	Spacewatch	H	430 m	MPC · JPL
539871	2017 FL_{2}	—	July 23, 2015	Haleakala	Pan-STARRS 1	H	590 m	MPC · JPL
539872	2017 FV_{8}	—	February 24, 2006	Kitt Peak	Spacewatch	H	540 m	MPC · JPL
539873	2017 FA_{24}	—	May 22, 2011	Mount Lemmon	Mount Lemmon Survey	·	670 m	MPC · JPL
539874	2017 FU_{24}	—	August 25, 2011	La Sagra	OAM	·	790 m	MPC · JPL
539875	2017 FQ_{25}	—	May 7, 2006	Mount Lemmon	Mount Lemmon Survey	V	700 m	MPC · JPL
539876	2017 FV_{25}	—	April 30, 2006	Kitt Peak	Spacewatch	·	1.2 km	MPC · JPL
539877	2017 FQ_{29}	—	October 7, 2004	Kitt Peak	Spacewatch	·	760 m	MPC · JPL
539878	2017 FP_{31}	—	August 9, 2015	Haleakala	Pan-STARRS 1	H	550 m	MPC · JPL
539879	2017 FF_{32}	—	September 21, 2008	Kitt Peak	Spacewatch	·	660 m	MPC · JPL
539880	2017 FO_{35}	—	January 22, 2006	Mount Lemmon	Mount Lemmon Survey	·	1.7 km	MPC · JPL
539881	2017 FG_{39}	—	January 23, 2006	Kitt Peak	Spacewatch	·	2.9 km	MPC · JPL
539882	2017 FN_{40}	—	May 5, 2014	Mount Lemmon	Mount Lemmon Survey	·	580 m	MPC · JPL
539883	2017 FM_{41}	—	April 24, 2000	Kitt Peak	Spacewatch	·	1.9 km	MPC · JPL
539884	2017 FE_{42}	—	March 26, 2003	Kitt Peak	Spacewatch	·	1.0 km	MPC · JPL
539885	2017 FF_{42}	—	October 25, 2008	Kitt Peak	Spacewatch	·	850 m	MPC · JPL
539886	2017 FM_{47}	—	August 8, 2007	Socorro	LINEAR	·	960 m	MPC · JPL
539887	2017 FZ_{50}	—	May 7, 2014	Haleakala	Pan-STARRS 1	·	750 m	MPC · JPL
539888	2017 FP_{59}	—	June 6, 2014	Haleakala	Pan-STARRS 1	PHO	630 m	MPC · JPL
539889	2017 FW_{59}	—	October 12, 2005	Kitt Peak	Spacewatch	·	670 m	MPC · JPL
539890	2017 FG_{64}	—	September 25, 2005	Kitt Peak	Spacewatch	H	480 m	MPC · JPL
539891	2017 FJ_{65}	—	June 20, 2010	WISE	WISE	·	2.1 km	MPC · JPL
539892	2017 FG_{70}	—	September 14, 2005	Kitt Peak	Spacewatch	·	670 m	MPC · JPL
539893	2017 FD_{76}	—	November 23, 2011	Mount Lemmon	Mount Lemmon Survey	NYS	1.2 km	MPC · JPL
539894	2017 FY_{76}	—	December 20, 2001	Kitt Peak	Spacewatch	·	2.3 km	MPC · JPL
539895	2017 FS_{78}	—	November 18, 2008	Kitt Peak	Spacewatch	V	640 m	MPC · JPL
539896	2017 FY_{78}	—	March 25, 2003	Kitt Peak	Spacewatch	·	2.4 km	MPC · JPL
539897	2017 FA_{79}	—	October 30, 2010	Kitt Peak	Spacewatch	·	1.0 km	MPC · JPL
539898	2017 FR_{88}	—	July 7, 2014	Haleakala	Pan-STARRS 1	·	960 m	MPC · JPL
539899	2017 FE_{91}	—	October 13, 2015	Haleakala	Pan-STARRS 1	H	440 m	MPC · JPL
539900	2017 FP_{92}	—	July 5, 2011	Haleakala	Pan-STARRS 1	·	870 m	MPC · JPL

== 539901–540000 ==
back to top

Designation			Discovery			Properties		Ref
Permanent	Provisional	Named after	Date	Site	Discoverer(s)	Category	Diam.	Ref
539901	2017 FX_{94}	—	November 5, 2010	Mount Lemmon	Mount Lemmon Survey	H	490 m	MPC · JPL
539902	2017 FZ_{100}	—	June 4, 2010	WISE	WISE	·	1.4 km	MPC · JPL
539903	2017 FD_{102}	—	September 14, 2007	Kitt Peak	Spacewatch	H	460 m	MPC · JPL
539904	2017 FT_{103}	—	October 21, 2003	Anderson Mesa	LONEOS	·	1.2 km	MPC · JPL
539905	2017 FT_{106}	—	November 14, 2006	Mount Lemmon	Mount Lemmon Survey	EUN	1.3 km	MPC · JPL
539906	2017 FX_{106}	—	July 27, 2014	Haleakala	Pan-STARRS 1	MAR	1.1 km	MPC · JPL
539907	2017 FQ_{108}	—	March 31, 2014	Catalina	CSS	H	500 m	MPC · JPL
539908	2017 FF_{109}	—	March 14, 2007	Kitt Peak	Spacewatch	·	780 m	MPC · JPL
539909	2017 FE_{112}	—	September 22, 2011	Kitt Peak	Spacewatch	·	750 m	MPC · JPL
539910	2017 FY_{112}	—	August 22, 2004	Kitt Peak	Spacewatch	·	680 m	MPC · JPL
539911	2017 FU_{115}	—	July 30, 2008	Kitt Peak	Spacewatch	·	620 m	MPC · JPL
539912	2017 FV_{117}	—	September 29, 2008	Mount Lemmon	Mount Lemmon Survey	V	580 m	MPC · JPL
539913	2017 FN_{120}	—	September 15, 2007	Kitt Peak	Spacewatch	·	1.6 km	MPC · JPL
539914	2017 FH_{125}	—	March 19, 2017	Mount Lemmon	Mount Lemmon Survey	H	470 m	MPC · JPL
539915	2017 FF_{127}	—	December 5, 2008	Catalina	CSS	H	450 m	MPC · JPL
539916	2017 FS_{127}	—	November 9, 2013	Mount Lemmon	Mount Lemmon Survey	H	360 m	MPC · JPL
539917	2017 FW_{127}	—	October 7, 2010	Catalina	CSS	H	470 m	MPC · JPL
539918	2017 FC_{128}	—	March 11, 2011	Mount Lemmon	Mount Lemmon Survey	·	1.2 km	MPC · JPL
539919	2017 FX_{128}	—	December 22, 2005	Socorro	LINEAR	H	570 m	MPC · JPL
539920	2017 FA_{131}	—	February 11, 2002	Kitt Peak	Spacewatch	·	2.1 km	MPC · JPL
539921	2017 FW_{157}	—	March 14, 2007	Mount Lemmon	Mount Lemmon Survey	·	880 m	MPC · JPL
539922	2017 FA_{160}	—	November 8, 2007	Mount Lemmon	Mount Lemmon Survey	H	650 m	MPC · JPL
539923	2017 FX_{161}	—	September 4, 2014	Haleakala	Pan-STARRS 1	EUN	1.3 km	MPC · JPL
539924	2017 GE	—	September 22, 2008	Catalina	CSS	·	930 m	MPC · JPL
539925	2017 GF_{4}	—	May 14, 2009	Kitt Peak	Spacewatch	H	560 m	MPC · JPL
539926	2017 GD_{5}	—	September 28, 2013	Mount Lemmon	Mount Lemmon Survey	H	450 m	MPC · JPL
539927	2017 GV_{5}	—	January 4, 2014	Mount Lemmon	Mount Lemmon Survey	H	470 m	MPC · JPL
539928	2017 GE_{6}	—	August 30, 2015	Haleakala	Pan-STARRS 1	H	560 m	MPC · JPL
539929	2017 GB_{7}	—	December 21, 2008	Kitt Peak	Spacewatch	·	1.9 km	MPC · JPL
539930	2017 GP_{7}	—	July 1, 2005	Kitt Peak	Spacewatch	H	410 m	MPC · JPL
539931	2017 GQ_{7}	—	December 4, 2015	Haleakala	Pan-STARRS 1	H	590 m	MPC · JPL
539932	2017 GS_{7}	—	November 26, 2012	Mount Lemmon	Mount Lemmon Survey	PHO	1.4 km	MPC · JPL
539933	2017 GG_{9}	—	October 29, 2010	Mount Lemmon	Mount Lemmon Survey	ADE	2.1 km	MPC · JPL
539934	2017 GH_{9}	—	May 2, 2006	Mount Lemmon	Mount Lemmon Survey	·	3.6 km	MPC · JPL
539935	2017 GR_{9}	—	November 16, 2014	Haleakala	Pan-STARRS 1	EUN	1.3 km	MPC · JPL
539936	2017 GB_{10}	—	October 22, 2014	Mount Lemmon	Mount Lemmon Survey	(5)	1.0 km	MPC · JPL
539937	2017 HL	—	November 7, 2007	Catalina	CSS	H	460 m	MPC · JPL
539938	2017 HR	—	April 14, 2007	Mount Lemmon	Mount Lemmon Survey	H	380 m	MPC · JPL
539939	2017 HP_{1}	—	November 11, 2004	Catalina	CSS	H	680 m	MPC · JPL
539940	2017 HW_{1}	—	April 18, 2017	WISE	WISE	AMO +1km · moon	890 m	MPC · JPL
539941	2017 HX_{1}	—	December 9, 2010	Socorro	LINEAR	H	570 m	MPC · JPL
539942	2017 HO_{2}	—	July 23, 2015	Haleakala	Pan-STARRS 1	H	380 m	MPC · JPL
539943	2017 HA_{3}	—	March 27, 2003	Kitt Peak	Spacewatch	·	1.9 km	MPC · JPL
539944	2017 HF_{3}	—	January 23, 2014	Kitt Peak	Spacewatch	H	500 m	MPC · JPL
539945	2017 HK_{4}	—	October 8, 2015	Haleakala	Pan-STARRS 1	H	420 m	MPC · JPL
539946	2017 HB_{5}	—	March 18, 2004	Socorro	LINEAR	·	490 m	MPC · JPL
539947	2017 HP_{5}	—	November 16, 2006	Kitt Peak	Spacewatch	·	1.6 km	MPC · JPL
539948	2017 HA_{8}	—	April 8, 2010	WISE	WISE	·	900 m	MPC · JPL
539949	2017 HB_{8}	—	December 4, 2015	Haleakala	Pan-STARRS 1	·	830 m	MPC · JPL
539950	2017 HR_{8}	—	October 3, 2013	Haleakala	Pan-STARRS 1	·	2.9 km	MPC · JPL
539951	2017 HZ_{10}	—	October 20, 2006	Kitt Peak	Spacewatch	·	1.4 km	MPC · JPL
539952	2017 HD_{12}	—	January 11, 2008	Kitt Peak	Spacewatch	·	1.6 km	MPC · JPL
539953	2017 HM_{12}	—	September 1, 2014	Catalina	CSS	·	1.4 km	MPC · JPL
539954	2017 HN_{12}	—	June 23, 2009	Mount Lemmon	Mount Lemmon Survey	·	1.9 km	MPC · JPL
539955	2017 HG_{13}	—	March 19, 2009	Kitt Peak	Spacewatch	·	960 m	MPC · JPL
539956	2017 HS_{14}	—	October 5, 2004	Kitt Peak	Spacewatch	·	850 m	MPC · JPL
539957	2017 HZ_{14}	—	October 27, 2005	Kitt Peak	Spacewatch	·	750 m	MPC · JPL
539958	2017 HT_{20}	—	April 27, 2000	Kitt Peak	Spacewatch	ADE	1.5 km	MPC · JPL
539959	2017 HL_{22}	—	July 28, 2009	Catalina	CSS	·	2.0 km	MPC · JPL
539960	2017 HF_{25}	—	April 5, 2000	Socorro	LINEAR	·	1.5 km	MPC · JPL
539961	2017 HY_{31}	—	September 18, 2014	Haleakala	Pan-STARRS 1	·	1.3 km	MPC · JPL
539962	2017 HW_{35}	—	February 1, 2006	Kitt Peak	Spacewatch	·	890 m	MPC · JPL
539963	2017 HS_{40}	—	March 2, 2011	Catalina	CSS	·	3.4 km	MPC · JPL
539964	2017 HZ_{40}	—	February 27, 2009	Mount Lemmon	Mount Lemmon Survey	NYS	980 m	MPC · JPL
539965	2017 HM_{46}	—	April 30, 2006	Kitt Peak	Spacewatch	·	2.8 km	MPC · JPL
539966	2017 HQ_{48}	—	June 18, 2013	Haleakala	Pan-STARRS 1	·	1.6 km	MPC · JPL
539967	2017 HO_{50}	—	April 7, 2013	Kitt Peak	Spacewatch	·	1.3 km	MPC · JPL
539968	2017 HM_{61}	—	March 1, 2008	Mount Lemmon	Mount Lemmon Survey	·	1.3 km	MPC · JPL
539969	2017 HT_{62}	—	May 15, 2013	Haleakala	Pan-STARRS 1	·	1.1 km	MPC · JPL
539970	2017 JR	—	March 23, 2006	Catalina	CSS	·	1.4 km	MPC · JPL
539971	2017 JW	—	November 18, 2008	Catalina	CSS	·	780 m	MPC · JPL
539972	2017 JE_{1}	—	August 22, 2015	Catalina	CSS	H	470 m	MPC · JPL
539973	2017 JF_{1}	—	November 14, 2010	Mount Lemmon	Mount Lemmon Survey	H	580 m	MPC · JPL
539974	2017 JJ_{1}	—	May 26, 2006	Kitt Peak	Spacewatch	H	550 m	MPC · JPL
539975	2017 JL_{1}	—	May 10, 2012	Haleakala	Pan-STARRS 1	H	410 m	MPC · JPL
539976	2017 JN_{1}	—	September 15, 2007	Mount Lemmon	Mount Lemmon Survey	H	580 m	MPC · JPL
539977	2017 JC_{2}	—	February 21, 2014	Haleakala	Pan-STARRS 1	H	650 m	MPC · JPL
539978	2017 JF_{2}	—	August 12, 2007	Siding Spring	SSS	H	570 m	MPC · JPL
539979	2017 JG_{2}	—	August 20, 2009	Siding Spring	SSS	BAR	1.4 km	MPC · JPL
539980	2017 JY_{2}	—	December 2, 2015	Haleakala	Pan-STARRS 1	H	510 m	MPC · JPL
539981	2017 JJ_{3}	—	August 4, 2011	Siding Spring	SSS	·	780 m	MPC · JPL
539982	2017 JK_{3}	—	December 10, 2010	Mount Lemmon	Mount Lemmon Survey	H	530 m	MPC · JPL
539983	2017 JX_{3}	—	September 9, 1993	Kitt Peak	Spacewatch	·	1.1 km	MPC · JPL
539984	2017 JL_{4}	—	October 22, 2014	Kitt Peak	Spacewatch	JUN	860 m	MPC · JPL
539985	2017 JH_{6}	—	January 28, 2011	Mount Lemmon	Mount Lemmon Survey	·	1.8 km	MPC · JPL
539986	2017 KA	—	March 23, 2014	Mount Lemmon	Mount Lemmon Survey	H	450 m	MPC · JPL
539987	2017 KC	—	March 24, 2003	Kitt Peak	Spacewatch	V	760 m	MPC · JPL
539988	2017 KM	—	October 31, 2010	Mount Lemmon	Mount Lemmon Survey	H	460 m	MPC · JPL
539989	2017 KT	—	April 7, 2008	Mount Lemmon	Mount Lemmon Survey	·	1.8 km	MPC · JPL
539990	2017 KC_{2}	—	December 14, 2010	Mount Lemmon	Mount Lemmon Survey	·	1.5 km	MPC · JPL
539991	2017 KN_{2}	—	March 10, 2003	Kitt Peak	Spacewatch	H	560 m	MPC · JPL
539992	2017 KP_{2}	—	October 3, 2015	Haleakala	Pan-STARRS 1	H	470 m	MPC · JPL
539993	2017 KR_{2}	—	March 13, 2014	Haleakala	Pan-STARRS 1	H	570 m	MPC · JPL
539994	2017 KZ_{3}	—	March 31, 2009	Mount Lemmon	Mount Lemmon Survey	H	530 m	MPC · JPL
539995	2017 KO_{5}	—	October 2, 2015	Haleakala	Pan-STARRS 1	H	490 m	MPC · JPL
539996	2017 KJ_{10}	—	July 7, 2014	Haleakala	Pan-STARRS 1	·	920 m	MPC · JPL
539997	2017 KU_{11}	—	October 26, 2008	Mount Lemmon	Mount Lemmon Survey	·	1.8 km	MPC · JPL
539998	2017 KV_{11}	—	October 8, 2008	Mount Lemmon	Mount Lemmon Survey	·	630 m	MPC · JPL
539999	2017 KJ_{12}	—	August 31, 2014	Kitt Peak	Spacewatch	(2076)	640 m	MPC · JPL
540000	2017 KN_{12}	—	April 26, 2006	Mount Lemmon	Mount Lemmon Survey	·	3.5 km	MPC · JPL

back to top
