= List of Jupiter trojans (Greek camp) (500001–600000) =

This is a partial list of Jupiter's L_{4} trojans (60° ahead of Jupiter) with numbers 500001–600000. If available, an object's mean diameter is taken from the NEOWISE data release, which the Small-Body Database has also adopted. Mean diameters are rounded to two significant figures if smaller than 100 kilometers. Estimates are in italics and calculated from a magnitude-to-diameter conversion, using an assumed albedo of 0.057.

== 500001–600000 ==
This list contains 829 objects sorted in numerical order.

Designation	Discovery			Orbital description					Diam.	Remarks	Refs
Designation	Date	Observer	Site	a (AU)	e	i (°)	q (AU)	Q (AU)	Diam.	Remarks	Refs
(500784) 2013 EG_{42}	6 March 2013	Pan-STARRS 1	Haleakala	5.194	0.025	3.5	5.063	5.324	6.3 km	–	catalog · MPC · JPL
(502893) 2015 DA_{223}	31 October 2010	Spacewatch	Kitt Peak	5.170	0.057	8.7	4.874	5.465	9.0 km	–	catalog · MPC · JPL
(503014) 2015 FW_{110}	10 August 2007	Spacewatch	Kitt Peak	5.225	0.036	3.7	5.037	5.412	8.5 km	–	catalog · MPC · JPL
(503262) 2015 KE_{127}	10 February 2014	Pan-STARRS 1	Haleakala	5.244	0.092	5.9	4.761	5.726	7.4 km	–	catalog · MPC · JPL
(507220) 2010 WJ_{19}	28 September 2008	MLS	Mount Lemmon	5.211	0.034	5.8	5.032	5.391	7.4 km	–	catalog · MPC · JPL
(507354) 2011 UQ_{402}	26 October 2011	Pan-STARRS 1	Haleakala	5.167	0.063	7.6	4.844	5.491	7.1 km	–	catalog · MPC · JPL
(507370) 2011 YF_{75}	28 January 2010	WISE	WISE	5.230	0.068	8.4	4.875	5.585	7.8 km	–	catalog · MPC · JPL
(507834) 2014 EX_{41}	2 December 2010	Spacewatch	Kitt Peak	5.128	0.083	11.4	4.701	5.554	8.5 km	–	catalog · MPC · JPL
(508854) 2002 GC_{192}	14 April 2002	Spacewatch	Kitt Peak	5.138	0.069	6.6	4.785	5.490	7.0 km	–	catalog · MPC · JPL
(509697) 2008 RE_{99}	2 September 2008	Spacewatch	Kitt Peak	5.178	0.048	4.9	4.928	5.429	7.0 km	–	catalog · MPC · JPL
(510140) 2010 UK_{108}	30 October 2010	Spacewatch	Kitt Peak	5.125	0.045	6.1	4.895	5.356	7.7 km	–	catalog · MPC · JPL
(510500) 2011 YK_{49}	25 December 2011	MLS	Mount Lemmon	5.203	0.106	13.7	4.650	5.755	8.8 km	–	catalog · MPC · JPL
(510505) 2012 BL_{15}	4 September 2008	Spacewatch	Kitt Peak	5.245	0.160	8.0	4.407	6.084	6.4 km	–	catalog · MPC · JPL
(510508) 2012 BY_{34}	24 August 2008	Spacewatch	Kitt Peak	5.287	0.128	10.1	4.610	5.964	9.2 km	–	catalog · MPC · JPL
(510515) 2012 BV_{96}	15 December 2010	MLS	Mount Lemmon	5.197	0.052	12.6	4.926	5.467	8.2 km	–	catalog · MPC · JPL
(510519) 2012 BB_{155}	12 September 2007	MLS	Mount Lemmon	5.191	0.050	7.9	4.934	5.449	7.6 km	–	catalog · MPC · JPL
(510520) 2012 BE_{155}	25 October 2009	Spacewatch	Kitt Peak	5.159	0.062	3.4	4.838	5.480	6.9 km	–	catalog · MPC · JPL
(510546) 2012 JJ_{67}	20 February 2002	Spacewatch	Kitt Peak	5.170	0.061	5.3	4.855	5.486	7.6 km	–	catalog · MPC · JPL
(510793) 2013 AU_{132}	24 August 2008	Spacewatch	Kitt Peak	5.143	0.003	8.6	5.128	5.158	9.3 km	–	catalog · MPC · JPL
(510904) 2013 CX_{210}	24 August 2008	Spacewatch	Kitt Peak	5.300	0.036	19.5	5.111	5.489	9.8 km	–	catalog · MPC · JPL
(511393) 2014 GU_{54}	19 September 2008	Spacewatch	Kitt Peak	5.182	0.026	25.0	5.047	5.316	8.9 km	–	catalog · MPC · JPL
(512282) 2016 GC_{124}	21 March 2015	PMO NEO Survey Program	XuYi	5.153	0.015	30.2	5.074	5.232	9.7 km	–	catalog · MPC · JPL
(542169) 2013 AD_{8}	23 November 2011	Spacewatch	Kitt Peak	5.304	0.018	8.5	5.207	5.400	10 km	–	catalog · MPC · JPL
(542187) 2013 AB_{43}	15 October 2012	Spacewatch	Kitt Peak	5.158	0.149	11.9	4.391	5.925	11 km	–	catalog · MPC · JPL
(542195) 2013 AX_{54}	15 September 2009	Spacewatch	Kitt Peak	5.293	0.022	2.2	5.177	5.409	9.1 km	–	catalog · MPC · JPL
(542206) 2013 AT_{70}	21 December 2011	L. Elenin	Mayhill-ISON	5.279	0.069	16.9	4.917	5.641	11 km	–	catalog · MPC · JPL
(542207) 2013 AP_{75}	5 November 2010	MLS	Mount Lemmon	5.217	0.076	6.4	4.823	5.612	8.6 km	–	catalog · MPC · JPL
(542209) 2013 AE_{79}	4 January 2013	Spacewatch	Kitt Peak	5.210	0.064	26.4	4.879	5.542	12 km	–	catalog · MPC · JPL
542246 Kulcsár	26 August 2008	K. Sárneczky	Piszkesteto	5.216	0.066	9.8	4.871	5.561	9.7 km	–	catalog · MPC · JPL
(542261) 2013 BJ	23 December 2012	Pan-STARRS 1	Haleakala	5.263	0.102	6.8	4.726	5.801	7.8 km	–	catalog · MPC · JPL
(542262) 2013 BL	3 November 2010	MLS	Mount Lemmon	5.143	0.022	8.5	5.031	5.255	8.9 km	–	catalog · MPC · JPL
(542263) 2013 BS	28 September 2009	Spacewatch	Kitt Peak	5.181	0.046	4.8	4.941	5.420	10 km	–	catalog · MPC · JPL
(542264) 2013 BC_{2}	24 March 2003	J. Dellinger	Needville	5.095	0.033	7.2	4.926	5.263	8.2 km	–	catalog · MPC · JPL
(542265) 2013 BT_{2}	17 October 2009	MLS	Mount Lemmon	5.231	0.034	5.4	5.055	5.406	8.3 km	–	catalog · MPC · JPL
(542275) 2013 BY_{16}	2 November 2010	MLS	Mount Lemmon	5.237	0.063	8.3	4.908	5.567	8.9 km	–	catalog · MPC · JPL
(542276) 2013 BB_{19}	13 December 2012	Spacewatch	Kitt Peak	5.202	0.033	22.1	5.028	5.376	14 km	–	catalog · MPC · JPL
(542316) 2013 CV	2 September 2008	Spacewatch	Kitt Peak	5.243	0.022	4.0	5.127	5.360	7.6 km	–	catalog · MPC · JPL
(542323) 2013 CR_{12}	24 July 2007	Mauna Kea	Mauna Kea	5.119	0.065	7.3	4.787	5.451	7.5 km	–	catalog · MPC · JPL
(542325) 2013 CB_{16}	27 December 2011	Spacewatch	Kitt Peak	5.165	0.050	11.3	4.908	5.422	9.3 km	–	catalog · MPC · JPL
(542346) 2013 CV_{35}	26 March 2003	NEAT	Palomar	5.157	0.022	14.8	5.043	5.272	9.8 km	–	catalog · MPC · JPL
(542350) 2013 CF_{39}	12 September 2007	MLS	Mount Lemmon	5.288	0.016	3.7	5.206	5.371	9.4 km	–	catalog · MPC · JPL
(542352) 2013 CE_{44}	9 September 2007	Mauna Kea	Mauna Kea	5.213	0.023	10.0	5.095	5.332	8.3 km	–	catalog · MPC · JPL
(542378) 2013 CZ_{70}	10 January 2013	Pan-STARRS 1	Haleakala	5.150	0.112	7.5	4.572	5.728	7.5 km	–	catalog · MPC · JPL
(542399) 2013 CH_{95}	23 September 2008	Spacewatch	Kitt Peak	5.181	0.025	6.4	5.050	5.312	8.1 km	–	catalog · MPC · JPL
(542789) 2013 JC_{15}	30 October 2009	MLS	Mount Lemmon	5.315	0.092	9.2	4.828	5.802	9.1 km	–	catalog · MPC · JPL
(543396) 2014 DA_{56}	17 September 2009	MLS	Mount Lemmon	5.224	0.076	4.4	4.828	5.620	7.9 km	–	catalog · MPC · JPL
(543397) 2014 DQ_{60}	24 April 2003	Spacewatch	Kitt Peak	5.308	0.052	8.3	5.031	5.585	8.1 km	–	catalog · MPC · JPL
(546195) 2010 TO_{192}	27 October 2009	MLS	Mount Lemmon	5.154	0.082	9.3	4.731	5.578	6.2 km	–	catalog · MPC · JPL
(546218) 2010 TK_{210}	13 October 2010	Spacewatch	Kitt Peak	5.152	0.059	15.2	4.847	5.457	6.2 km	–	catalog · MPC · JPL
(546242) 2010 UX_{36}	29 October 2010	MLS	Mount Lemmon	5.308	0.067	7.9	4.953	5.664	9.8 km	–	catalog · MPC · JPL
(546256) 2010 UT_{50}	31 October 2010	MLS	Mount Lemmon	5.154	0.092	26.3	4.678	5.630	12 km	–	catalog · MPC · JPL
(546263) 2010 UE_{66}	28 September 2009	MLS	Mount Lemmon	5.241	0.022	11.3	5.128	5.354	8.2 km	–	catalog · MPC · JPL
(546273) 2010 UY_{81}	16 October 2010	R. Ferrando; M. Ferrando	Pla D'Arguines	5.171	0.197	5.6	4.152	6.191	8.0 km	–	catalog · MPC · JPL
(546274) 2010 UO_{83}	11 March 2003	Spacewatch	Kitt Peak	5.155	0.069	20.5	4.800	5.510	8.1 km	–	catalog · MPC · JPL
546275 Kozák	30 October 2010	Z. Kuli	Piszkesteto	5.250	0.111	14.4	4.668	5.831	13 km	–	catalog · MPC · JPL
(546286) 2010 UF_{101}	31 October 2010	Z. Kuli	Piszkesteto	5.242	0.067	9.1	4.891	5.593	8.9 km	–	catalog · MPC · JPL
(546289) 2010 UL_{108}	30 October 2010	MLS	Mount Lemmon	5.174	0.056	9.0	4.882	5.465	7.6 km	–	catalog · MPC · JPL
(546304) 2010 UT_{117}	28 October 2010	MLS	Mount Lemmon	5.103	0.051	7.0	4.841	5.365	6.5 km	–	catalog · MPC · JPL
(546313) 2010 UG_{120}	31 October 2010	Spacewatch	Kitt Peak	5.183	0.086	10.2	4.738	5.627	6.8 km	–	catalog · MPC · JPL
(546314) 2010 UH_{120}	31 October 2010	Spacewatch	Kitt Peak	5.248	0.012	12.1	5.188	5.309	8.0 km	–	catalog · MPC · JPL
(546348) 2010 VU_{45}	29 October 2010	Spacewatch	Kitt Peak	5.165	0.163	9.8	4.325	6.006	8.3 km	–	catalog · MPC · JPL
(546354) 2010 VD_{54}	3 November 2010	MLS	Mount Lemmon	5.188	0.068	7.1	4.837	5.538	7.7 km	–	catalog · MPC · JPL
(546358) 2010 VD_{56}	18 July 2007	MLS	Mount Lemmon	5.156	0.066	3.4	4.814	5.497	7.4 km	–	catalog · MPC · JPL
(546365) 2010 VK_{60}	4 November 2010	MLS	Mount Lemmon	5.182	0.073	11.1	4.806	5.558	7.3 km	–	catalog · MPC · JPL
(546387) 2010 VA_{88}	6 November 2010	Spacewatch	Kitt Peak	5.152	0.121	5.9	4.528	5.777	7.9 km	–	catalog · MPC · JPL
(546396) 2010 VN_{95}	30 October 2010	Z. Kuli; K. Sárneczky	Piszkesteto	5.239	0.048	11.2	4.988	5.491	8.3 km	–	catalog · MPC · JPL
(546406) 2010 VD_{108}	12 October 2010	MLS	Mount Lemmon	5.189	0.115	6.8	4.593	5.784	7.2 km	–	catalog · MPC · JPL
(546419) 2010 VJ_{119}	17 October 2009	MLS	Mount Lemmon	5.119	0.026	8.4	4.985	5.252	6.9 km	–	catalog · MPC · JPL
(546443) 2010 VP_{147}	15 September 2009	Spacewatch	Kitt Peak	5.156	0.131	13.4	4.479	5.833	7.1 km	–	catalog · MPC · JPL
(546454) 2010 VD_{159}	8 November 2010	MLS	Mount Lemmon	5.128	0.066	8.4	4.790	5.467	7.2 km	–	catalog · MPC · JPL
(546458) 2010 VO_{163}	29 October 2010	Spacewatch	Kitt Peak	5.217	0.088	24.8	4.759	5.674	8.9 km	–	catalog · MPC · JPL
(546460) 2010 VF_{166}	31 October 2010	Spacewatch	Kitt Peak	5.229	0.100	6.6	4.707	5.751	6.6 km	–	catalog · MPC · JPL
(546461) 2010 VG_{166}	10 November 2010	MLS	Mount Lemmon	5.229	0.052	6.7	4.954	5.503	7.5 km	–	catalog · MPC · JPL
(546467) 2010 VE_{171}	26 October 2009	MLS	Mount Lemmon	5.263	0.020	14.7	5.157	5.369	10 km	–	catalog · MPC · JPL
(546468) 2010 VD_{172}	10 November 2010	MLS	Mount Lemmon	5.297	0.037	13.7	5.100	5.493	7.8 km	–	catalog · MPC · JPL
(546490) 2010 VR_{192}	30 October 2010	Spacewatch	Kitt Peak	5.186	0.076	10.4	4.792	5.580	9.9 km	–	catalog · MPC · JPL
(546491) 2010 VK_{193}	15 September 2009	Spacewatch	Kitt Peak	5.173	0.054	14.2	4.895	5.451	7.5 km	–	catalog · MPC · JPL
(546493) 2010 VC_{203}	18 September 2009	CSS	Catalina	5.106	0.081	17.5	4.691	5.522	10 km	–	catalog · MPC · JPL
(546512) 2010 VZ_{215}	18 October 2010	MLS	Mount Lemmon	5.222	0.191	8.4	4.224	6.221	8.2 km	–	catalog · MPC · JPL
(546525) 2010 VK_{225}	6 November 2010	MLS	Mount Lemmon	5.359	0.066	5.6	5.003	5.714	7.6 km	–	catalog · MPC · JPL
(546526) 2010 VM_{225}	1 November 2010	MLS	Mount Lemmon	5.200	0.070	2.5	4.836	5.565	7.3 km	–	catalog · MPC · JPL
(546527) 2010 VO_{225}	5 November 2010	MLS	Mount Lemmon	5.146	0.033	13.1	4.978	5.314	9.6 km	–	catalog · MPC · JPL
(546543) 2010 VB_{231}	1 November 2010	Spacewatch	Kitt Peak	5.239	0.112	16.6	4.653	5.824	8.9 km	–	catalog · MPC · JPL
(546573) 2010 VX_{243}	6 November 2010	MLS	Mount Lemmon	5.131	0.076	10.5	4.743	5.520	7.7 km	–	catalog · MPC · JPL
(546579) 2010 VT_{244}	17 January 2013	Pan-STARRS 1	Haleakala	5.258	0.044	9.1	5.024	5.491	6.6 km	–	catalog · MPC · JPL
(546585) 2010 VM_{246}	18 November 2011	Spacewatch	Kitt Peak	5.227	0.054	12.9	4.944	5.511	9.6 km	–	catalog · MPC · JPL
(546587) 2010 VK_{247}	5 February 2013	MLS	Mount Lemmon	5.204	0.062	10.0	4.883	5.525	7.4 km	–	catalog · MPC · JPL
(546588) 2010 VO_{247}	12 November 2010	Spacewatch	Kitt Peak	5.234	0.148	8.2	4.458	6.009	7.1 km	–	catalog · MPC · JPL
(546590) 2010 VE_{249}	1 November 2010	Spacewatch	Kitt Peak	5.121	0.070	8.2	4.762	5.481	6.6 km	–	catalog · MPC · JPL
(546592) 2010 VG_{249}	2 November 2010	MLS	Mount Lemmon	5.112	0.081	8.5	4.696	5.528	6.5 km	–	catalog · MPC · JPL
(546593) 2010 VJ_{249}	7 November 2010	Spacewatch	Kitt Peak	5.158	0.084	6.7	4.726	5.591	8.0 km	–	catalog · MPC · JPL
(546594) 2010 VL_{249}	12 November 2010	Spacewatch	Kitt Peak	5.147	0.101	8.7	4.630	5.665	7.0 km	–	catalog · MPC · JPL
(546618) 2010 WT_{10}	22 September 2009	Spacewatch	Kitt Peak	5.331	0.059	2.3	5.014	5.647	7.5 km	–	catalog · MPC · JPL
(546623) 2010 WE_{13}	12 November 2010	MLS	Mount Lemmon	5.200	0.101	10.3	4.674	5.727	9.4 km	–	catalog · MPC · JPL
(546627) 2010 WX_{14}	17 September 2009	Spacewatch	Kitt Peak	5.277	0.097	14.5	4.763	5.790	8.6 km	–	catalog · MPC · JPL
(546636) 2010 WM_{31}	17 September 2009	Spacewatch	Kitt Peak	5.198	0.022	9.6	5.084	5.313	8.6 km	–	catalog · MPC · JPL
(546653) 2010 WJ_{41}	21 September 2009	Spacewatch	Kitt Peak	5.167	0.057	6.8	4.871	5.462	6.6 km	–	catalog · MPC · JPL
(546654) 2010 WM_{42}	7 November 2010	Spacewatch	Kitt Peak	5.239	0.095	9.4	4.739	5.738	7.7 km	–	catalog · MPC · JPL
(546667) 2010 WW_{56}	8 November 2010	MLS	Mount Lemmon	5.270	0.193	13.6	4.254	6.285	7.7 km	–	catalog · MPC · JPL
(546668) 2010 WY_{56}	8 November 2010	MLS	Mount Lemmon	5.166	0.050	13.7	4.906	5.426	8.5 km	–	catalog · MPC · JPL
(546689) 2010 WY_{76}	4 January 2013	Spacewatch	Kitt Peak	5.194	0.075	8.2	4.806	5.583	7.9 km	–	catalog · MPC · JPL
(546690) 2010 WM_{77}	27 November 2010	MLS	Mount Lemmon	5.193	0.053	14.8	4.919	5.467	7.9 km	–	catalog · MPC · JPL
(546691) 2010 WP_{77}	27 November 2010	MLS	Mount Lemmon	5.143	0.046	14.4	4.907	5.379	6.6 km	–	catalog · MPC · JPL
(546692) 2010 WA_{78}	18 January 2013	MLS	Mount Lemmon	5.201	0.032	5.9	5.037	5.366	6.5 km	–	catalog · MPC · JPL
(546693) 2010 WF_{78}	17 November 2010	Spacewatch	Kitt Peak	5.266	0.078	8.9	4.854	5.679	9.0 km	–	catalog · MPC · JPL
(546715) 2010 XT_{25}	4 November 2010	L. Elenin	Mayhill-ISON	5.094	0.037	28.7	4.908	5.281	11 km	–	catalog · MPC · JPL
(546743) 2010 XG_{59}	8 December 2010	Spacewatch	Kitt Peak	5.180	0.095	9.8	4.690	5.671	6.6 km	–	catalog · MPC · JPL
(546752) 2010 XO_{67}	14 November 2010	MLS	Mount Lemmon	5.277	0.075	8.6	4.882	5.673	7.3 km	–	catalog · MPC · JPL
(546760) 2010 XQ_{75}	22 September 2009	MLS	Mount Lemmon	5.178	0.088	8.2	4.721	5.635	8.5 km	–	catalog · MPC · JPL
(546777) 2010 XF_{91}	6 November 2010	MLS	Mount Lemmon	5.271	0.084	4.9	4.826	5.716	6.7 km	–	catalog · MPC · JPL
(546778) 2010 XG_{91}	10 November 2010	MLS	Mount Lemmon	5.336	0.048	12.4	5.080	5.593	7.7 km	–	catalog · MPC · JPL
(546779) 2010 XH_{91}	14 January 2012	MLS	Mount Lemmon	5.206	0.105	8.0	4.661	5.752	7.4 km	–	catalog · MPC · JPL
(546780) 2010 XN_{91}	9 February 2013	Pan-STARRS 1	Haleakala	5.245	0.101	11.3	4.712	5.777	8.1 km	–	catalog · MPC · JPL
(546781) 2010 XR_{91}	30 November 2010	MLS	Mount Lemmon	5.249	0.046	12.3	5.009	5.490	11 km	–	catalog · MPC · JPL
(546808) 2010 XA_{102}	10 April 2016	Pan-STARRS 1	Haleakala	5.150	0.163	17.4	4.313	5.987	7.6 km	–	catalog · MPC · JPL
(546818) 2010 XK_{105}	14 December 2010	MLS	Mount Lemmon	5.139	0.056	16.6	4.853	5.425	8.2 km	–	catalog · MPC · JPL
(546820) 2010 XO_{105}	5 December 2010	MLS	Mount Lemmon	5.209	0.092	14.3	4.729	5.689	8.9 km	–	catalog · MPC · JPL
(546825) 2010 XM_{106}	1 December 2010	MLS	Mount Lemmon	5.259	0.113	9.8	4.665	5.852	6.8 km	–	catalog · MPC · JPL
(546826) 2010 XJ_{108}	2 December 2010	MLS	Mount Lemmon	5.195	0.037	10.3	5.000	5.389	6.0 km	–	catalog · MPC · JPL
(546827) 2010 XB_{109}	6 December 2010	MLS	Mount Lemmon	5.139	0.028	8.2	4.996	5.282	6.8 km	–	catalog · MPC · JPL
(546829) 2010 XL_{109}	6 December 2010	MLS	Mount Lemmon	5.246	0.031	12.2	5.084	5.407	7.4 km	–	catalog · MPC · JPL
(546840) 2010 YR_{6}	25 December 2010	MLS	Mount Lemmon	5.178	0.068	14.1	4.826	5.530	7.9 km	–	catalog · MPC · JPL
(547845) 2010 VY_{254}	8 November 2010	Spacewatch	Kitt Peak	5.154	0.092	8.6	4.678	5.630	7.2 km	–	catalog · MPC · JPL
(547884) 2010 WA_{54}	15 July 2004	Cerro Tololo	Cerro Tololo	5.195	0.089	15.2	4.734	5.656	8.5 km	–	catalog · MPC · JPL
(547888) 2010 WL_{68}	22 September 2009	MLS	Mount Lemmon	5.253	0.067	5.7	4.901	5.604	7.8 km	–	catalog · MPC · JPL
(547957) 2010 XS_{111}	3 December 2010	MLS	Mount Lemmon	5.287	0.034	8.7	5.105	5.468	7.5 km	–	catalog · MPC · JPL
(548819) 2010 VP_{225}	25 January 2014	Pan-STARRS 1	Haleakala	5.156	0.065	18.7	4.823	5.490	7.3 km	–	catalog · MPC · JPL
(548831) 2010 VW_{245}	12 November 2010	MLS	Mount Lemmon	5.209	0.052	15.1	4.940	5.477	7.8 km	–	catalog · MPC · JPL
(549998) 2011 WW_{135}	25 November 2011	Pan-STARRS 1	Haleakala	5.175	0.104	11.5	4.639	5.711	9.2 km	–	catalog · MPC · JPL
(550015) 2011 WZ_{167}	24 November 2011	MLS	Mount Lemmon	5.158	0.132	10.3	4.476	5.841	6.4 km	–	catalog · MPC · JPL
(550041) 2011 YT_{14}	25 December 2011	L. Bernasconi	Les Engarouines	5.195	0.136	16.3	4.487	5.904	8.6 km	–	catalog · MPC · JPL
(550064) 2011 YD_{68}	31 December 2011	Spacewatch	Kitt Peak	5.264	0.038	30.4	5.065	5.463	9.2 km	–	catalog · MPC · JPL
(550088) 2011 YJ_{89}	29 December 2011	MLS	Mount Lemmon	5.214	0.055	34.2	4.928	5.501	8.4 km	–	catalog · MPC · JPL
(550106) 2012 AH_{30}	2 January 2012	Spacewatch	Kitt Peak	5.299	0.016	28.8	5.216	5.382	8.0 km	–	catalog · MPC · JPL
(550916) 2012 UN_{34}	20 October 2012	MLS	Mount Lemmon	5.254	0.057	26.7	4.956	5.552	13 km	–	catalog · MPC · JPL
(551215) 2012 YS_{9}	16 September 2009	Spacewatch	Kitt Peak	5.180	0.092	6.1	4.704	5.656	5.9 km	–	catalog · MPC · JPL
(551218) 2012 YB_{13}	23 December 2012	Pan-STARRS 1	Haleakala	5.186	0.010	20.9	5.136	5.236	7.6 km	–	catalog · MPC · JPL
(551262) 2013 AE_{68}	23 December 2012	Pan-STARRS 1	Haleakala	5.125	0.053	19.4	4.855	5.395	7.8 km	–	catalog · MPC · JPL
(551276) 2013 AH_{91}	13 October 2010	MLS	Mount Lemmon	5.116	0.093	7.3	4.643	5.590	6.6 km	–	catalog · MPC · JPL
(551279) 2013 AF_{94}	1 November 2010	MLS	Mount Lemmon	5.280	0.021	17.5	5.169	5.391	13 km	–	catalog · MPC · JPL
(551301) 2013 AM_{129}	10 January 2013	Pan-STARRS 1	Haleakala	5.207	0.069	32.7	4.849	5.564	8.8 km	–	catalog · MPC · JPL
(551302) 2013 AN_{131}	6 January 2013	Spacewatch	Kitt Peak	5.230	0.038	20.7	5.030	5.429	8.4 km	–	catalog · MPC · JPL
(551303) 2013 AS_{131}	7 September 2008	MLS	Mount Lemmon	5.185	0.149	8.2	4.411	5.959	7.8 km	–	catalog · MPC · JPL
(551304) 2013 AH_{133}	12 March 2002	NEAT	Palomar	5.177	0.029	8.2	5.025	5.329	12 km	–	catalog · MPC · JPL
(551320) 2013 BC	22 December 2012	Pan-STARRS 1	Haleakala	5.178	0.031	16.5	5.015	5.341	8.3 km	–	catalog · MPC · JPL
(551321) 2013 BQ	27 September 2012	Pan-STARRS 1	Haleakala	5.234	0.087	11.9	4.777	5.691	7.7 km	–	catalog · MPC · JPL
(551322) 2013 BJ_{1}	8 December 2012	Spacewatch	Kitt Peak	5.248	0.048	13.5	4.998	5.499	8.6 km	–	catalog · MPC · JPL
(551332) 2013 BZ_{17}	16 January 2013	MLS	Mount Lemmon	5.183	0.044	30.2	4.954	5.413	9.2 km	–	catalog · MPC · JPL
(551340) 2013 BH_{31}	17 October 2010	MLS	Mount Lemmon	5.196	0.072	8.7	4.823	5.569	7.4 km	–	catalog · MPC · JPL
(551406) 2013 CQ_{85}	9 January 2013	Spacewatch	Kitt Peak	5.258	0.073	10.9	4.876	5.641	7.3 km	–	catalog · MPC · JPL
(551417) 2013 CQ_{104}	5 November 2010	MLS	Mount Lemmon	5.213	0.180	6.6	4.272	6.154	6.2 km	–	catalog · MPC · JPL
(553813) 2011 WT_{175}	26 November 2011	MLS	Mount Lemmon	5.219	0.178	24.7	4.291	6.146	9.2 km	–	catalog · MPC · JPL
(554839) 2013 CW_{139}	14 February 2013	Spacewatch	Kitt Peak	5.166	0.019	8.5	5.068	5.263	7.7 km	–	catalog · MPC · JPL
(554895) 2013 EQ_{140}	5 February 2013	MLS	Mount Lemmon	5.127	0.049	7.3	4.877	5.377	6.4 km	–	catalog · MPC · JPL
(554903) 2013 EW_{174}	18 October 2009	MLS	Mount Lemmon	5.202	0.046	0.7	4.964	5.440	6.2 km	–	catalog · MPC · JPL
(555843) 2014 EU_{243}	6 September 2008	Spacewatch	Kitt Peak	5.188	0.081	32.2	4.770	5.607	6.8 km	–	catalog · MPC · JPL
(559292) 2015 BU_{615}	28 January 2015	Pan-STARRS 1	Haleakala	5.143	0.067	17.1	4.796	5.490	6.6 km	–	catalog · MPC · JPL
(559663) 2015 DP_{134}	1 December 2010	MLS	Mount Lemmon	5.206	0.064	15.2	4.872	5.540	8.4 km	–	catalog · MPC · JPL
(560187) 2015 FD_{145}	28 September 2009	Spacewatch	Kitt Peak	5.135	0.074	8.1	4.757	5.513	6.9 km	–	catalog · MPC · JPL
(560470) 2015 FM_{393}	8 January 2013	MLS	Mount Lemmon	5.336	0.069	22.4	4.970	5.702	11 km	–	catalog · MPC · JPL
(560713) 2015 HB_{217}	18 April 2015	MLS	Mount Lemmon	5.350	0.033	12.1	5.175	5.524	7.3 km	–	catalog · MPC · JPL
(560802) 2015 KS_{149}	27 November 2010	MLS	Mount Lemmon	5.198	0.144	13.0	4.449	5.947	7.9 km	–	catalog · MPC · JPL
(567073) 2019 KX_{4}	23 October 2009	MLS	Mount Lemmon	5.173	0.060	26.9	4.860	5.486	10 km	–	catalog · MPC · JPL
(567329) 2001 BY_{84}	24 September 2009	T. V. Kryachko; B. Satovski	Zelenchukskaya Stn	5.151	0.132	19.6	4.469	5.833	8.5 km	–	catalog · MPC · JPL
(567349) 2001 DW_{119}	24 November 2009	MLS	Mount Lemmon	5.227	0.057	4.4	4.931	5.522	7.0 km	–	catalog · MPC · JPL
(570366) 2006 OS_{37}	1 October 2008	MLS	Mount Lemmon	5.282	0.038	3.0	5.083	5.480	6.9 km	–	catalog · MPC · JPL
(572576) 2008 RR_{147}	6 April 2003	Spacewatch	Kitt Peak	5.181	0.050	21.2	4.921	5.441	9.6 km	–	catalog · MPC · JPL
(572611) 2008 RK_{172}	3 September 2008	Spacewatch	Kitt Peak	5.255	0.125	3.0	4.599	5.910	6.1 km	–	catalog · MPC · JPL
(572622) 2008 SJ_{20}	5 April 2003	Spacewatch	Kitt Peak	5.171	0.039	6.1	4.971	5.372	7.8 km	–	catalog · MPC · JPL
(572659) 2008 SR_{185}	24 September 2008	W. Bickel	Bergisch Gladbach	5.246	0.091	9.6	4.768	5.724	7.5 km	–	catalog · MPC · JPL
(572688) 2008 SW_{273}	19 September 2008	Spacewatch	Kitt Peak	5.170	0.011	20.2	5.114	5.225	7.8 km	–	catalog · MPC · JPL
(572817) 2008 TG_{223}	8 October 2008	Spacewatch	Kitt Peak	5.278	0.045	4.6	5.039	5.517	6.8 km	–	catalog · MPC · JPL
(572818) 2008 TZ_{223}	1 October 2008	MLS	Mount Lemmon	5.252	0.168	12.5	4.372	6.132	5.7 km	–	catalog · MPC · JPL
(572826) 2008 UN_{8}	19 September 2008	Spacewatch	Kitt Peak	5.185	0.136	4.4	4.478	5.892	6.6 km	–	catalog · MPC · JPL
(572932) 2008 UU_{373}	21 August 2008	Spacewatch	Kitt Peak	5.252	0.023	13.7	5.133	5.370	11 km	–	catalog · MPC · JPL
(573692) 2009 RA_{17}	12 September 2009	Spacewatch	Kitt Peak	5.222	0.079	31.7	4.808	5.637	8.7 km	–	catalog · MPC · JPL
(573703) 2009 RR_{54}	1 April 2003	M. W. Buie; A. B. Jordan	Kitt Peak	5.177	0.041	16.0	4.963	5.392	8.9 km	–	catalog · MPC · JPL
(573704) 2009 RL_{68}	15 September 2009	Spacewatch	Kitt Peak	5.227	0.068	15.2	4.873	5.581	9.1 km	–	catalog · MPC · JPL
(573716) 2009 SV_{25}	26 April 2003	Spacewatch	Kitt Peak	5.160	0.102	32.2	4.633	5.687	9.9 km	–	catalog · MPC · JPL
(573755) 2009 SB_{247}	18 September 2009	Spacewatch	Kitt Peak	5.165	0.087	8.9	4.715	5.616	6.3 km	–	catalog · MPC · JPL
(573759) 2009 SV_{267}	17 September 2009	T. V. Kryachko; B. Satovski	Zelenchukskaya Stn	5.260	0.106	12.6	4.704	5.815	8.0 km	–	catalog · MPC · JPL
(573793) 2009 SG_{399}	20 September 2009	Spacewatch	Kitt Peak	5.140	0.132	31.8	4.464	5.816	9.3 km	–	catalog · MPC · JPL
(573808) 2009 TR_{53}	1 October 2009	MLS	Mount Lemmon	5.298	0.093	8.8	4.808	5.788	9.2 km	–	catalog · MPC · JPL
(573827) 2009 UQ_{56}	23 October 2009	MLS	Mount Lemmon	5.221	0.049	12.9	4.968	5.474	7.4 km	–	catalog · MPC · JPL
(573835) 2009 UW_{105}	21 October 2009	MLS	Mount Lemmon	5.288	0.075	30.8	4.891	5.685	9.3 km	–	catalog · MPC · JPL
(573841) 2009 UD_{142}	9 October 2008	MLS	Mount Lemmon	5.217	0.109	17.2	4.649	5.785	7.3 km	–	catalog · MPC · JPL
(573848) 2009 UO_{162}	23 October 2009	MLS	Mount Lemmon	5.271	0.011	25.7	5.214	5.327	9.9 km	–	catalog · MPC · JPL
(573855) 2009 UZ_{169}	2 November 2010	MLS	Mount Lemmon	5.196	0.092	10.8	4.717	5.675	8.5 km	–	catalog · MPC · JPL
(573880) 2009 VW_{52}	21 September 2009	MLS	Mount Lemmon	5.199	0.103	18.9	4.662	5.737	7.7 km	–	catalog · MPC · JPL
(573932) 2009 WU_{112}	23 October 2009	MLS	Mount Lemmon	5.259	0.026	17.5	5.124	5.394	11 km	–	catalog · MPC · JPL
(573963) 2009 WE_{186}	9 October 2008	MLS	Mount Lemmon	5.250	0.086	11.7	4.799	5.701	6.4 km	–	catalog · MPC · JPL
(573968) 2009 WC_{210}	18 November 2009	Spacewatch	Kitt Peak	5.282	0.016	5.8	5.196	5.367	8.0 km	–	catalog · MPC · JPL
(574685) 2010 UH_{50}	31 October 2010	Spacewatch	Kitt Peak	5.228	0.046	32.5	4.989	5.467	10 km	–	catalog · MPC · JPL
(574714) 2010 UC_{126}	29 October 2010	MLS	Mount Lemmon	5.142	0.076	13.7	4.751	5.532	7.7 km	–	catalog · MPC · JPL
(574751) 2010 VX_{202}	30 November 2011	Spacewatch	Kitt Peak	5.189	0.125	10.0	4.538	5.839	8.7 km	–	catalog · MPC · JPL
(574761) 2010 VN_{250}	24 November 1998	Spacewatch	Kitt Peak	5.245	0.084	13.5	4.803	5.687	7.3 km	–	catalog · MPC · JPL
(574764) 2010 VM_{251}	2 November 2010	MLS	Mount Lemmon	5.224	0.083	31.2	4.793	5.656	8.0 km	–	catalog · MPC · JPL
(574770) 2010 VN_{256}	8 November 2010	Spacewatch	Kitt Peak	5.254	0.088	13.0	4.790	5.717	9.0 km	–	catalog · MPC · JPL
(574773) 2010 VU_{262}	14 November 2010	MLS	Mount Lemmon	5.093	0.031	23.5	4.936	5.249	7.7 km	–	catalog · MPC · JPL
(574785) 2010 WA_{64}	3 September 2008	Spacewatch	Kitt Peak	5.132	0.035	4.1	4.951	5.313	6.0 km	–	catalog · MPC · JPL
(574831) 2010 XQ_{112}	13 December 2010	MLS	Mount Lemmon	5.193	0.059	10.4	4.888	5.499	6.9 km	–	catalog · MPC · JPL
(574832) 2010 XN_{113}	3 December 2010	MLS	Mount Lemmon	5.259	0.091	8.1	4.782	5.735	6.7 km	–	catalog · MPC · JPL
(574873) 2011 BQ_{24}	6 November 2010	Spacewatch	Kitt Peak	5.180	0.058	27.8	4.880	5.480	10 km	–	catalog · MPC · JPL
(575449) 2011 SG_{285}	19 September 2011	MLS	Mount Lemmon	5.269	0.051	17.0	5.000	5.539	13 km	–	catalog · MPC · JPL
(575885) 2011 WU_{148}	25 November 2011	Pan-STARRS 1	Haleakala	5.214	0.086	30.4	4.766	5.663	9.6 km	–	catalog · MPC · JPL
(575903) 2011 YJ	18 September 2009	Spacewatch	Kitt Peak	5.169	0.075	17.5	4.784	5.554	9.6 km	–	catalog · MPC · JPL
(575913) 2011 YN_{22}	24 November 2011	Pan-STARRS 1	Haleakala	5.218	0.076	30.3	4.823	5.613	10 km	–	catalog · MPC · JPL
(575968) 2012 AG_{26}	11 December 2012	Spacewatch	Kitt Peak	5.169	0.041	32.2	4.955	5.382	9.4 km	–	catalog · MPC · JPL
(575990) 2012 BO_{26}	7 September 2008	MLS	Mount Lemmon	5.258	0.118	13.5	4.638	5.878	7.3 km	–	catalog · MPC · JPL
(576717) 2012 UO_{34}	20 October 2012	MLS	Mount Lemmon	5.212	0.048	43.6	4.960	5.463	11 km	–	catalog · MPC · JPL
(576765) 2012 UP_{138}	21 October 2012	MLS	Mount Lemmon	5.152	0.032	31.1	4.988	5.316	11 km	–	catalog · MPC · JPL
(577059) 2013 AO_{29}	3 January 2013	Pan-STARRS 1	Haleakala	5.257	0.055	17.9	4.970	5.544	11 km	–	catalog · MPC · JPL
(577067) 2013 AZ_{35}	27 September 2012	Pan-STARRS 1	Haleakala	5.262	0.082	17.1	4.833	5.691	8.4 km	–	catalog · MPC · JPL
(577070) 2013 AH_{36}	5 November 2010	MLS	Mount Lemmon	5.082	0.053	12.8	4.815	5.350	8.0 km	–	catalog · MPC · JPL
(577139) 2013 AL_{129}	21 June 2007	MLS	Mount Lemmon	5.213	0.071	25.5	4.840	5.585	10 km	–	catalog · MPC · JPL
(577140) 2013 AL_{135}	5 January 2013	R. Holmes	Charleston	5.158	0.028	32.4	5.014	5.302	8.8 km	–	catalog · MPC · JPL
(577177) 2013 AM_{199}	10 January 2013	Pan-STARRS 1	Haleakala	5.105	0.077	19.9	4.714	5.496	7.0 km	–	catalog · MPC · JPL
(577188) 2013 BV_{16}	29 July 2008	MLS	Mount Lemmon	5.139	0.002	6.5	5.127	5.150	7.2 km	–	catalog · MPC · JPL
(577189) 2013 BD_{17}	29 July 2008	Spacewatch	Kitt Peak	5.117	0.068	7.2	4.768	5.466	6.9 km	–	catalog · MPC · JPL
(577210) 2013 BV_{50}	16 January 2013	Pan-STARRS 1	Haleakala	5.180	0.058	19.1	4.878	5.481	7.9 km	–	catalog · MPC · JPL
(577234) 2013 BC_{73}	30 December 2000	Spacewatch	Kitt Peak	5.174	0.077	10.0	4.776	5.572	7.3 km	–	catalog · MPC · JPL
(577295) 2013 CG_{87}	10 February 2013	Pan-STARRS 1	Haleakala	5.183	0.045	29.9	4.951	5.416	9.5 km	–	catalog · MPC · JPL
(577302) 2013 CM_{101}	28 September 2008	MLS	Mount Lemmon	5.159	0.075	6.0	4.771	5.548	7.3 km	–	catalog · MPC · JPL
(577325) 2013 CQ_{133}	19 September 2009	Spacewatch	Kitt Peak	5.132	0.089	8.8	4.675	5.589	7.0 km	–	catalog · MPC · JPL
(577362) 2013 CT_{196}	15 July 2004	Cerro Tololo	Cerro Tololo	5.257	0.042	6.8	5.037	5.476	8.6 km	–	catalog · MPC · JPL
(577383) 2013 CQ_{216}	14 October 2009	MLS	Mount Lemmon	5.244	0.072	3.7	4.868	5.620	7.1 km	–	catalog · MPC · JPL
(577385) 2013 CY_{221}	3 November 2010	Spacewatch	Kitt Peak	5.121	0.086	7.7	4.683	5.559	6.9 km	–	catalog · MPC · JPL
(578368) 2014 BX_{47}	23 January 2014	MLS	Mount Lemmon	5.176	0.044	13.6	4.948	5.404	7.7 km	–	catalog · MPC · JPL
(578411) 2014 CF_{19}	19 September 2009	Spacewatch	Kitt Peak	5.232	0.074	11.7	4.846	5.618	11 km	–	catalog · MPC · JPL
(578441) 2014 DY_{23}	4 January 2001	Spacewatch	Kitt Peak	5.244	0.057	6.8	4.944	5.544	9.5 km	–	catalog · MPC · JPL
(578636) 2014 EW_{37}	17 September 2009	MLS	Mount Lemmon	5.163	0.046	10.1	4.928	5.398	8.5 km	–	catalog · MPC · JPL
(578654) 2014 EV_{53}	23 February 2015	Pan-STARRS 1	Haleakala	5.274	0.049	27.9	5.015	5.533	6.8 km	–	catalog · MPC · JPL
(578689) 2014 ET_{175}	27 May 2017	Pan-STARRS 1	Haleakala	5.239	0.036	13.4	5.049	5.429	9.0 km	–	catalog · MPC · JPL
(578694) 2014 EO_{183}	17 September 2009	Spacewatch	Kitt Peak	5.213	0.041	7.4	4.999	5.427	8.0 km	–	catalog · MPC · JPL
(578784) 2014 FC_{63}	20 February 2002	Spacewatch	Kitt Peak	5.232	0.082	17.4	4.801	5.664	12 km	–	catalog · MPC · JPL
(579098) 2014 MB_{27}	4 April 2014	MLS	Mount Lemmon	5.283	0.043	29.6	5.056	5.510	8.5 km	–	catalog · MPC · JPL
(580900) 2015 DG_{273}	18 February 2015	Pan-STARRS 1	Haleakala	5.136	0.084	8.3	4.706	5.565	6.9 km	–	catalog · MPC · JPL
(581085) 2015 FV_{107}	3 September 2008	Spacewatch	Kitt Peak	5.178	0.097	10.6	4.676	5.680	9.3 km	–	catalog · MPC · JPL
(581096) 2015 FM_{124}	18 January 2013	Pan-STARRS 1	Haleakala	5.237	0.042	25.5	5.019	5.456	13 km	–	catalog · MPC · JPL
(581287) 2015 FY_{326}	8 November 2010	Spacewatch	Kitt Peak	5.232	0.067	10.0	4.882	5.582	8.2 km	–	catalog · MPC · JPL
(581330) 2015 FJ_{387}	29 July 2008	Spacewatch	Kitt Peak	5.206	0.047	21.9	4.961	5.451	8.2 km	–	catalog · MPC · JPL
(581370) 2015 FC_{437}	21 March 2015	Pan-STARRS 1	Haleakala	5.109	0.082	8.2	4.688	5.530	6.1 km	–	catalog · MPC · JPL
(581554) 2015 HP_{170}	6 May 2003	Spacewatch	Kitt Peak	5.244	0.133	18.4	4.546	5.942	12 km	–	catalog · MPC · JPL
(581564) 2015 HE_{182}	17 November 2011	Spacewatch	Kitt Peak	5.240	0.067	30.2	4.890	5.590	12 km	–	catalog · MPC · JPL
(581638) 2015 KV_{27}	9 October 2008	MLS	Mount Lemmon	5.241	0.015	18.0	5.164	5.319	9.2 km	–	catalog · MPC · JPL
(583556) 2016 JJ_{22}	30 October 2010	Spacewatch	Kitt Peak	5.147	0.106	17.7	4.602	5.692	7.9 km	–	catalog · MPC · JPL
(585434) 2018 NF_{23}	12 July 2018	Pan-STARRS 1	Haleakala	5.253	0.024	24.5	5.128	5.378	8.2 km	–	catalog · MPC · JPL
(585435) 2018 NU_{28}	12 July 2018	Pan-STARRS 1	Haleakala	5.183	0.057	14.1	4.888	5.478	6.3 km	–	catalog · MPC · JPL
(585843) 2019 KB_{5}	29 May 2019	Pan-STARRS 1	Haleakala	5.146	0.067	23.1	4.799	5.492	7.7 km	–	catalog · MPC · JPL
(585845) 2019 KK_{6}	12 April 2015	Pan-STARRS 1	Haleakala	5.184	0.018	28.5	5.088	5.279	8.6 km	–	catalog · MPC · JPL
(585847) 2019 KT_{6}	19 November 2009	MLS	Mount Lemmon	5.235	0.006	35.1	5.206	5.264	9.0 km	–	catalog · MPC · JPL
(585851) 2019 LM	22 September 2009	Spacewatch	Kitt Peak	5.098	0.051	27.0	4.841	5.356	6.5 km	–	catalog · MPC · JPL
(585862) 2019 PA_{1}	29 October 2010	MLS	Mount Lemmon	5.241	0.060	21.6	4.929	5.553	9.2 km	–	catalog · MPC · JPL
(585907) 2020 KN_{7}	26 November 2011	MLS	Mount Lemmon	5.140	0.079	24.0	4.732	5.548	7.5 km	–	catalog · MPC · JPL
(585915) 2020 SX_{64}	29 October 2008	MLS	Mount Lemmon	5.261	0.057	11.6	4.964	5.558	7.1 km	–	catalog · MPC · JPL
(585965) 2000 AH_{225}	12 January 2000	Spacewatch	Kitt Peak	5.257	0.071	13.8	4.884	5.630	7.3 km	–	catalog · MPC · JPL
(585968) 2000 AK_{258}	17 October 2010	MLS	Mount Lemmon	5.204	0.077	8.6	4.805	5.603	8.0 km	–	catalog · MPC · JPL
(585987) 2000 GH_{189}	4 April 2000	SDSS Collaboration	Apache Point	5.295	0.128	13.8	4.618	5.973	8.0 km	–	catalog · MPC · JPL
(586071) 2001 BX_{84}	1 December 2010	MLS	Mount Lemmon	5.086	0.089	21.0	4.634	5.538	8.7 km	–	catalog · MPC · JPL
(586089) 2001 DG_{117}	18 January 2013	MLS	Mount Lemmon	5.192	0.077	11.0	4.792	5.591	9.3 km	–	catalog · MPC · JPL
(586094) 2001 DL_{118}	15 November 1998	Spacewatch	Kitt Peak	5.171	0.060	12.9	4.860	5.482	8.2 km	–	catalog · MPC · JPL
(586194) 2002 CY_{315}	13 February 2002	Spacewatch	Kitt Peak	5.149	0.053	9.4	4.874	5.424	9.7 km	–	catalog · MPC · JPL
(586198) 2002 CQ_{323}	7 September 2008	CSS	Catalina	5.185	0.197	3.3	4.162	6.209	7.5 km	–	catalog · MPC · JPL
(586200) 2002 CZ_{325}	28 September 2009	MLS	Mount Lemmon	5.076	0.112	1.5	4.506	5.647	6.0 km	–	catalog · MPC · JPL
(586204) 2002 CB_{327}	10 April 2015	Pan-STARRS 1	Haleakala	5.164	0.019	17.6	5.065	5.262	6.6 km	–	catalog · MPC · JPL
(586225) 2002 EJ_{165}	12 October 2010	MLS	Mount Lemmon	5.209	0.091	5.2	4.735	5.683	8.2 km	–	catalog · MPC · JPL
(586236) 2002 FJ_{19}	18 March 2002	M. W. Buie; D. E. Trilling	Kitt Peak	5.275	0.010	6.6	5.223	5.328	6.2 km	–	catalog · MPC · JPL
(586240) 2002 FE_{42}	17 October 2010	MLS	Mount Lemmon	5.169	0.079	4.2	4.760	5.578	6.6 km	–	catalog · MPC · JPL
(586264) 2002 GL_{194}	20 January 2013	MLS	Mount Lemmon	5.153	0.030	17.3	4.996	5.310	7.0 km	–	catalog · MPC · JPL
(586375) 2003 DU_{22}	28 February 2003	Cerro Tololo	Cerro Tololo	5.138	0.086	7.1	4.696	5.581	6.8 km	–	catalog · MPC · JPL
(586386) 2003 FJ_{138}	14 December 2010	MLS	Mount Lemmon	5.231	0.154	9.0	4.425	6.036	8.1 km	–	catalog · MPC · JPL
(586392) 2003 GR_{57}	16 September 2009	Spacewatch	Kitt Peak	5.186	0.087	25.3	4.736	5.636	9.1 km	–	catalog · MPC · JPL
(586393) 2003 GS_{57}	7 April 2003	Spacewatch	Kitt Peak	5.237	0.066	29.3	4.893	5.581	12 km	–	catalog · MPC · JPL
(586410) 2003 HR_{60}	20 May 2004	Spacewatch	Kitt Peak	5.247	0.066	19.7	4.900	5.594	11 km	–	catalog · MPC · JPL
(586642) 2004 HR_{15}	16 April 2004	Spacewatch	Kitt Peak	5.187	0.091	4.5	4.717	5.656	7.6 km	–	catalog · MPC · JPL
(586644) 2004 HW_{72}	28 April 2004	Spacewatch	Kitt Peak	5.188	0.016	13.9	5.106	5.271	8.6 km	–	catalog · MPC · JPL
(586654) 2004 HX_{84}	11 September 2008	W. Bickel	Bergisch Gladbach	5.165	0.080	10.3	4.754	5.576	7.1 km	–	catalog · MPC · JPL
(586657) 2004 JB_{57}	2 December 2010	MLS	Mount Lemmon	5.196	0.079	6.9	4.785	5.608	7.5 km	–	catalog · MPC · JPL
(586662) 2004 LK_{26}	12 June 2004	Spacewatch	Kitt Peak	5.258	0.087	18.6	4.801	5.714	9.7 km	–	catalog · MPC · JPL
(586664) 2004 LQ_{32}	4 January 2013	Spacewatch	Kitt Peak	5.274	0.025	17.8	5.144	5.404	9.9 km	–	catalog · MPC · JPL
(586889) 2005 DK_{4}	16 January 2013	MLS	Mount Lemmon	5.203	0.039	6.5	4.999	5.407	6.6 km	–	catalog · MPC · JPL
(586960) 2005 JO_{172}	10 May 2005	M. W. Buie; L. H. Wasserman	Cerro Tololo	5.100	0.124	2.3	4.470	5.731	5.4 km	–	catalog · MPC · JPL
(587645) 2006 OK_{32}	22 October 2009	MLS	Mount Lemmon	5.337	0.071	2.4	4.960	5.715	6.3 km	–	catalog · MPC · JPL
(588136) 2007 MA_{30}	24 December 2011	MLS	Mount Lemmon	5.201	0.109	21.9	4.635	5.767	8.7 km	–	catalog · MPC · JPL
(588160) 2007 RZ_{158}	12 September 2007	MLS	Mount Lemmon	5.212	0.049	7.4	4.958	5.466	7.5 km	–	catalog · MPC · JPL
(588176) 2007 RJ_{264}	15 September 2007	MLS	Mount Lemmon	5.284	0.045	11.3	5.047	5.520	7.2 km	–	catalog · MPC · JPL
(588188) 2007 RX_{338}	10 January 2013	Pan-STARRS 1	Haleakala	5.160	0.059	10.3	4.856	5.464	8.5 km	–	catalog · MPC · JPL
(588196) 2007 RQ_{366}	11 September 2007	MLS	Mount Lemmon	5.209	0.016	7.5	5.126	5.292	6.8 km	–	catalog · MPC · JPL
(588202) 2007 SP_{25}	19 March 2001	SDSS Collaboration	Apache Point	5.299	0.068	14.4	4.941	5.657	10 km	–	catalog · MPC · JPL
(588209) 2007 TT_{13}	6 October 2007	W. Bickel	Bergisch Gladbach	5.290	0.104	13.2	4.743	5.838	8.3 km	–	catalog · MPC · JPL
(588263) 2007 TB_{460}	24 September 2008	Spacewatch	Kitt Peak	5.337	0.082	4.9	4.899	5.775	8.3 km	–	catalog · MPC · JPL
(588638) 2008 OW_{22}	6 February 2002	R. Millis; M. W. Buie	Kitt Peak	5.201	0.078	30.9	4.798	5.604	8.2 km	–	catalog · MPC · JPL
(588641) 2008 OA_{27}	9 February 2014	Spacewatch	Kitt Peak	5.144	0.038	12.6	4.950	5.338	7.2 km	–	catalog · MPC · JPL
(588644) 2008 OQ_{31}	29 July 2008	Spacewatch	Kitt Peak	5.236	0.099	7.9	4.715	5.757	7.4 km	–	catalog · MPC · JPL
(588647) 2008 PE_{20}	7 August 2008	Spacewatch	Kitt Peak	5.202	0.106	9.6	4.649	5.756	5.7 km	–	catalog · MPC · JPL
(588656) 2008 QF_{29}	26 August 2008	K. Sárneczky	Piszkesteto	5.304	0.066	7.0	4.951	5.656	7.7 km	–	catalog · MPC · JPL
(588663) 2008 RQ_{14}	4 September 2008	Spacewatch	Kitt Peak	5.195	0.015	6.9	5.115	5.274	7.1 km	–	catalog · MPC · JPL
(588668) 2008 RU_{62}	4 September 2008	Spacewatch	Kitt Peak	5.234	0.151	6.2	4.444	6.023	5.6 km	–	catalog · MPC · JPL
(588676) 2008 RE_{122}	3 September 2008	Spacewatch	Kitt Peak	5.184	0.060	19.2	4.872	5.496	8.0 km	–	catalog · MPC · JPL
(588677) 2008 RU_{123}	29 July 2008	Spacewatch	Kitt Peak	5.228	0.099	19.9	4.711	5.744	9.0 km	–	catalog · MPC · JPL
(588678) 2008 RP_{125}	7 September 2008	MLS	Mount Lemmon	5.306	0.062	17.2	4.976	5.636	9.7 km	–	catalog · MPC · JPL
(588679) 2008 RD_{126}	9 September 2008	Spacewatch	Kitt Peak	5.204	0.133	17.9	4.513	5.896	6.9 km	–	catalog · MPC · JPL
(588691) 2008 RO_{161}	3 September 2008	Spacewatch	Kitt Peak	5.082	0.048	31.3	4.840	5.323	7.4 km	–	catalog · MPC · JPL
(588693) 2008 RN_{162}	22 October 2009	MLS	Mount Lemmon	5.235	0.144	5.7	4.482	5.987	6.1 km	–	catalog · MPC · JPL
(588694) 2008 RQ_{162}	29 July 2008	MLS	Mount Lemmon	5.120	0.052	30.3	4.856	5.384	7.1 km	–	catalog · MPC · JPL
(588697) 2008 RO_{167}	10 September 2008	Spacewatch	Kitt Peak	5.258	0.055	3.8	4.968	5.549	6.4 km	–	catalog · MPC · JPL
(588698) 2008 RV_{169}	5 September 2008	Spacewatch	Kitt Peak	5.281	0.064	6.5	4.945	5.617	7.2 km	–	catalog · MPC · JPL
(588700) 2008 RG_{172}	7 September 2008	MLS	Mount Lemmon	5.180	0.060	7.5	4.871	5.490	7.0 km	–	catalog · MPC · JPL
(588702) 2008 RJ_{174}	3 September 2008	Spacewatch	Kitt Peak	5.280	0.046	34.4	5.039	5.522	8.2 km	–	catalog · MPC · JPL
(588708) 2008 SP_{22}	9 April 2003	Spacewatch	Kitt Peak	5.194	0.086	20.2	4.748	5.640	7.8 km	–	catalog · MPC · JPL
(588721) 2008 SD_{137}	23 September 2008	MLS	Mount Lemmon	5.226	0.078	6.1	4.820	5.633	6.8 km	–	catalog · MPC · JPL
(588724) 2008 SK_{146}	23 September 2008	Spacewatch	Kitt Peak	5.254	0.066	10.3	4.905	5.603	8.7 km	–	catalog · MPC · JPL
(588728) 2008 SM_{207}	27 September 2008	MLS	Mount Lemmon	5.190	0.083	20.2	4.760	5.620	7.8 km	–	catalog · MPC · JPL
(588733) 2008 SH_{232}	28 September 2008	MLS	Mount Lemmon	5.294	0.023	6.4	5.174	5.414	7.8 km	–	catalog · MPC · JPL
(588735) 2008 SE_{233}	28 September 2008	MLS	Mount Lemmon	5.252	0.064	4.7	4.918	5.586	6.4 km	–	catalog · MPC · JPL
(588738) 2008 SX_{273}	3 September 2008	Spacewatch	Kitt Peak	5.205	0.145	20.5	4.450	5.959	7.0 km	–	catalog · MPC · JPL
(588740) 2008 SB_{278}	28 September 2008	MLS	Mount Lemmon	5.197	0.072	6.6	4.822	5.573	7.8 km	–	catalog · MPC · JPL
(588750) 2008 SE_{325}	2 January 2012	MLS	Mount Lemmon	5.232	0.095	13.5	4.733	5.730	7.5 km	–	catalog · MPC · JPL
(588753) 2008 SW_{331}	25 September 2008	Spacewatch	Kitt Peak	5.306	0.008	12.7	5.263	5.349	9.1 km	–	catalog · MPC · JPL
(588761) 2008 SZ_{343}	24 September 2008	MLS	Mount Lemmon	5.351	0.048	10.9	5.093	5.609	7.6 km	–	catalog · MPC · JPL
(588763) 2008 SV_{348}	23 September 2008	Spacewatch	Kitt Peak	5.261	0.083	6.2	4.822	5.700	5.8 km	–	catalog · MPC · JPL
(588766) 2008 TT_{12}	1 October 2008	MLS	Mount Lemmon	5.292	0.079	12.7	4.877	5.708	7.2 km	–	catalog · MPC · JPL
(588781) 2008 TF_{194}	28 December 2011	Spacewatch	Kitt Peak	5.223	0.093	8.3	4.735	5.710	7.7 km	–	catalog · MPC · JPL
(588796) 2008 TZ_{211}	1 November 2010	Spacewatch	Kitt Peak	5.152	0.124	9.3	4.512	5.791	6.3 km	–	catalog · MPC · JPL
(588802) 2008 US_{1}	18 October 2008	P. Mortfield	Auberry	5.209	0.116	19.0	4.605	5.812	7.4 km	–	catalog · MPC · JPL
(588837) 2008 UL_{231}	8 October 2008	MLS	Mount Lemmon	5.224	0.082	5.9	4.794	5.655	6.5 km	–	catalog · MPC · JPL
(588861) 2008 UW_{376}	17 December 1999	Spacewatch	Kitt Peak	5.268	0.077	6.4	4.862	5.675	9.8 km	–	catalog · MPC · JPL
(589244) 2009 RK_{63}	14 September 2009	Spacewatch	Kitt Peak	5.211	0.094	31.4	4.722	5.700	12 km	–	catalog · MPC · JPL
(589246) 2009 RJ_{68}	15 September 2009	Spacewatch	Kitt Peak	5.298	0.096	18.2	4.788	5.808	9.2 km	–	catalog · MPC · JPL
(589250) 2009 RP_{79}	10 February 2016	Pan-STARRS 1	Haleakala	5.180	0.038	17.2	4.983	5.377	6.8 km	–	catalog · MPC · JPL
(589252) 2009 RJ_{81}	15 September 2009	Spacewatch	Kitt Peak	5.172	0.159	12.6	4.350	5.993	6.3 km	–	catalog · MPC · JPL
(589256) 2009 SQ_{27}	16 September 2009	Spacewatch	Kitt Peak	5.154	0.058	16.5	4.857	5.451	7.4 km	–	catalog · MPC · JPL
(589257) 2009 ST_{27}	16 September 2009	Spacewatch	Kitt Peak	5.126	0.091	28.4	4.659	5.594	8.0 km	–	catalog · MPC · JPL
(589258) 2009 SD_{28}	16 September 2009	Spacewatch	Kitt Peak	5.229	0.195	6.2	4.210	6.248	6.0 km	–	catalog · MPC · JPL
(589272) 2009 SN_{153}	12 September 2009	Spacewatch	Kitt Peak	5.234	0.071	21.7	4.863	5.606	8.0 km	–	catalog · MPC · JPL
(589274) 2009 SH_{160}	20 September 2009	Spacewatch	Kitt Peak	5.253	0.079	13.3	4.835	5.670	6.8 km	–	catalog · MPC · JPL
(589276) 2009 SM_{188}	21 September 2009	Spacewatch	Kitt Peak	5.130	0.073	8.8	4.756	5.505	6.8 km	–	catalog · MPC · JPL
(589277) 2009 SB_{190}	22 September 2009	Spacewatch	Kitt Peak	5.201	0.118	8.8	4.588	5.814	6.6 km	–	catalog · MPC · JPL
(589278) 2009 SK_{193}	18 September 2009	Spacewatch	Kitt Peak	5.199	0.097	17.3	4.693	5.705	6.8 km	–	catalog · MPC · JPL
(589279) 2009 SJ_{194}	22 September 2009	Spacewatch	Kitt Peak	5.053	0.041	3.3	4.848	5.258	6.5 km	–	catalog · MPC · JPL
(589284) 2009 SK_{246}	17 September 2009	Spacewatch	Kitt Peak	5.199	0.086	6.7	4.752	5.646	6.1 km	–	catalog · MPC · JPL
(589287) 2009 SA_{278}	25 September 2009	Spacewatch	Kitt Peak	5.151	0.056	12.5	4.860	5.441	8.2 km	–	catalog · MPC · JPL
(589289) 2009 SB_{296}	27 September 2009	MLS	Mount Lemmon	5.172	0.031	9.7	5.011	5.333	8.8 km	–	catalog · MPC · JPL
(589291) 2009 SV_{303}	16 September 2009	Spacewatch	Kitt Peak	5.189	0.102	25.8	4.662	5.716	7.4 km	–	catalog · MPC · JPL
(589292) 2009 SU_{307}	7 September 2008	MLS	Mount Lemmon	5.233	0.098	6.3	4.717	5.748	7.4 km	–	catalog · MPC · JPL
(589295) 2009 SY_{319}	20 September 2009	Spacewatch	Kitt Peak	5.292	0.008	4.8	5.251	5.333	6.7 km	–	catalog · MPC · JPL
(589299) 2009 SK_{372}	10 October 1997	Spacewatch	Kitt Peak	5.245	0.075	3.3	4.852	5.638	8.5 km	–	catalog · MPC · JPL
(589302) 2009 SY_{373}	29 September 2009	MLS	Mount Lemmon	5.282	0.082	8.6	4.851	5.713	9.9 km	–	catalog · MPC · JPL
(589306) 2009 SP_{375}	20 September 2009	Spacewatch	Kitt Peak	5.274	0.162	3.7	4.417	6.131	6.4 km	–	catalog · MPC · JPL
(589308) 2009 SX_{375}	2 November 2010	MLS	Mount Lemmon	5.186	0.086	9.7	4.743	5.630	8.2 km	–	catalog · MPC · JPL
(589311) 2009 SM_{380}	20 August 2009	Spacewatch	Kitt Peak	5.125	0.113	16.2	4.545	5.704	6.5 km	–	catalog · MPC · JPL
(589312) 2009 SL_{383}	17 January 2013	Spacewatch	Kitt Peak	5.184	0.047	8.7	4.938	5.430	8.3 km	–	catalog · MPC · JPL
(589315) 2009 SJ_{389}	29 September 2009	MLS	Mount Lemmon	5.131	0.084	8.6	4.697	5.564	7.5 km	–	catalog · MPC · JPL
(589316) 2009 SU_{389}	29 September 2009	MLS	Mount Lemmon	5.168	0.069	8.2	4.811	5.526	7.4 km	–	catalog · MPC · JPL
(589317) 2009 SC_{391}	26 November 2010	MLS	Mount Lemmon	5.213	0.063	7.5	4.887	5.540	6.1 km	–	catalog · MPC · JPL
(589318) 2009 SF_{391}	13 October 2010	MLS	Mount Lemmon	5.203	0.059	6.9	4.897	5.509	6.5 km	–	catalog · MPC · JPL
(589319) 2009 SL_{391}	20 September 2009	Spacewatch	Kitt Peak	5.177	0.080	8.4	4.766	5.589	5.6 km	–	catalog · MPC · JPL
(589320) 2009 SX_{391}	17 October 2010	MLS	Mount Lemmon	5.189	0.024	8.2	5.064	5.314	6.4 km	–	catalog · MPC · JPL
(589321) 2009 SJ_{392}	26 September 2009	Spacewatch	Kitt Peak	5.095	0.041	4.0	4.886	5.305	6.1 km	–	catalog · MPC · JPL
(589322) 2009 SO_{392}	17 September 2009	Spacewatch	Kitt Peak	5.120	0.043	8.0	4.902	5.339	7.2 km	–	catalog · MPC · JPL
(589324) 2009 SV_{396}	21 September 2009	MLS	Mount Lemmon	5.223	0.028	7.9	5.078	5.369	7.1 km	–	catalog · MPC · JPL
(589326) 2009 SG_{401}	18 September 2009	Spacewatch	Kitt Peak	5.268	0.020	8.0	5.160	5.376	7.5 km	–	catalog · MPC · JPL
(589327) 2009 SA_{402}	21 September 2009	MLS	Mount Lemmon	5.215	0.103	7.6	4.677	5.752	6.6 km	–	catalog · MPC · JPL
(589328) 2009 SV_{404}	21 September 2009	MLS	Mount Lemmon	5.146	0.080	7.6	4.734	5.558	6.5 km	–	catalog · MPC · JPL
(589329) 2009 SD_{405}	26 September 2009	Spacewatch	Kitt Peak	5.127	0.084	6.8	4.697	5.557	6.2 km	–	catalog · MPC · JPL
(589330) 2009 SS_{405}	21 September 2009	Spacewatch	Kitt Peak	5.228	0.153	12.0	4.428	6.027	5.9 km	–	catalog · MPC · JPL
(589331) 2009 SY_{405}	21 September 2009	MLS	Mount Lemmon	5.189	0.091	8.0	4.718	5.660	6.8 km	–	catalog · MPC · JPL
(589333) 2009 SC_{409}	16 September 2009	Spacewatch	Kitt Peak	5.171	0.102	8.4	4.641	5.700	5.8 km	–	catalog · MPC · JPL
(589334) 2009 SM_{412}	29 September 2009	Spacewatch	Kitt Peak	5.155	0.079	13.6	4.749	5.561	6.3 km	–	catalog · MPC · JPL
(589335) 2009 SN_{412}	26 September 2009	Spacewatch	Kitt Peak	5.253	0.070	17.6	4.886	5.620	6.9 km	–	catalog · MPC · JPL
(589336) 2009 SU_{412}	17 September 2009	MLS	Mount Lemmon	5.204	0.074	28.9	4.819	5.589	6.7 km	–	catalog · MPC · JPL
(589340) 2009 TX_{52}	13 November 2010	Spacewatch	Kitt Peak	5.234	0.068	20.1	4.875	5.592	8.8 km	–	catalog · MPC · JPL
(589342) 2009 TC_{55}	14 October 2009	MLS	Mount Lemmon	5.292	0.082	8.7	4.860	5.724	6.9 km	–	catalog · MPC · JPL
(589353) 2009 UM_{79}	22 October 2009	MLS	Mount Lemmon	5.257	0.124	7.7	4.605	5.910	6.1 km	–	catalog · MPC · JPL
(589358) 2009 UZ_{116}	22 October 2009	MLS	Mount Lemmon	5.243	0.064	13.6	4.910	5.577	7.1 km	–	catalog · MPC · JPL
(589366) 2009 UD_{162}	16 October 2009	MLS	Mount Lemmon	5.214	0.040	3.6	5.005	5.423	7.2 km	–	catalog · MPC · JPL
(589367) 2009 UF_{162}	2 November 2010	MLS	Mount Lemmon	5.213	0.098	5.8	4.704	5.722	7.0 km	–	catalog · MPC · JPL
(589369) 2009 UX_{171}	27 October 2009	MLS	Mount Lemmon	5.212	0.018	7.7	5.119	5.305	7.7 km	–	catalog · MPC · JPL
(589370) 2009 UB_{174}	16 October 2009	MLS	Mount Lemmon	5.241	0.039	8.4	5.036	5.446	6.4 km	–	catalog · MPC · JPL
(589371) 2009 UE_{174}	24 October 2009	Spacewatch	Kitt Peak	5.198	0.043	18.7	4.976	5.420	5.7 km	–	catalog · MPC · JPL
(589372) 2009 UE_{175}	21 October 2009	MLS	Mount Lemmon	5.175	0.012	31.0	5.116	5.235	6.6 km	–	catalog · MPC · JPL
(589374) 2009 UY_{176}	22 October 2009	MLS	Mount Lemmon	5.124	0.041	17.7	4.916	5.332	9.4 km	–	catalog · MPC · JPL
(589375) 2009 UP_{184}	25 October 2009	Spacewatch	Kitt Peak	5.221	0.076	9.4	4.823	5.618	6.3 km	–	catalog · MPC · JPL
(589402) 2009 WP_{47}	15 September 2009	Spacewatch	Kitt Peak	5.316	0.055	12.1	5.024	5.609	8.9 km	–	catalog · MPC · JPL
(589419) 2009 WA_{142}	8 September 1996	Spacewatch	Kitt Peak	5.175	0.091	7.6	4.704	5.645	6.3 km	–	catalog · MPC · JPL
(589420) 2009 WQ_{149}	6 October 2008	MLS	Mount Lemmon	5.114	0.039	6.6	4.912	5.316	7.4 km	–	catalog · MPC · JPL
(589421) 2009 WF_{150}	14 October 2009	MLS	Mount Lemmon	5.282	0.068	22.0	4.924	5.640	8.7 km	–	catalog · MPC · JPL
(589434) 2009 WQ_{231}	12 October 2009	MLS	Mount Lemmon	5.141	0.161	20.8	4.316	5.966	8.0 km	–	catalog · MPC · JPL
(589499) 2010 BZ_{133}	8 November 2010	MLS	Mount Lemmon	5.244	0.104	24.2	4.697	5.791	9.3 km	–	catalog · MPC · JPL
(589500) 2010 BA_{145}	15 April 2016	Pan-STARRS 1	Haleakala	5.189	0.087	16.3	4.739	5.638	6.6 km	–	catalog · MPC · JPL
(589834) 2010 TY_{215}	12 October 2010	MLS	Mount Lemmon	5.141	0.085	8.9	4.705	5.577	6.5 km	–	catalog · MPC · JPL
(589864) 2010 UE_{123}	30 October 2010	Spacewatch	Kitt Peak	5.190	0.065	15.5	4.853	5.526	7.2 km	–	catalog · MPC · JPL
(589866) 2010 VO_{5}	1 November 2010	MLS	Mount Lemmon	5.112	0.045	18.5	4.880	5.344	6.5 km	–	catalog · MPC · JPL
(589868) 2010 VL_{19}	2 November 2010	Spacewatch	Kitt Peak	5.165	0.079	9.7	4.759	5.571	6.4 km	–	catalog · MPC · JPL
(589870) 2010 VK_{24}	1 November 2010	Spacewatch	Kitt Peak	5.208	0.070	1.1	4.845	5.571	7.2 km	–	catalog · MPC · JPL
(589877) 2010 VR_{52}	14 October 2009	MLS	Mount Lemmon	5.199	0.069	5.8	4.840	5.558	6.6 km	–	catalog · MPC · JPL
(589879) 2010 VY_{69}	5 November 2010	Spacewatch	Kitt Peak	5.280	0.100	8.2	4.751	5.808	7.5 km	–	catalog · MPC · JPL
(589881) 2010 VQ_{93}	15 September 2009	Spacewatch	Kitt Peak	5.131	0.092	2.1	4.658	5.604	5.7 km	–	catalog · MPC · JPL
(589882) 2010 VE_{107}	6 November 2010	Spacewatch	Kitt Peak	5.246	0.048	6.8	4.995	5.498	6.9 km	–	catalog · MPC · JPL
(589885) 2010 VW_{114}	23 September 1995	Spacewatch	Kitt Peak	5.259	0.006	11.8	5.226	5.292	9.5 km	–	catalog · MPC · JPL
(589886) 2010 VO_{115}	7 November 2010	MLS	Mount Lemmon	5.194	0.138	11.5	4.475	5.912	7.5 km	–	catalog · MPC · JPL
(589896) 2010 VM_{164}	10 November 2010	MLS	Mount Lemmon	5.262	0.064	20.1	4.923	5.601	9.6 km	–	catalog · MPC · JPL
(589902) 2010 VQ_{192}	11 November 2010	Spacewatch	Kitt Peak	5.147	0.105	9.9	4.605	5.690	6.6 km	–	catalog · MPC · JPL
(589909) 2010 VB_{225}	16 October 2009	MLS	Mount Lemmon	5.234	0.056	9.1	4.939	5.529	5.4 km	–	catalog · MPC · JPL
(589924) 2010 VU_{253}	22 October 2009	MLS	Mount Lemmon	5.248	0.084	14.9	4.807	5.688	7.2 km	–	catalog · MPC · JPL
(589927) 2010 VM_{254}	1 November 2010	MLS	Mount Lemmon	5.203	0.036	4.5	5.017	5.389	7.2 km	–	catalog · MPC · JPL
(589930) 2010 VR_{254}	5 November 2010	MLS	Mount Lemmon	5.139	0.092	8.2	4.665	5.613	6.2 km	–	catalog · MPC · JPL
(589931) 2010 VB_{255}	12 November 2010	MLS	Mount Lemmon	5.182	0.125	19.9	4.536	5.829	8.0 km	–	catalog · MPC · JPL
(589932) 2010 VC_{255}	3 November 2010	MLS	Mount Lemmon	5.163	0.078	4.3	4.760	5.567	6.8 km	–	catalog · MPC · JPL
(589934) 2010 VY_{257}	12 November 2010	MLS	Mount Lemmon	5.177	0.095	21.5	4.683	5.670	7.4 km	–	catalog · MPC · JPL
(589935) 2010 VJ_{259}	13 November 2010	MLS	Mount Lemmon	5.156	0.047	13.9	4.915	5.396	7.9 km	–	catalog · MPC · JPL
(589937) 2010 VX_{261}	14 November 2010	MLS	Mount Lemmon	5.214	0.143	15.1	4.468	5.959	5.8 km	–	catalog · MPC · JPL
(589938) 2010 VV_{262}	8 November 2010	MLS	Mount Lemmon	5.273	0.041	19.2	5.055	5.490	7.9 km	–	catalog · MPC · JPL
(589939) 2010 VA_{263}	13 November 2010	MLS	Mount Lemmon	5.141	0.072	6.1	4.772	5.511	6.0 km	–	catalog · MPC · JPL
(589940) 2010 VJ_{263}	1 November 2010	MLS	Mount Lemmon	5.107	0.075	5.2	4.723	5.490	7.1 km	–	catalog · MPC · JPL
(589945) 2010 WU_{4}	11 November 2010	MLS	Mount Lemmon	5.220	0.168	17.0	4.344	6.096	7.3 km	–	catalog · MPC · JPL
(589947) 2010 WK_{7}	11 November 2010	Spacewatch	Kitt Peak	5.304	0.098	6.2	4.784	5.825	7.0 km	–	catalog · MPC · JPL
(589948) 2010 WK_{10}	1 April 2003	SDSS Collaboration	Apache Point	5.289	0.075	23.7	4.894	5.684	10 km	–	catalog · MPC · JPL
(589951) 2010 WM_{43}	27 November 2010	MLS	Mount Lemmon	5.252	0.048	8.9	4.999	5.505	7.1 km	–	catalog · MPC · JPL
(589958) 2010 WP_{79}	25 November 2010	MLS	Mount Lemmon	5.188	0.101	7.4	4.662	5.715	6.3 km	–	catalog · MPC · JPL
(589962) 2010 XP_{34}	2 December 2010	MLS	Mount Lemmon	5.126	0.074	8.7	4.744	5.508	6.8 km	–	catalog · MPC · JPL
(589964) 2010 XX_{40}	4 December 2010	Z. Kuli; K. Sárneczky	Piszkesteto	5.181	0.143	28.0	4.439	5.923	7.4 km	–	catalog · MPC · JPL
(589968) 2010 XQ_{53}	1 November 2010	Spacewatch	Kitt Peak	5.217	0.125	20.9	4.566	5.868	8.8 km	–	catalog · MPC · JPL
(589971) 2010 XB_{91}	2 November 2010	MLS	Mount Lemmon	5.175	0.066	13.2	4.832	5.518	6.7 km	–	catalog · MPC · JPL
(590207) 2011 TD_{2}	13 October 2010	MLS	Mount Lemmon	5.169	0.191	19.5	4.179	6.158	12 km	–	catalog · MPC · JPL
(590352) 2011 WV_{123}	1 November 2011	MLS	Mount Lemmon	5.264	0.047	21.4	5.018	5.511	10 km	–	catalog · MPC · JPL
(590364) 2011 WR_{157}	29 October 2010	Spacewatch	Kitt Peak	5.219	0.045	10.5	4.986	5.453	8.6 km	–	catalog · MPC · JPL
(590375) 2011 XW_{6}	6 December 2011	Pan-STARRS 1	Haleakala	5.224	0.066	14.5	4.879	5.570	6.4 km	–	catalog · MPC · JPL
(590376) 2011 YB_{1}	24 November 2011	MLS	Mount Lemmon	5.300	0.063	15.1	4.965	5.635	11 km	–	catalog · MPC · JPL
(590379) 2011 YM_{6}	29 July 2008	MLS	Mount Lemmon	5.176	0.092	9.7	4.702	5.650	7.0 km	–	catalog · MPC · JPL
(590389) 2011 YL_{47}	28 December 2011	M. Ory	Oukaimeden	5.134	0.060	10.8	4.826	5.442	7.9 km	–	catalog · MPC · JPL
(590401) 2011 YK_{72}	29 December 2011	Spacewatch	Kitt Peak	5.180	0.074	20.2	4.798	5.563	9.5 km	–	catalog · MPC · JPL
(590404) 2011 YP_{79}	10 January 2013	Pan-STARRS 1	Haleakala	5.262	0.104	18.7	4.712	5.812	8.0 km	–	catalog · MPC · JPL
(590414) 2011 YF_{88}	29 December 2011	MLS	Mount Lemmon	5.285	0.099	17.8	4.764	5.807	8.4 km	–	catalog · MPC · JPL
(590417) 2011 YY_{88}	24 December 2011	MLS	Mount Lemmon	5.177	0.134	16.3	4.484	5.871	8.8 km	–	catalog · MPC · JPL
(590418) 2011 YH_{89}	27 December 2011	Spacewatch	Kitt Peak	5.271	0.072	19.7	4.894	5.649	8.9 km	–	catalog · MPC · JPL
(590419) 2011 YA_{90}	18 June 2018	Pan-STARRS 1	Haleakala	5.233	0.091	18.8	4.754	5.711	7.3 km	–	catalog · MPC · JPL
(590421) 2011 YP_{90}	31 December 2011	Spacewatch	Kitt Peak	5.247	0.087	8.5	4.790	5.703	6.5 km	–	catalog · MPC · JPL
(590422) 2011 YK_{91}	26 December 2011	Spacewatch	Kitt Peak	5.237	0.127	11.7	4.573	5.901	6.9 km	–	catalog · MPC · JPL
(590426) 2011 YF_{94}	27 December 2011	MLS	Mount Lemmon	5.174	0.103	15.3	4.640	5.708	7.4 km	–	catalog · MPC · JPL
(590430) 2012 AV_{7}	9 September 2008	MLS	Mount Lemmon	5.195	0.067	7.7	4.847	5.543	8.0 km	–	catalog · MPC · JPL
(590435) 2012 AJ_{16}	27 December 2011	MLS	Mount Lemmon	5.318	0.033	22.2	5.142	5.493	8.2 km	–	catalog · MPC · JPL
(590438) 2012 AU_{21}	3 January 2012	MLS	Mount Lemmon	5.296	0.073	23.0	4.908	5.684	8.3 km	–	catalog · MPC · JPL
(590450) 2012 BY_{23}	27 December 2011	Spacewatch	Kitt Peak	5.111	0.059	14.9	4.810	5.412	7.5 km	–	catalog · MPC · JPL
(590460) 2012 BX_{49}	27 December 2011	MLS	Mount Lemmon	5.247	0.195	6.1	4.224	6.271	5.6 km	–	catalog · MPC · JPL
(590465) 2012 BW_{60}	24 January 2012	Pan-STARRS 1	Haleakala	5.244	0.092	20.3	4.760	5.729	7.4 km	–	catalog · MPC · JPL
(590466) 2012 BK_{61}	30 September 2009	MLS	Mount Lemmon	5.209	0.158	15.1	4.385	6.034	6.9 km	–	catalog · MPC · JPL
(590483) 2012 BX_{96}	2 December 2010	MLS	Mount Lemmon	5.211	0.083	10.1	4.781	5.642	6.8 km	–	catalog · MPC · JPL
(590485) 2012 BO_{97}	2 September 2008	Spacewatch	Kitt Peak	5.136	0.058	1.2	4.838	5.434	6.2 km	–	catalog · MPC · JPL
(590492) 2012 BH_{118}	27 January 2012	MLS	Mount Lemmon	5.285	0.123	8.1	4.633	5.938	6.4 km	–	catalog · MPC · JPL
(590494) 2012 BV_{123}	28 January 2012	Pan-STARRS 1	Haleakala	5.237	0.097	17.8	4.729	5.744	7.4 km	–	catalog · MPC · JPL
(590524) 2012 BQ_{179}	27 January 2012	MLS	Mount Lemmon	5.245	0.053	6.7	4.966	5.525	6.2 km	–	catalog · MPC · JPL
(590525) 2012 BD_{180}	30 January 2012	MLS	Mount Lemmon	5.255	0.075	16.9	4.858	5.652	7.3 km	–	catalog · MPC · JPL
(590811) 2012 TN_{297}	15 October 2012	Spacewatch	Kitt Peak	5.224	0.156	19.7	4.409	6.039	13 km	–	catalog · MPC · JPL
(590942) 2012 YE_{1}	25 November 2011	Pan-STARRS 1	Haleakala	5.176	0.059	15.3	4.868	5.483	9.1 km	–	catalog · MPC · JPL
(590944) 2012 YT_{9}	10 January 2014	MLS	Mount Lemmon	5.217	0.045	26.6	4.982	5.452	7.7 km	–	catalog · MPC · JPL
(590952) 2013 AU_{35}	25 November 2011	Pan-STARRS 1	Haleakala	5.184	0.011	8.8	5.125	5.243	8.7 km	–	catalog · MPC · JPL
(590958) 2013 AU_{88}	14 January 2013	ESA OGS	ESA OGS	5.127	0.126	17.0	4.480	5.774	9.8 km	–	catalog · MPC · JPL
(590959) 2013 AD_{90}	13 December 2010	MLS	Mount Lemmon	5.246	0.072	9.2	4.867	5.625	7.0 km	–	catalog · MPC · JPL
(590963) 2013 AH_{94}	17 February 2001	AMOS	Haleakala	5.227	0.075	32.6	4.836	5.618	12 km	–	catalog · MPC · JPL
(590969) 2013 AQ_{103}	5 January 2013	MLS	Mount Lemmon	5.229	0.089	15.3	4.762	5.696	10 km	–	catalog · MPC · JPL
(590970) 2013 AO_{106}	10 January 2013	Pan-STARRS 1	Haleakala	5.173	0.040	25.2	4.966	5.380	7.8 km	–	catalog · MPC · JPL
(590971) 2013 AE_{109}	10 May 2005	M. W. Buie; L. H. Wasserman	Cerro Tololo	5.107	0.060	3.5	4.802	5.413	7.0 km	–	catalog · MPC · JPL
(590972) 2013 AC_{112}	5 January 2013	Spacewatch	Kitt Peak	5.142	0.060	30.2	4.836	5.448	10 km	–	catalog · MPC · JPL
(590975) 2013 AK_{122}	2 April 2002	NEAT	Palomar	5.239	0.136	12.1	4.529	5.949	8.3 km	–	catalog · MPC · JPL
(590977) 2013 AN_{129}	8 April 2003	Spacewatch	Kitt Peak	5.123	0.091	7.9	4.655	5.591	8.8 km	–	catalog · MPC · JPL
(590978) 2013 AW_{129}	20 October 2012	MLS	Mount Lemmon	5.118	0.065	17.0	4.784	5.451	8.7 km	–	catalog · MPC · JPL
(590979) 2013 AS_{132}	3 August 2008	Siding Spring Survey	Siding Spring	5.121	0.074	20.0	4.743	5.500	11 km	–	catalog · MPC · JPL
(590980) 2013 AT_{132}	4 January 2013	MLS	Mount Lemmon	5.153	0.108	15.3	4.596	5.709	8.9 km	–	catalog · MPC · JPL
(590981) 2013 AC_{133}	29 October 2010	MLS	Mount Lemmon	5.240	0.083	2.9	4.803	5.677	7.0 km	–	catalog · MPC · JPL
(590982) 2013 AP_{133}	12 November 2010	MLS	Mount Lemmon	5.107	0.093	11.1	4.634	5.580	8.3 km	–	catalog · MPC · JPL
(590983) 2013 AN_{134}	16 September 2009	Spacewatch	Kitt Peak	5.111	0.075	8.7	4.728	5.493	6.5 km	–	catalog · MPC · JPL
(590985) 2013 AZ_{136}	9 January 2013	Spacewatch	Kitt Peak	5.172	0.056	14.3	4.885	5.459	6.9 km	–	catalog · MPC · JPL
(590987) 2013 AO_{142}	4 January 2013	DECam	Cerro Tololo-DECam	5.197	0.083	27.1	4.764	5.630	7.7 km	–	catalog · MPC · JPL
(590991) 2013 AQ_{161}	20 January 2013	MLS	Mount Lemmon	5.242	0.062	20.7	4.919	5.566	9.2 km	–	catalog · MPC · JPL
(590997) 2013 AF_{176}	16 August 2009	Spacewatch	Kitt Peak	5.073	0.085	15.6	4.644	5.503	5.9 km	–	catalog · MPC · JPL
(591004) 2013 AZ_{197}	13 January 2013	MLS	Mount Lemmon	5.172	0.084	17.6	4.739	5.605	8.0 km	–	catalog · MPC · JPL
(591006) 2013 AF_{199}	5 January 2013	MLS	Mount Lemmon	5.207	0.046	6.0	4.969	5.445	6.5 km	–	catalog · MPC · JPL
(591007) 2013 AT_{201}	14 January 2013	MLS	Mount Lemmon	5.196	0.128	18.7	4.529	5.864	8.5 km	–	catalog · MPC · JPL
(591008) 2013 AV_{201}	10 January 2013	Pan-STARRS 1	Haleakala	5.167	0.056	20.7	4.880	5.455	7.3 km	–	catalog · MPC · JPL
(591010) 2013 BE	23 December 2012	Pan-STARRS 1	Haleakala	5.154	0.051	7.6	4.892	5.417	6.0 km	–	catalog · MPC · JPL
(591011) 2013 BM	24 March 2003	Spacewatch	Kitt Peak	5.199	0.066	6.3	4.859	5.540	7.5 km	–	catalog · MPC · JPL
(591012) 2013 BP	27 September 2012	Pan-STARRS 1	Haleakala	5.150	0.132	16.6	4.470	5.830	7.2 km	–	catalog · MPC · JPL
(591013) 2013 BN_{3}	11 February 2002	LINEAR	Socorro	5.118	0.028	10.3	4.972	5.264	9.5 km	–	catalog · MPC · JPL
(591015) 2013 BR_{7}	23 December 2012	Pan-STARRS 1	Haleakala	5.145	0.008	8.8	5.104	5.187	7.0 km	–	catalog · MPC · JPL
(591016) 2013 BH_{8}	27 September 2009	MLS	Mount Lemmon	5.222	0.067	5.8	4.870	5.573	6.9 km	–	catalog · MPC · JPL
(591017) 2013 BH_{11}	3 November 2010	MLS	Mount Lemmon	5.233	0.045	5.1	4.996	5.471	6.6 km	–	catalog · MPC · JPL
(591019) 2013 BH_{15}	13 October 2010	MLS	Mount Lemmon	5.233	0.075	6.2	4.841	5.625	6.0 km	–	catalog · MPC · JPL
(591020) 2013 BS_{16}	13 February 2002	SDSS Collaboration	Apache Point	5.276	0.038	8.0	5.077	5.475	8.5 km	–	catalog · MPC · JPL
(591023) 2013 BH_{21}	6 January 2013	Spacewatch	Kitt Peak	5.146	0.042	18.4	4.931	5.362	7.2 km	–	catalog · MPC · JPL
(591024) 2013 BV_{26}	3 November 2010	MLS	Mount Lemmon	5.210	0.079	15.6	4.798	5.623	9.0 km	–	catalog · MPC · JPL
(591028) 2013 BG_{34}	17 January 2013	Pan-STARRS 1	Haleakala	5.069	0.054	14.6	4.795	5.342	7.3 km	–	catalog · MPC · JPL
(591029) 2013 BP_{34}	27 September 2012	Pan-STARRS 1	Haleakala	5.128	0.062	6.1	4.812	5.444	7.4 km	–	catalog · MPC · JPL
(591030) 2013 BU_{36}	2 November 2010	MLS	Mount Lemmon	5.139	0.056	2.6	4.851	5.426	6.1 km	–	catalog · MPC · JPL
(591032) 2013 BS_{38}	23 December 2012	Pan-STARRS 1	Haleakala	5.143	0.075	8.7	4.755	5.531	7.7 km	–	catalog · MPC · JPL
(591033) 2013 BR_{42}	5 January 2013	Spacewatch	Kitt Peak	5.319	0.029	21.7	5.163	5.475	9.9 km	–	catalog · MPC · JPL
(591034) 2013 BT_{43}	6 January 2013	Spacewatch	Kitt Peak	5.188	0.058	8.8	4.886	5.490	7.9 km	–	catalog · MPC · JPL
(591041) 2013 BD_{60}	7 August 2008	Spacewatch	Kitt Peak	5.109	0.097	20.6	4.612	5.605	8.6 km	–	catalog · MPC · JPL
(591043) 2013 BM_{67}	22 December 2012	Pan-STARRS 1	Haleakala	5.171	0.057	15.6	4.878	5.465	6.7 km	–	catalog · MPC · JPL
(591048) 2013 BU_{82}	3 November 2010	MLS	Mount Lemmon	5.198	0.047	5.1	4.952	5.444	7.2 km	–	catalog · MPC · JPL
(591050) 2013 BQ_{91}	19 January 2013	Spacewatch	Kitt Peak	5.155	0.111	13.2	4.581	5.729	7.3 km	–	catalog · MPC · JPL
(591055) 2013 BZ_{95}	19 January 2013	Spacewatch	Kitt Peak	5.322	0.049	13.0	5.062	5.583	7.0 km	–	catalog · MPC · JPL
(591056) 2013 BM_{98}	22 January 2013	Spacewatch	Kitt Peak	5.132	0.121	15.1	4.509	5.755	6.0 km	–	catalog · MPC · JPL
(591063) 2013 CO_{20}	24 November 2011	Pan-STARRS 1	Haleakala	5.145	0.086	21.2	4.704	5.586	8.2 km	–	catalog · MPC · JPL
(591064) 2013 CY_{23}	8 December 2012	MLS	Mount Lemmon	5.151	0.087	16.3	4.706	5.597	7.5 km	–	catalog · MPC · JPL
(591066) 2013 CF_{26}	27 October 2008	MLS	Mount Lemmon	5.263	0.068	5.1	4.906	5.620	7.2 km	–	catalog · MPC · JPL
(591067) 2013 CE_{28}	18 January 2013	MLS	Mount Lemmon	5.201	0.040	16.5	4.993	5.408	9.2 km	–	catalog · MPC · JPL
(591071) 2013 CP_{40}	2 February 2013	MLS	Mount Lemmon	5.209	0.076	16.0	4.812	5.605	7.3 km	–	catalog · MPC · JPL
(591072) 2013 CY_{42}	27 November 2011	MLS	Mount Lemmon	5.260	0.098	9.3	4.744	5.777	8.3 km	–	catalog · MPC · JPL
(591077) 2013 CB_{59}	8 February 2002	Spacewatch	Kitt Peak	5.188	0.092	7.8	4.713	5.663	6.8 km	–	catalog · MPC · JPL
(591082) 2013 CK_{96}	10 August 2007	Spacewatch	Kitt Peak	5.173	0.093	13.6	4.691	5.655	7.9 km	–	catalog · MPC · JPL
(591085) 2013 CX_{100}	6 September 2008	MLS	Mount Lemmon	5.165	0.145	3.5	4.413	5.916	7.1 km	–	catalog · MPC · JPL
(591087) 2013 CH_{111}	25 September 2008	MLS	Mount Lemmon	5.148	0.105	17.9	4.606	5.691	9.6 km	–	catalog · MPC · JPL
(591101) 2013 CK_{135}	29 September 2009	MLS	Mount Lemmon	5.099	0.039	8.1	4.901	5.297	6.8 km	–	catalog · MPC · JPL
(591102) 2013 CL_{135}	2 September 2008	Spacewatch	Kitt Peak	5.292	0.074	15.1	4.901	5.682	7.6 km	–	catalog · MPC · JPL
(591123) 2013 CZ_{177}	8 February 2013	Pan-STARRS 1	Haleakala	5.261	0.103	25.1	4.719	5.803	8.7 km	–	catalog · MPC · JPL
(591131) 2013 CJ_{194}	9 February 2013	Pan-STARRS 1	Haleakala	5.269	0.026	22.0	5.133	5.404	7.5 km	–	catalog · MPC · JPL
(591135) 2013 CG_{204}	16 September 2009	Spacewatch	Kitt Peak	5.195	0.110	5.8	4.626	5.763	6.9 km	–	catalog · MPC · JPL
(591136) 2013 CH_{204}	8 November 2010	MLS	Mount Lemmon	5.148	0.082	8.3	4.725	5.570	7.1 km	–	catalog · MPC · JPL
(591137) 2013 CJ_{207}	17 November 2009	MLS	Mount Lemmon	5.180	0.052	5.3	4.911	5.450	6.7 km	–	catalog · MPC · JPL
(591138) 2013 CK_{207}	25 November 2011	Pan-STARRS 1	Haleakala	5.206	0.085	3.5	4.763	5.648	7.6 km	–	catalog · MPC · JPL
(591141) 2013 CP_{211}	14 September 2007	MLS	Mount Lemmon	5.126	0.074	17.1	4.747	5.504	8.7 km	–	catalog · MPC · JPL
(591142) 2013 CR_{212}	21 September 2009	Spacewatch	Kitt Peak	5.249	0.113	6.3	4.658	5.841	6.5 km	–	catalog · MPC · JPL
(591149) 2013 CH_{223}	17 September 2009	Spacewatch	Kitt Peak	5.144	0.077	13.0	4.747	5.541	6.1 km	–	catalog · MPC · JPL
(591150) 2013 CQ_{223}	14 December 2010	MLS	Mount Lemmon	5.202	0.054	8.4	4.921	5.483	6.1 km	–	catalog · MPC · JPL
(591151) 2013 CR_{223}	15 September 2009	Spacewatch	Kitt Peak	5.138	0.086	6.1	4.694	5.581	6.4 km	–	catalog · MPC · JPL
(591160) 2013 CX_{238}	26 January 2012	Pan-STARRS 1	Haleakala	5.251	0.031	4.6	5.087	5.414	6.0 km	–	catalog · MPC · JPL
(591163) 2013 CS_{240}	13 February 2013	Pan-STARRS 1	Haleakala	5.200	0.020	10.0	5.095	5.304	7.2 km	–	catalog · MPC · JPL
(591184) 2013 EG_{17}	6 November 2010	MLS	Mount Lemmon	5.166	0.140	8.0	4.442	5.890	6.3 km	–	catalog · MPC · JPL
(591188) 2013 EJ_{23}	24 August 2008	Spacewatch	Kitt Peak	5.257	0.097	11.6	4.750	5.765	7.4 km	–	catalog · MPC · JPL
(591192) 2013 ED_{30}	9 January 2013	Spacewatch	Kitt Peak	5.254	0.103	12.8	4.714	5.794	7.3 km	–	catalog · MPC · JPL
(591229) 2013 EZ_{136}	9 October 2010	MLS	Mount Lemmon	5.228	0.070	5.3	4.863	5.594	6.7 km	–	catalog · MPC · JPL
(591230) 2013 EV_{139}	11 October 2010	MLS	Mount Lemmon	5.248	0.101	6.0	4.716	5.780	6.6 km	–	catalog · MPC · JPL
(591683) 2014 BC_{78}	18 February 2013	MLS	Mount Lemmon	5.236	0.037	8.3	5.042	5.430	6.7 km	–	catalog · MPC · JPL
(591692) 2014 CS_{23}	21 March 2015	Pan-STARRS 1	Haleakala	5.184	0.089	14.7	4.720	5.648	8.5 km	–	catalog · MPC · JPL
(591693) 2014 CF_{28}	4 January 2013	DECam	Cerro Tololo-DECam	5.157	0.058	17.5	4.860	5.455	7.6 km	–	catalog · MPC · JPL
(591713) 2014 DM_{49}	15 September 2009	Spacewatch	Kitt Peak	5.284	0.085	7.5	4.836	5.732	7.4 km	–	catalog · MPC · JPL
(591714) 2014 DM_{53}	23 September 2008	MLS	Mount Lemmon	5.257	0.041	20.2	5.042	5.471	7.3 km	–	catalog · MPC · JPL
(591723) 2014 DN_{64}	26 February 2014	Pan-STARRS 1	Haleakala	5.142	0.110	26.1	4.574	5.710	6.5 km	–	catalog · MPC · JPL
(591730) 2014 DU_{102}	11 October 2010	MLS	Mount Lemmon	5.110	0.046	5.7	4.873	5.347	6.4 km	–	catalog · MPC · JPL
(591733) 2014 DY_{121}	23 January 2014	MLS	Mount Lemmon	5.182	0.103	8.0	4.646	5.717	7.3 km	–	catalog · MPC · JPL
(591736) 2014 DJ_{124}	12 October 2010	MLS	Mount Lemmon	5.202	0.150	6.8	4.421	5.982	7.4 km	–	catalog · MPC · JPL
(591738) 2014 DE_{130}	28 February 2014	Pan-STARRS 1	Haleakala	5.187	0.071	4.5	4.818	5.556	6.1 km	–	catalog · MPC · JPL
(591741) 2014 DK_{140}	5 March 2002	Spacewatch	Kitt Peak	5.180	0.059	11.3	4.877	5.483	9.5 km	–	catalog · MPC · JPL
(591754) 2014 DM_{174}	24 February 2014	Pan-STARRS 1	Haleakala	5.224	0.069	11.9	4.864	5.583	6.6 km	–	catalog · MPC · JPL
(591756) 2014 DU_{178}	24 February 2014	Pan-STARRS 1	Haleakala	5.096	0.013	39.0	5.031	5.162	8.1 km	–	catalog · MPC · JPL
(591757) 2014 DY_{178}	28 February 2014	Pan-STARRS 1	Haleakala	5.230	0.080	32.0	4.809	5.651	7.7 km	–	catalog · MPC · JPL
(591760) 2014 EX_{3}	20 May 2004	Spacewatch	Kitt Peak	5.270	0.074	16.6	4.880	5.660	8.7 km	–	catalog · MPC · JPL
(591761) 2014 EZ_{8}	19 January 2013	Spacewatch	Kitt Peak	5.263	0.053	14.6	4.986	5.540	8.4 km	–	catalog · MPC · JPL
(591762) 2014 EG_{12}	12 November 2010	MLS	Mount Lemmon	5.230	0.084	17.3	4.793	5.666	8.4 km	–	catalog · MPC · JPL
(591765) 2014 EF_{19}	20 February 2002	Spacewatch	Kitt Peak	5.258	0.098	29.1	4.745	5.771	7.8 km	–	catalog · MPC · JPL
(591768) 2014 EB_{26}	28 February 2014	Pan-STARRS 1	Haleakala	5.223	0.071	30.7	4.854	5.592	7.4 km	–	catalog · MPC · JPL
(591770) 2014 EK_{27}	10 January 2013	Pan-STARRS 1	Haleakala	5.205	0.079	6.4	4.792	5.618	6.7 km	–	catalog · MPC · JPL
(591771) 2014 EA_{29}	6 March 2014	MLS	Mount Lemmon	5.218	0.068	17.4	4.865	5.571	8.0 km	–	catalog · MPC · JPL
(591779) 2014 EM_{54}	20 March 2015	Pan-STARRS 1	Haleakala	5.201	0.065	12.3	4.862	5.539	6.2 km	–	catalog · MPC · JPL
(591780) 2014 EV_{54}	6 September 2008	Spacewatch	Kitt Peak	5.151	0.068	27.2	4.800	5.503	9.4 km	–	catalog · MPC · JPL
(591781) 2014 EQ_{57}	28 February 2014	Pan-STARRS 1	Haleakala	5.245	0.042	8.4	5.022	5.467	6.6 km	–	catalog · MPC · JPL
(591782) 2014 EJ_{58}	14 October 2010	MLS	Mount Lemmon	5.182	0.066	8.1	4.842	5.522	7.0 km	–	catalog · MPC · JPL
(591783) 2014 EJ_{60}	5 September 2008	Spacewatch	Kitt Peak	5.229	0.031	7.5	5.067	5.391	7.2 km	–	catalog · MPC · JPL
(591788) 2014 EZ_{84}	15 October 2009	MLS	Mount Lemmon	5.130	0.085	6.2	4.693	5.567	6.6 km	–	catalog · MPC · JPL
(591789) 2014 EM_{90}	5 September 2008	Spacewatch	Kitt Peak	5.232	0.076	8.8	4.835	5.629	8.2 km	–	catalog · MPC · JPL
(591792) 2014 EL_{97}	5 September 2008	Spacewatch	Kitt Peak	5.232	0.058	7.5	4.931	5.533	8.6 km	–	catalog · MPC · JPL
(591799) 2014 EV_{131}	3 November 2010	MLS	Mount Lemmon	5.190	0.085	8.5	4.748	5.632	6.4 km	–	catalog · MPC · JPL
(591805) 2014 EX_{160}	12 December 2012	MLS	Mount Lemmon	5.129	0.021	6.6	5.023	5.236	6.8 km	–	catalog · MPC · JPL
(591812) 2014 EM_{210}	29 July 2008	Spacewatch	Kitt Peak	5.218	0.096	9.6	4.715	5.720	7.0 km	–	catalog · MPC · JPL
(591817) 2014 ER_{215}	11 October 2010	MLS	Mount Lemmon	5.180	0.045	7.2	4.946	5.413	7.4 km	–	catalog · MPC · JPL
(591826) 2014 FV_{1}	22 October 2011	MLS	Mount Lemmon	5.263	0.083	14.7	4.825	5.702	10 km	–	catalog · MPC · JPL
(591827) 2014 FM_{5}	6 November 2010	MLS	Mount Lemmon	5.240	0.086	17.6	4.789	5.692	9.0 km	–	catalog · MPC · JPL
(591828) 2014 FO_{5}	8 June 2005	Spacewatch	Kitt Peak	5.131	0.115	12.4	4.541	5.722	12 km	–	catalog · MPC · JPL
(591831) 2014 FU_{13}	16 September 2009	Spacewatch	Kitt Peak	5.157	0.040	37.6	4.952	5.362	7.6 km	–	catalog · MPC · JPL
(591838) 2014 FK_{30}	27 December 2011	MLS	Mount Lemmon	5.219	0.127	16.5	4.555	5.882	8.3 km	–	catalog · MPC · JPL
(591839) 2014 FZ_{39}	11 March 2014	MLS	Mount Lemmon	5.138	0.042	10.8	4.922	5.355	6.7 km	–	catalog · MPC · JPL
(591850) 2014 GT	6 September 2008	Spacewatch	Kitt Peak	5.198	0.063	30.0	4.871	5.525	9.0 km	–	catalog · MPC · JPL
(591853) 2014 GR_{8}	30 July 2008	Spacewatch	Kitt Peak	5.198	0.046	30.8	4.959	5.437	10 km	–	catalog · MPC · JPL
(591855) 2014 GM_{9}	24 September 2008	Spacewatch	Kitt Peak	5.308	0.075	6.9	4.910	5.706	9.1 km	–	catalog · MPC · JPL
(591878) 2014 GN_{54}	6 September 2008	Spacewatch	Kitt Peak	5.262	0.072	7.0	4.882	5.642	6.0 km	–	catalog · MPC · JPL
(591986) 2014 KR_{39}	26 September 2008	MLS	Mount Lemmon	5.172	0.052	39.1	4.904	5.440	11 km	–	catalog · MPC · JPL
(592699) 2015 BK_{521}	28 September 2009	Spacewatch	Kitt Peak	5.190	0.061	31.8	4.873	5.508	7.8 km	–	catalog · MPC · JPL
(592717) 2015 BF_{584}	20 January 2015	Pan-STARRS 1	Haleakala	5.197	0.081	21.9	4.775	5.620	7.0 km	–	catalog · MPC · JPL
(592751) 2015 CO_{51}	8 February 2002	Spacewatch	Kitt Peak	5.222	0.047	11.0	4.979	5.465	11 km	–	catalog · MPC · JPL
(592808) 2015 DV_{129}	12 October 2010	MLS	Mount Lemmon	5.140	0.016	18.2	5.057	5.223	6.8 km	–	catalog · MPC · JPL
(592813) 2015 DM_{134}	22 December 2012	Pan-STARRS 1	Haleakala	5.147	0.097	19.5	4.646	5.649	8.7 km	–	catalog · MPC · JPL
(592843) 2015 DL_{214}	27 September 2009	MLS	Mount Lemmon	5.193	0.025	25.0	5.063	5.323	8.9 km	–	catalog · MPC · JPL
(592865) 2015 DT_{262}	27 February 2015	Pan-STARRS 1	Haleakala	5.283	0.052	37.9	5.010	5.557	7.5 km	–	catalog · MPC · JPL
(592875) 2015 DV_{277}	17 February 2015	Pan-STARRS 1	Haleakala	5.111	0.096	17.2	4.620	5.602	7.4 km	–	catalog · MPC · JPL
(592921) 2015 FV_{16}	16 January 2013	Pan-STARRS 1	Haleakala	5.192	0.038	19.5	4.995	5.388	7.2 km	–	catalog · MPC · JPL
(592922) 2015 FJ_{17}	24 February 2014	Pan-STARRS 1	Haleakala	5.254	0.073	15.3	4.868	5.640	8.0 km	–	catalog · MPC · JPL
(592927) 2015 FX_{18}	21 February 2014	Spacewatch	Kitt Peak	5.219	0.032	16.4	5.050	5.388	7.5 km	–	catalog · MPC · JPL
(592931) 2015 FH_{23}	13 November 2010	MLS	Mount Lemmon	5.233	0.030	16.2	5.077	5.389	7.1 km	–	catalog · MPC · JPL
(592946) 2015 FM_{69}	3 December 2010	MLS	Mount Lemmon	5.172	0.022	24.9	5.061	5.284	10 km	–	catalog · MPC · JPL
(592948) 2015 FT_{71}	15 October 2009	MLS	Mount Lemmon	5.292	0.139	16.7	4.559	6.026	8.2 km	–	catalog · MPC · JPL
(592977) 2015 FU_{145}	27 March 2003	Spacewatch	Kitt Peak	5.193	0.069	21.8	4.833	5.553	8.6 km	–	catalog · MPC · JPL
(592979) 2015 FZ_{150}	25 September 2008	MLS	Mount Lemmon	5.166	0.038	18.5	4.969	5.364	9.2 km	–	catalog · MPC · JPL
(592986) 2015 FK_{160}	10 January 2013	Spacewatch	Kitt Peak	5.185	0.133	7.7	4.497	5.873	6.3 km	–	catalog · MPC · JPL
(592989) 2015 FV_{165}	17 October 2010	MLS	Mount Lemmon	5.172	0.126	12.6	4.519	5.825	8.7 km	–	catalog · MPC · JPL
(592995) 2015 FT_{170}	30 November 2010	MLS	Mount Lemmon	5.311	0.059	7.6	4.997	5.624	6.7 km	–	catalog · MPC · JPL
(592997) 2015 FC_{172}	14 November 2010	Spacewatch	Kitt Peak	5.205	0.126	15.0	4.550	5.860	8.2 km	–	catalog · MPC · JPL
(593020) 2015 FY_{212}	17 October 2010	MLS	Mount Lemmon	5.075	0.087	13.2	4.632	5.518	7.1 km	–	catalog · MPC · JPL
(593034) 2015 FG_{258}	13 November 2010	R. Ferrando; M. Ferrando	Pla D'Arguines	5.229	0.081	9.3	4.803	5.655	6.8 km	–	catalog · MPC · JPL
(593057) 2015 FK_{307}	17 January 2013	Spacewatch	Kitt Peak	5.325	0.031	15.3	5.157	5.492	10 km	–	catalog · MPC · JPL
(593080) 2015 FD_{357}	14 November 1998	Spacewatch	Kitt Peak	5.089	0.079	2.9	4.689	5.489	8.5 km	–	catalog · MPC · JPL
(593087) 2015 FQ_{370}	17 January 2013	Pan-STARRS 1	Haleakala	5.155	0.048	19.1	4.906	5.404	7.0 km	–	catalog · MPC · JPL
(593088) 2015 FK_{371}	30 July 2008	MLS	Mount Lemmon	5.134	0.049	23.4	4.881	5.387	8.3 km	–	catalog · MPC · JPL
(593094) 2015 FS_{386}	22 January 2015	Pan-STARRS 1	Haleakala	5.209	0.035	16.4	5.029	5.389	7.6 km	–	catalog · MPC · JPL
(593097) 2015 FO_{393}	26 February 2014	MLS	Mount Lemmon	5.185	0.110	15.3	4.616	5.753	7.4 km	–	catalog · MPC · JPL
(593106) 2015 FV_{425}	24 February 2014	Pan-STARRS 1	Haleakala	5.244	0.024	13.3	5.119	5.370	6.5 km	–	catalog · MPC · JPL
(593109) 2015 FH_{427}	25 March 2015	Pan-STARRS 1	Haleakala	5.251	0.062	10.2	4.927	5.575	6.5 km	–	catalog · MPC · JPL
(593113) 2015 FE_{440}	22 March 2015	Pan-STARRS 1	Haleakala	5.312	0.057	21.8	5.009	5.615	8.8 km	–	catalog · MPC · JPL
(593114) 2015 FS_{441}	22 March 2015	MLS	Mount Lemmon	5.126	0.014	8.6	5.055	5.196	5.5 km	–	catalog · MPC · JPL
(593116) 2015 FR_{446}	10 January 2013	Spacewatch	Kitt Peak	5.225	0.084	9.3	4.787	5.662	6.6 km	–	catalog · MPC · JPL
(593129) 2015 GG_{16}	29 September 2009	Spacewatch	Kitt Peak	5.245	0.029	22.1	5.091	5.399	6.9 km	–	catalog · MPC · JPL
(593132) 2015 GQ_{22}	31 March 2003	SDSS Collaboration	Apache Point	5.152	0.046	22.1	4.915	5.388	8.4 km	–	catalog · MPC · JPL
(593140) 2015 GR_{38}	10 February 2014	Pan-STARRS 1	Haleakala	5.143	0.032	21.2	4.977	5.309	6.8 km	–	catalog · MPC · JPL
(593176) 2015 HW_{42}	28 January 2012	Pan-STARRS 1	Haleakala	5.278	0.058	19.8	4.974	5.581	10 km	–	catalog · MPC · JPL
(593229) 2015 HR_{171}	28 April 2015	MLS	Mount Lemmon	5.194	0.074	37.1	4.811	5.577	9.8 km	–	catalog · MPC · JPL
(593243) 2015 HG_{205}	23 April 2015	Pan-STARRS 1	Haleakala	5.195	0.100	7.3	4.674	5.716	7.2 km	–	catalog · MPC · JPL
(593245) 2015 HL_{209}	25 April 2015	Pan-STARRS 1	Haleakala	5.221	0.027	2.9	5.082	5.360	5.7 km	–	catalog · MPC · JPL
(593293) 2015 KQ_{160}	25 September 2009	Spacewatch	Kitt Peak	5.173	0.002	5.9	5.161	5.184	7.0 km	–	catalog · MPC · JPL
(593301) 2015 LM_{2}	12 April 2015	Pan-STARRS 1	Haleakala	5.245	0.084	16.2	4.802	5.688	9.2 km	–	catalog · MPC · JPL
(594074) 2016 FU_{69}	17 October 2010	MLS	Mount Lemmon	5.260	0.033	20.8	5.089	5.432	8.7 km	–	catalog · MPC · JPL
(594096) 2016 GP_{150}	16 February 2015	Pan-STARRS 1	Haleakala	5.182	0.015	7.7	5.105	5.259	6.6 km	–	catalog · MPC · JPL
(594109) 2016 GA_{188}	2 November 2010	MLS	Mount Lemmon	5.147	0.025	8.8	5.020	5.273	7.2 km	–	catalog · MPC · JPL
(594126) 2016 GN_{236}	31 March 2003	SDSS Collaboration	Apache Point	5.187	0.086	22.3	4.742	5.631	8.5 km	–	catalog · MPC · JPL
(594150) 2016 HM_{28}	25 March 2015	Pan-STARRS 1	Haleakala	5.181	0.076	10.2	4.786	5.576	7.5 km	–	catalog · MPC · JPL
(594182) 2016 LO_{5}	12 January 2013	W. Bickel	Bergisch Gladbach	5.216	0.064	16.8	4.881	5.552	7.8 km	–	catalog · MPC · JPL
(594185) 2016 LJ_{13}	16 February 2005	A. Boattini	La Silla	5.148	0.035	14.9	4.968	5.328	10 km	–	catalog · MPC · JPL
(594563) 2017 LS	28 September 2009	MLS	Mount Lemmon	5.296	0.034	21.2	5.117	5.475	11 km	–	catalog · MPC · JPL
(594825) 2018 MU_{15}	17 June 2018	Pan-STARRS 1	Haleakala	5.203	0.108	8.1	4.642	5.764	5.5 km	–	catalog · MPC · JPL
(594827) 2018 NO_{28}	10 July 2018	Pan-STARRS 1	Haleakala	5.275	0.058	8.5	4.968	5.583	6.3 km	–	catalog · MPC · JPL
(594902) 2019 KW_{4}	9 October 2010	MLS	Mount Lemmon	5.146	0.050	25.3	4.888	5.405	9.3 km	–	catalog · MPC · JPL
(594903) 2019 KZ_{4}	30 October 2010	MLS	Mount Lemmon	5.230	0.012	30.3	5.169	5.292	9.5 km	–	catalog · MPC · JPL
(594905) 2019 LA_{4}	1 June 2019	Pan-STARRS 1	Haleakala	5.126	0.045	21.9	4.896	5.356	10 km	–	catalog · MPC · JPL
(594906) 2019 LV_{6}	9 April 2014	Pan-STARRS 1	Haleakala	5.217	0.152	17.1	4.425	6.009	8.1 km	–	catalog · MPC · JPL
(594907) 2019 NR_{38}	29 June 2019	Pan-STARRS 1	Haleakala	5.260	0.077	13.5	4.856	5.664	7.2 km	–	catalog · MPC · JPL
(594908) 2019 NY_{47}	2 December 2010	MLS	Mount Lemmon	5.204	0.132	15.1	4.517	5.890	7.8 km	–	catalog · MPC · JPL
(594909) 2019 ON_{23}	28 July 2019	Pan-STARRS 2	Haleakala	5.144	0.077	12.5	4.748	5.540	7.3 km	–	catalog · MPC · JPL
(594910) 2019 PQ_{30}	21 March 2015	Pan-STARRS 1	Haleakala	5.189	0.069	9.3	4.833	5.545	6.7 km	–	catalog · MPC · JPL
(594911) 2019 PT_{33}	4 August 2019	Pan-STARRS 1	Haleakala	5.236	0.090	10.4	4.767	5.705	6.0 km	–	catalog · MPC · JPL
(594912) 2019 UE_{9}	17 November 2011	MLS	Mount Lemmon	5.220	0.072	30.5	4.845	5.594	11 km	–	catalog · MPC · JPL
(594932) 2020 PQ_{51}	10 November 2010	MLS	Mount Lemmon	5.173	0.043	1.8	4.949	5.397	6.1 km	–	catalog · MPC · JPL
(594933) 2020 RY_{86}	17 January 2013	Pan-STARRS 1	Haleakala	5.147	0.020	8.4	5.047	5.248	6.2 km	–	catalog · MPC · JPL
(594945) 2000 AQ_{220}	5 January 2000	Spacewatch	Kitt Peak	5.212	0.050	7.7	4.952	5.472	6.9 km	–	catalog · MPC · JPL
(595054) 2001 CR_{50}	2 February 2001	Spacewatch	Kitt Peak	5.124	0.050	13.5	4.867	5.381	8.1 km	–	catalog · MPC · JPL
(595062) 2001 DT_{112}	15 March 2004	Spacewatch	Kitt Peak	5.126	0.071	13.8	4.764	5.489	8.1 km	–	catalog · MPC · JPL
(595069) 2001 DL_{119}	29 October 2008	MLS	Mount Lemmon	5.285	0.038	9.7	5.086	5.484	8.1 km	–	catalog · MPC · JPL
(595089) 2001 FN_{247}	22 October 2009	MLS	Mount Lemmon	5.246	0.100	13.8	4.720	5.771	8.6 km	–	catalog · MPC · JPL
(595233) 2002 CA_{322}	2 December 2010	MLS	Mount Lemmon	5.095	0.027	5.6	4.956	5.234	5.8 km	–	catalog · MPC · JPL
(595238) 2002 CB_{326}	3 September 2008	Spacewatch	Kitt Peak	5.155	0.016	7.8	5.070	5.240	6.8 km	–	catalog · MPC · JPL
(595241) 2002 CU_{327}	17 January 2013	Pan-STARRS 1	Haleakala	5.152	0.045	9.2	4.919	5.384	6.5 km	–	catalog · MPC · JPL
(595254) 2002 ER_{157}	14 February 2002	Spacewatch	Kitt Peak	5.191	0.042	12.1	4.973	5.410	8.2 km	–	catalog · MPC · JPL
(595257) 2002 EV_{165}	3 November 2010	Spacewatch	Kitt Peak	5.215	0.048	10.1	4.963	5.468	7.8 km	–	catalog · MPC · JPL
(595268) 2002 ES_{170}	19 January 2013	Spacewatch	Kitt Peak	5.124	0.056	12.2	4.835	5.412	6.4 km	–	catalog · MPC · JPL
(595269) 2002 ED_{171}	8 November 2010	MLS	Mount Lemmon	5.298	0.011	5.4	5.241	5.355	6.6 km	–	catalog · MPC · JPL
(595270) 2002 EO_{171}	18 July 2007	MLS	Mount Lemmon	5.156	0.065	3.2	4.822	5.491	7.7 km	–	catalog · MPC · JPL
(595271) 2002 EQ_{171}	6 February 2013	MLS	Mount Lemmon	5.161	0.077	17.3	4.761	5.561	6.9 km	–	catalog · MPC · JPL
(595279) 2002 FR_{43}	19 September 2008	Spacewatch	Kitt Peak	5.209	0.084	9.1	4.773	5.645	6.6 km	–	catalog · MPC · JPL
(595522) 2003 FY_{139}	28 September 2009	Spacewatch	Kitt Peak	5.188	0.048	8.8	4.937	5.438	5.9 km	–	catalog · MPC · JPL
(595529) 2003 GT_{57}	20 April 2004	Spacewatch	Kitt Peak	5.152	0.048	7.9	4.902	5.401	9.2 km	–	catalog · MPC · JPL
(595533) 2003 GH_{59}	7 April 2003	Spacewatch	Kitt Peak	5.191	0.037	7.6	5.001	5.382	6.7 km	–	catalog · MPC · JPL
(595538) 2003 GO_{64}	8 November 2010	MLS	Mount Lemmon	5.139	0.015	8.5	5.060	5.218	7.0 km	–	catalog · MPC · JPL
(595563) 2003 JF_{21}	6 May 2003	Spacewatch	Kitt Peak	5.193	0.118	12.5	4.581	5.806	6.8 km	–	catalog · MPC · JPL
(595878) 2004 GK_{85}	14 April 2004	Spacewatch	Kitt Peak	5.112	0.023	8.4	4.996	5.228	9.3 km	–	catalog · MPC · JPL
(595894) 2004 JB_{58}	28 February 2014	Pan-STARRS 1	Haleakala	5.118	0.137	7.1	4.420	5.817	7.2 km	–	catalog · MPC · JPL
(595901) 2004 MG_{5}	23 June 2004	J. Pittichová; J. Bedient	Mauna Kea	5.207	0.110	21.1	4.636	5.777	7.6 km	–	catalog · MPC · JPL
(596258) 2005 JE_{192}	12 September 2009	Spacewatch	Kitt Peak	5.110	0.074	5.1	4.734	5.486	6.8 km	–	catalog · MPC · JPL
(596966) 2006 MO_{16}	27 October 2009	MLS	Mount Lemmon	5.246	0.070	14.5	4.881	5.610	9.2 km	–	catalog · MPC · JPL
(596976) 2006 OX_{37}	19 July 2006	Mauna Kea	Mauna Kea	5.176	0.014	19.4	5.103	5.248	7.5 km	–	catalog · MPC · JPL
(596979) 2006 OZ_{39}	29 January 2012	Spacewatch	Kitt Peak	5.226	0.031	22.5	5.066	5.386	7.9 km	–	catalog · MPC · JPL
(597561) 2007 RG_{5}	2 September 2007	K. Sárneczky; L. Kiss	Siding Spring	5.224	0.092	4.7	4.744	5.703	6.0 km	–	catalog · MPC · JPL
(597612) 2007 RQ_{308}	14 September 2007	Spacewatch	Kitt Peak	5.170	0.084	3.2	4.738	5.601	6.1 km	–	catalog · MPC · JPL
(597629) 2007 RR_{344}	18 June 2018	Pan-STARRS 1	Haleakala	5.117	0.051	16.7	4.854	5.380	6.4 km	–	catalog · MPC · JPL
(597630) 2007 RW_{346}	29 September 2009	MLS	Mount Lemmon	5.220	0.040	10.0	5.011	5.429	6.8 km	–	catalog · MPC · JPL
(597631) 2007 RP_{348}	10 September 2007	MLS	Mount Lemmon	5.314	0.096	6.3	4.804	5.823	6.0 km	–	catalog · MPC · JPL
(597640) 2007 RU_{366}	10 September 2007	MLS	Mount Lemmon	5.291	0.083	7.9	4.850	5.733	5.6 km	–	catalog · MPC · JPL
(597739) 2007 TD_{478}	15 February 2013	Pan-STARRS 1	Haleakala	5.195	0.065	19.8	4.860	5.530	7.6 km	–	catalog · MPC · JPL
(598348) 2008 OB_{30}	29 July 2008	Spacewatch	Kitt Peak	5.211	0.161	4.6	4.374	6.049	5.6 km	–	catalog · MPC · JPL
(598349) 2008 OX_{31}	30 July 2008	Spacewatch	Kitt Peak	5.121	0.059	8.0	4.821	5.422	6.4 km	–	catalog · MPC · JPL
(598356) 2008 PG_{24}	7 August 2008	Spacewatch	Kitt Peak	5.189	0.053	21.7	4.912	5.465	6.1 km	–	catalog · MPC · JPL
(598361) 2008 QL_{25}	29 August 2008	LUSS	Lulin	5.153	0.066	8.9	4.813	5.494	5.9 km	–	catalog · MPC · JPL
(598368) 2008 QB_{50}	5 September 1996	Spacewatch	Kitt Peak	5.197	0.053	30.2	4.922	5.471	9.8 km	–	catalog · MPC · JPL
(598370) 2008 QP_{51}	24 August 2008	Spacewatch	Kitt Peak	5.295	0.023	2.8	5.176	5.415	7.8 km	–	catalog · MPC · JPL
(598375) 2008 RX_{37}	2 September 2008	Spacewatch	Kitt Peak	5.157	0.068	8.5	4.805	5.509	6.2 km	–	catalog · MPC · JPL
(598379) 2008 RY_{62}	4 September 2008	Spacewatch	Kitt Peak	5.266	0.072	9.1	4.887	5.645	8.3 km	–	catalog · MPC · JPL
(598385) 2008 RC_{125}	7 September 2008	MLS	Mount Lemmon	5.215	0.124	12.2	4.571	5.860	6.8 km	–	catalog · MPC · JPL
(598386) 2008 RK_{126}	2 September 2008	Spacewatch	Kitt Peak	5.231	0.058	10.0	4.928	5.534	6.8 km	–	catalog · MPC · JPL
(598387) 2008 RU_{126}	4 September 2008	Spacewatch	Kitt Peak	5.240	0.106	27.0	4.686	5.795	6.0 km	–	catalog · MPC · JPL
(598393) 2008 RX_{155}	4 September 2008	Spacewatch	Kitt Peak	5.281	0.087	12.7	4.824	5.738	8.4 km	–	catalog · MPC · JPL
(598396) 2008 RZ_{156}	7 September 2008	MLS	Mount Lemmon	5.149	0.072	14.5	4.779	5.520	7.0 km	–	catalog · MPC · JPL
(598398) 2008 RA_{162}	18 October 2009	MLS	Mount Lemmon	5.240	0.039	3.4	5.034	5.445	6.6 km	–	catalog · MPC · JPL
(598399) 2008 RK_{163}	6 September 2008	MLS	Mount Lemmon	5.212	0.107	7.9	4.653	5.772	5.7 km	–	catalog · MPC · JPL
(598400) 2008 RD_{166}	6 September 2008	Spacewatch	Kitt Peak	5.151	0.067	15.9	4.807	5.496	7.0 km	–	catalog · MPC · JPL
(598401) 2008 RN_{166}	5 September 2008	Spacewatch	Kitt Peak	5.143	0.077	16.4	4.746	5.540	7.0 km	–	catalog · MPC · JPL
(598402) 2008 RD_{169}	4 September 2008	Spacewatch	Kitt Peak	5.180	0.087	9.3	4.732	5.629	6.8 km	–	catalog · MPC · JPL
(598404) 2008 RC_{172}	6 September 2008	MLS	Mount Lemmon	5.262	0.120	12.3	4.631	5.892	7.5 km	–	catalog · MPC · JPL
(598405) 2008 RH_{175}	6 September 2008	Spacewatch	Kitt Peak	5.208	0.100	20.5	4.687	5.730	6.7 km	–	catalog · MPC · JPL
(598406) 2008 RR_{175}	3 September 2008	Spacewatch	Kitt Peak	5.218	0.127	6.1	4.554	5.882	6.2 km	–	catalog · MPC · JPL
(598407) 2008 RZ_{175}	2 September 2008	Spacewatch	Kitt Peak	5.193	0.115	20.7	4.598	5.788	6.0 km	–	catalog · MPC · JPL
(598411) 2008 SK_{37}	20 September 2008	Spacewatch	Kitt Peak	5.315	0.083	7.7	4.877	5.754	7.1 km	–	catalog · MPC · JPL
(598418) 2008 SV_{108}	22 September 2008	MLS	Mount Lemmon	5.134	0.043	8.2	4.912	5.357	8.1 km	–	catalog · MPC · JPL
(598426) 2008 SG_{213}	2 September 2008	Spacewatch	Kitt Peak	5.240	0.158	0.7	4.411	6.070	4.8 km	–	catalog · MPC · JPL
(598427) 2008 SA_{214}	2 September 2008	Spacewatch	Kitt Peak	5.191	0.102	6.9	4.664	5.719	5.7 km	–	catalog · MPC · JPL
(598428) 2008 SJ_{214}	29 September 2008	MLS	Mount Lemmon	5.272	0.109	6.9	4.696	5.848	6.3 km	–	catalog · MPC · JPL
(598431) 2008 SD_{245}	29 September 2008	MLS	Mount Lemmon	5.224	0.039	13.7	5.019	5.430	7.0 km	–	catalog · MPC · JPL
(598433) 2008 SK_{274}	20 September 2008	MLS	Mount Lemmon	5.167	0.099	12.7	4.653	5.680	6.6 km	–	catalog · MPC · JPL
(598434) 2008 SM_{275}	4 September 2008	Spacewatch	Kitt Peak	5.286	0.051	29.9	5.017	5.556	8.9 km	–	catalog · MPC · JPL
(598435) 2008 SO_{276}	24 September 2008	Spacewatch	Kitt Peak	5.252	0.065	2.0	4.909	5.596	7.3 km	–	catalog · MPC · JPL
(598436) 2008 SY_{276}	24 September 2008	MLS	Mount Lemmon	5.183	0.043	9.0	4.959	5.406	7.4 km	–	catalog · MPC · JPL
(598437) 2008 SW_{311}	24 September 2008	MLS	Mount Lemmon	5.173	0.077	12.0	4.774	5.572	7.1 km	–	catalog · MPC · JPL
(598440) 2008 SR_{315}	12 December 2012	Spacewatch	Kitt Peak	5.117	0.050	26.8	4.860	5.375	9.7 km	–	catalog · MPC · JPL
(598447) 2008 SX_{331}	28 September 2009	Spacewatch	Kitt Peak	5.177	0.076	8.7	4.785	5.570	6.4 km	–	catalog · MPC · JPL
(598448) 2008 SP_{333}	24 September 2008	Spacewatch	Kitt Peak	5.206	0.059	17.3	4.900	5.512	6.8 km	–	catalog · MPC · JPL
(598450) 2008 SG_{335}	27 October 2009	MLS	Mount Lemmon	5.193	0.072	14.9	4.817	5.569	6.4 km	–	catalog · MPC · JPL
(598452) 2008 SO_{340}	23 September 2008	MLS	Mount Lemmon	5.255	0.086	6.6	4.802	5.709	6.3 km	–	catalog · MPC · JPL
(598456) 2008 SB_{348}	23 September 2008	Spacewatch	Kitt Peak	5.233	0.091	6.1	4.754	5.711	6.2 km	–	catalog · MPC · JPL
(598470) 2008 TH_{97}	25 September 2008	Spacewatch	Kitt Peak	5.276	0.088	6.2	4.812	5.740	7.0 km	–	catalog · MPC · JPL
(598471) 2008 TY_{97}	20 September 2008	Spacewatch	Kitt Peak	5.280	0.033	16.7	5.105	5.455	8.7 km	–	catalog · MPC · JPL
(598490) 2008 TZ_{203}	2 October 2008	MLS	Mount Lemmon	5.266	0.036	7.7	5.079	5.453	7.6 km	–	catalog · MPC · JPL
(598492) 2008 TF_{211}	2 October 2008	Spacewatch	Kitt Peak	5.271	0.084	7.5	4.827	5.715	7.7 km	–	catalog · MPC · JPL
(598493) 2008 TG_{213}	19 January 2012	Spacewatch	Kitt Peak	5.298	0.077	13.1	4.887	5.708	8.0 km	–	catalog · MPC · JPL
(598494) 2008 TX_{213}	24 August 2008	Spacewatch	Kitt Peak	5.203	0.089	6.5	4.740	5.666	6.6 km	–	catalog · MPC · JPL
(598500) 2008 TF_{218}	10 October 2008	MLS	Mount Lemmon	5.209	0.091	11.3	4.735	5.683	6.7 km	–	catalog · MPC · JPL
(598501) 2008 TV_{220}	9 October 2008	MLS	Mount Lemmon	5.282	0.060	10.3	4.966	5.597	7.6 km	–	catalog · MPC · JPL
(598503) 2008 TD_{223}	10 October 2008	MLS	Mount Lemmon	5.186	0.037	21.2	4.992	5.379	7.6 km	–	catalog · MPC · JPL
(598505) 2008 TN_{225}	1 October 2008	MLS	Mount Lemmon	5.284	0.075	24.8	4.889	5.678	8.2 km	–	catalog · MPC · JPL
(598550) 2008 UV_{373}	17 December 1999	Spacewatch	Kitt Peak	5.227	0.128	9.9	4.558	5.896	7.3 km	–	catalog · MPC · JPL
(598560) 2008 UE_{399}	14 February 2013	Pan-STARRS 1	Haleakala	5.276	0.020	9.3	5.168	5.383	7.3 km	–	catalog · MPC · JPL
(599043) 2009 RM_{18}	7 September 2008	MLS	Mount Lemmon	5.089	0.153	6.9	4.311	5.867	6.0 km	–	catalog · MPC · JPL
(599047) 2009 RC_{33}	14 September 2009	Spacewatch	Kitt Peak	5.250	0.113	11.9	4.657	5.844	7.7 km	–	catalog · MPC · JPL
(599053) 2009 RQ_{43}	15 September 2009	Spacewatch	Kitt Peak	5.151	0.135	14.8	4.457	5.844	6.7 km	–	catalog · MPC · JPL
(599054) 2009 RN_{62}	15 September 2009	Spacewatch	Kitt Peak	5.221	0.132	6.0	4.533	5.910	6.6 km	–	catalog · MPC · JPL
(599055) 2009 RN_{64}	13 February 2002	SDSS Collaboration	Apache Point	5.165	0.026	4.5	5.032	5.298	6.7 km	–	catalog · MPC · JPL
(599060) 2009 RU_{79}	15 September 2009	Spacewatch	Kitt Peak	5.063	0.072	4.3	4.697	5.429	6.7 km	–	catalog · MPC · JPL
(599061) 2009 RY_{80}	15 September 2009	Spacewatch	Kitt Peak	5.118	0.044	6.8	4.891	5.345	6.2 km	–	catalog · MPC · JPL
(599069) 2009 SR_{29}	16 September 2009	Spacewatch	Kitt Peak	5.143	0.077	3.8	4.748	5.537	6.5 km	–	catalog · MPC · JPL
(599072) 2009 SL_{48}	27 November 1998	Spacewatch	Kitt Peak	5.137	0.096	6.6	4.643	5.632	6.7 km	–	catalog · MPC · JPL
(599097) 2009 SV_{172}	18 September 2009	Spacewatch	Kitt Peak	5.216	0.117	6.2	4.608	5.823	6.4 km	–	catalog · MPC · JPL
(599105) 2009 SF_{186}	17 September 2009	Spacewatch	Kitt Peak	5.264	0.046	14.0	5.020	5.508	7.2 km	–	catalog · MPC · JPL
(599111) 2009 SM_{202}	22 September 2009	Spacewatch	Kitt Peak	5.243	0.098	6.2	4.731	5.756	7.3 km	–	catalog · MPC · JPL
(599113) 2009 ST_{207}	23 September 2009	Spacewatch	Kitt Peak	5.230	0.165	15.3	4.368	6.091	7.1 km	–	catalog · MPC · JPL
(599121) 2009 SU_{227}	26 September 2009	Spacewatch	Kitt Peak	5.200	0.193	5.4	4.199	6.202	5.4 km	–	catalog · MPC · JPL
(599125) 2009 SH_{246}	17 September 2009	Spacewatch	Kitt Peak	5.128	0.149	5.3	4.365	5.890	6.8 km	–	catalog · MPC · JPL
(599126) 2009 SR_{246}	17 September 2009	Spacewatch	Kitt Peak	5.133	0.110	5.2	4.570	5.696	5.9 km	–	catalog · MPC · JPL
(599127) 2009 SM_{254}	18 September 2009	Spacewatch	Kitt Peak	5.253	0.045	5.6	5.019	5.487	6.8 km	–	catalog · MPC · JPL
(599133) 2009 SE_{279}	25 September 2009	Spacewatch	Kitt Peak	5.184	0.091	10.7	4.712	5.656	7.6 km	–	catalog · MPC · JPL
(599143) 2009 SM_{308}	7 September 2008	MLS	Mount Lemmon	5.199	0.051	13.0	4.935	5.464	7.3 km	–	catalog · MPC · JPL
(599166) 2009 SH_{385}	29 September 2009	MLS	Mount Lemmon	5.193	0.124	7.9	4.551	5.835	7.0 km	–	catalog · MPC · JPL
(599167) 2009 SF_{389}	30 July 2008	MLS	Mount Lemmon	5.210	0.143	4.8	4.466	5.954	5.4 km	–	catalog · MPC · JPL
(599173) 2009 SW_{391}	29 September 2009	MLS	Mount Lemmon	5.173	0.158	4.4	4.354	5.992	5.3 km	–	catalog · MPC · JPL
(599176) 2009 SQ_{396}	24 September 2009	MLS	Mount Lemmon	5.099	0.106	10.7	4.561	5.637	5.9 km	–	catalog · MPC · JPL
(599178) 2009 SB_{397}	29 September 2009	MLS	Mount Lemmon	5.228	0.060	9.6	4.914	5.542	7.8 km	–	catalog · MPC · JPL
(599179) 2009 SU_{397}	28 September 2009	MLS	Mount Lemmon	5.250	0.042	12.1	5.030	5.470	6.5 km	–	catalog · MPC · JPL
(599180) 2009 SR_{400}	17 September 2009	MLS	Mount Lemmon	5.311	0.050	8.1	5.047	5.575	7.1 km	–	catalog · MPC · JPL
(599182) 2009 SR_{408}	28 September 2009	MLS	Mount Lemmon	5.128	0.053	23.6	4.858	5.398	6.4 km	–	catalog · MPC · JPL
(599184) 2009 SY_{410}	27 September 2009	Spacewatch	Kitt Peak	5.187	0.030	14.5	5.032	5.342	6.7 km	–	catalog · MPC · JPL
(599185) 2009 SK_{412}	22 September 2009	Spacewatch	Kitt Peak	5.227	0.092	6.0	4.744	5.711	6.4 km	–	catalog · MPC · JPL
(599186) 2009 SR_{412}	28 September 2009	MLS	Mount Lemmon	5.067	0.058	6.4	4.774	5.359	5.7 km	–	catalog · MPC · JPL
(599187) 2009 SW_{414}	19 September 2009	Spacewatch	Kitt Peak	5.134	0.108	6.9	4.577	5.690	5.9 km	–	catalog · MPC · JPL
(599188) 2009 SY_{415}	29 September 2009	MLS	Mount Lemmon	5.234	0.049	9.9	4.978	5.489	6.8 km	–	catalog · MPC · JPL
(599191) 2009 SH_{417}	25 September 2009	Spacewatch	Kitt Peak	5.084	0.087	5.2	4.640	5.528	5.6 km	–	catalog · MPC · JPL
(599195) 2009 TM_{19}	11 October 2009	MLS	Mount Lemmon	5.125	0.106	7.8	4.584	5.665	6.2 km	–	catalog · MPC · JPL
(599198) 2009 TL_{30}	5 September 2008	Spacewatch	Kitt Peak	5.166	0.050	14.1	4.905	5.427	7.2 km	–	catalog · MPC · JPL
(599204) 2009 TB_{53}	23 February 2015	Pan-STARRS 1	Haleakala	5.195	0.066	20.1	4.854	5.536	7.3 km	–	catalog · MPC · JPL
(599205) 2009 TG_{53}	14 October 2009	MLS	Mount Lemmon	5.143	0.064	5.9	4.815	5.470	5.5 km	–	catalog · MPC · JPL
(599211) 2009 UZ_{18}	19 October 2009	W. G. Dillon	Sierra Stars	5.225	0.132	8.4	4.538	5.913	6.1 km	–	catalog · MPC · JPL
(599216) 2009 UR_{44}	22 September 2009	MLS	Mount Lemmon	5.194	0.066	8.8	4.853	5.535	7.5 km	–	catalog · MPC · JPL
(599217) 2009 UB_{45}	22 September 2009	MLS	Mount Lemmon	5.179	0.065	18.9	4.840	5.517	7.4 km	–	catalog · MPC · JPL
(599219) 2009 UV_{49}	27 September 2009	Spacewatch	Kitt Peak	5.277	0.067	4.0	4.921	5.633	6.8 km	–	catalog · MPC · JPL
(599222) 2009 UH_{62}	17 October 2009	MLS	Mount Lemmon	5.178	0.058	7.0	4.879	5.476	6.9 km	–	catalog · MPC · JPL
(599223) 2009 UQ_{64}	28 September 2009	MLS	Mount Lemmon	5.290	0.053	10.2	5.008	5.572	6.7 km	–	catalog · MPC · JPL
(599224) 2009 UN_{65}	17 October 2009	MLS	Mount Lemmon	5.191	0.190	6.6	4.202	6.179	5.4 km	–	catalog · MPC · JPL
(599227) 2009 UD_{78}	18 September 2009	Spacewatch	Kitt Peak	5.237	0.047	10.4	4.993	5.481	8.9 km	–	catalog · MPC · JPL
(599228) 2009 UN_{95}	15 September 2009	Spacewatch	Kitt Peak	5.313	0.065	8.9	4.968	5.657	9.7 km	–	catalog · MPC · JPL
(599234) 2009 UO_{117}	14 October 2009	W. Bickel	Bergisch Gladbach	5.255	0.060	5.0	4.939	5.571	7.9 km	–	catalog · MPC · JPL
(599241) 2009 UE_{129}	26 October 2009	MLS	Mount Lemmon	5.188	0.083	16.5	4.756	5.619	9.6 km	–	catalog · MPC · JPL
(599242) 2009 UA_{149}	21 September 2009	Spacewatch	Kitt Peak	5.264	0.154	10.1	4.456	6.072	6.6 km	–	catalog · MPC · JPL
(599243) 2009 UW_{160}	19 October 2010	MLS	Mount Lemmon	5.195	0.065	10.3	4.859	5.532	7.7 km	–	catalog · MPC · JPL
(599250) 2009 UJ_{166}	18 November 2011	MLS	Mount Lemmon	5.133	0.066	17.6	4.794	5.472	8.9 km	–	catalog · MPC · JPL
(599254) 2009 UD_{168}	18 January 2013	MLS	Mount Lemmon	5.130	0.033	8.6	4.961	5.300	6.3 km	–	catalog · MPC · JPL
(599255) 2009 UW_{169}	27 October 2009	MLS	Mount Lemmon	5.189	0.039	9.6	4.989	5.388	6.6 km	–	catalog · MPC · JPL
(599256) 2009 UX_{169}	16 October 2009	MLS	Mount Lemmon	5.161	0.061	7.9	4.844	5.478	6.9 km	–	catalog · MPC · JPL
(599257) 2009 UC_{170}	11 June 2007	Mauna Kea	Mauna Kea	5.253	0.006	8.8	5.220	5.286	6.9 km	–	catalog · MPC · JPL
(599258) 2009 UE_{170}	26 October 2009	MLS	Mount Lemmon	5.256	0.081	7.9	4.830	5.682	6.5 km	–	catalog · MPC · JPL
(599259) 2009 UG_{170}	25 October 2009	Spacewatch	Kitt Peak	5.128	0.060	6.3	4.823	5.434	6.9 km	–	catalog · MPC · JPL
(599261) 2009 UY_{171}	15 June 2018	Pan-STARRS 1	Haleakala	5.269	0.082	16.3	4.837	5.702	7.2 km	–	catalog · MPC · JPL
(599263) 2009 UY_{173}	26 October 2009	Spacewatch	Kitt Peak	5.282	0.050	8.5	5.015	5.548	7.9 km	–	catalog · MPC · JPL
(599267) 2009 UW_{180}	16 October 2009	MLS	Mount Lemmon	5.144	0.068	5.9	4.796	5.492	6.1 km	–	catalog · MPC · JPL
(599268) 2009 UZ_{181}	27 October 2009	MLS	Mount Lemmon	5.265	0.050	14.9	5.003	5.527	6.5 km	–	catalog · MPC · JPL
(599269) 2009 UQ_{182}	24 October 2009	Spacewatch	Kitt Peak	5.276	0.032	16.5	5.105	5.446	8.4 km	–	catalog · MPC · JPL
(599270) 2009 UA_{184}	16 October 2009	MLS	Mount Lemmon	5.173	0.107	6.9	4.621	5.725	7.2 km	–	catalog · MPC · JPL
(599276) 2009 VS_{19}	9 November 2009	MLS	Mount Lemmon	5.244	0.071	4.6	4.872	5.617	5.7 km	–	catalog · MPC · JPL
(599277) 2009 VV_{35}	8 October 2008	MLS	Mount Lemmon	5.288	0.047	7.8	5.040	5.535	7.5 km	–	catalog · MPC · JPL
(599281) 2009 VP_{55}	29 September 2008	MLS	Mount Lemmon	5.248	0.144	10.0	4.490	6.005	6.6 km	–	catalog · MPC · JPL
(599283) 2009 VQ_{56}	5 September 2008	Spacewatch	Kitt Peak	5.235	0.172	5.0	4.334	6.135	6.2 km	–	catalog · MPC · JPL
(599286) 2009 VW_{88}	27 September 2009	Spacewatch	Kitt Peak	5.243	0.132	9.5	4.550	5.936	6.9 km	–	catalog · MPC · JPL
(599294) 2009 VL_{122}	16 February 2013	MLS	Mount Lemmon	5.132	0.025	3.0	5.001	5.262	6.2 km	–	catalog · MPC · JPL
(599296) 2009 VA_{127}	8 November 2009	MLS	Mount Lemmon	5.264	0.117	8.0	4.649	5.879	6.1 km	–	catalog · MPC · JPL
(599297) 2009 VC_{130}	8 November 2009	MLS	Mount Lemmon	5.309	0.025	16.1	5.178	5.440	7.0 km	–	catalog · MPC · JPL
(599314) 2009 WP_{108}	17 November 2009	MLS	Mount Lemmon	5.279	0.035	4.9	5.095	5.463	7.1 km	–	catalog · MPC · JPL
(599322) 2009 WF_{151}	23 May 2001	J. L. Elliot; L. H. Wasserman	Cerro Tololo	5.362	0.047	6.5	5.107	5.616	7.8 km	–	catalog · MPC · JPL
(599325) 2009 WJ_{160}	21 November 2009	MLS	Mount Lemmon	5.254	0.086	6.8	4.803	5.704	6.1 km	–	catalog · MPC · JPL
(599344) 2009 WB_{271}	5 June 2016	Pan-STARRS 1	Haleakala	5.202	0.006	30.0	5.168	5.235	8.1 km	–	catalog · MPC · JPL
(599353) 2009 WC_{279}	8 November 2010	Spacewatch	Kitt Peak	5.127	0.067	12.8	4.782	5.473	7.4 km	–	catalog · MPC · JPL
(599354) 2009 WX_{284}	4 October 1996	Spacewatch	Kitt Peak	5.229	0.053	17.6	4.950	5.507	7.5 km	–	catalog · MPC · JPL
(599391) 2010 BF_{137}	9 September 2008	MLS	Mount Lemmon	5.219	0.144	10.2	4.469	5.969	7.2 km	–	catalog · MPC · JPL
(599698) 2010 TW_{192}	12 October 2010	MLS	Mount Lemmon	5.134	0.089	8.6	4.676	5.592	6.8 km	–	catalog · MPC · JPL
(599728) 2010 UV_{79}	20 September 2009	Spacewatch	Kitt Peak	5.152	0.087	11.8	4.704	5.600	7.0 km	–	catalog · MPC · JPL
(599741) 2010 US_{122}	17 October 2010	MLS	Mount Lemmon	5.129	0.101	8.6	4.610	5.648	7.2 km	–	catalog · MPC · JPL
(599769) 2010 VB_{102}	5 November 2010	Spacewatch	Kitt Peak	5.204	0.039	18.7	5.000	5.408	8.2 km	–	catalog · MPC · JPL
(599770) 2010 VJ_{111}	17 October 2010	MLS	Mount Lemmon	5.154	0.126	10.7	4.503	5.805	7.0 km	–	catalog · MPC · JPL
(599775) 2010 VW_{141}	6 November 2010	MLS	Mount Lemmon	5.148	0.108	7.8	4.592	5.705	6.5 km	–	catalog · MPC · JPL
(599779) 2010 VW_{156}	8 November 2010	Spacewatch	Kitt Peak	5.124	0.086	17.9	4.686	5.563	8.4 km	–	catalog · MPC · JPL
(599780) 2010 VC_{164}	20 September 2009	Spacewatch	Kitt Peak	5.169	0.050	4.0	4.913	5.425	6.1 km	–	catalog · MPC · JPL
(599782) 2010 VM_{171}	17 September 2009	Spacewatch	Kitt Peak	5.165	0.219	3.3	4.034	6.296	5.4 km	–	catalog · MPC · JPL
(599787) 2010 VO_{190}	13 November 2010	MLS	Mount Lemmon	5.204	0.130	12.3	4.527	5.881	6.6 km	–	catalog · MPC · JPL
(599807) 2010 VS_{245}	3 November 2010	Spacewatch	Kitt Peak	5.203	0.025	13.9	5.071	5.335	7.2 km	–	catalog · MPC · JPL
(599808) 2010 VV_{245}	13 November 2010	MLS	Mount Lemmon	5.172	0.028	15.4	5.025	5.319	6.7 km	–	catalog · MPC · JPL
(599809) 2010 VN_{247}	12 November 2010	MLS	Mount Lemmon	5.080	0.041	12.0	4.873	5.287	6.9 km	–	catalog · MPC · JPL
(599812) 2010 VW_{249}	10 November 2010	MLS	Mount Lemmon	5.128	0.090	6.8	4.668	5.589	6.6 km	–	catalog · MPC · JPL
(599813) 2010 VC_{251}	12 November 2010	MLS	Mount Lemmon	5.133	0.079	8.6	4.725	5.540	7.3 km	–	catalog · MPC · JPL
(599821) 2010 VR_{258}	2 November 2010	MLS	Mount Lemmon	5.109	0.055	8.2	4.827	5.391	6.8 km	–	catalog · MPC · JPL
(599822) 2010 VM_{259}	8 November 2010	MLS	Mount Lemmon	5.161	0.084	10.0	4.726	5.596	7.1 km	–	catalog · MPC · JPL
(599823) 2010 VX_{262}	6 November 2010	MLS	Mount Lemmon	5.079	0.021	6.9	4.974	5.183	6.1 km	–	catalog · MPC · JPL
(599824) 2010 VY_{262}	1 November 2010	Spacewatch	Kitt Peak	5.127	0.099	19.7	4.621	5.634	7.0 km	–	catalog · MPC · JPL
(599825) 2010 VQ_{263}	1 November 2010	MLS	Mount Lemmon	5.209	0.120	11.3	4.585	5.833	7.6 km	–	catalog · MPC · JPL
(599849) 2010 XH_{31}	2 December 2010	MLS	Mount Lemmon	5.194	0.045	10.1	4.961	5.427	6.3 km	–	catalog · MPC · JPL
(599861) 2010 XM_{91}	22 March 2014	MLS	Mount Lemmon	5.244	0.076	18.2	4.848	5.640	7.4 km	–	catalog · MPC · JPL
(599865) 2010 XZ_{105}	10 February 2013	Pan-STARRS 1	Haleakala	5.136	0.066	14.3	4.796	5.476	6.6 km	–	catalog · MPC · JPL
(599879) 2011 AG_{18}	8 November 2010	MLS	Mount Lemmon	5.214	0.081	14.4	4.791	5.638	7.2 km	–	catalog · MPC · JPL
(599895) 2011 AJ_{86}	3 February 2012	Pan-STARRS 1	Haleakala	5.226	0.090	17.1	4.756	5.697	8.1 km	–	catalog · MPC · JPL

back to top
