= List of minor planets: 572001–573000 =

The following is a partial list of minor planets, running from minor-planet number 572001 through 573000, inclusive. The primary data for this and other partial lists is based on JPL's "Small-Body Orbital Elements" and data available from the Minor Planet Center. Critical list information is also provided by the MPC, unless otherwise specified from Lowell Observatory. A detailed description of the table's columns and additional sources are given on the main page including a complete list of every page in this series, and a statistical break-up on the dynamical classification of minor planets.

Also see the summary list of all named bodies in numerical and alphabetical order, and the corresponding naming citations for the number range of this particular list. New namings may only be added to this list after official publication, as the preannouncement of names is condemned by the Working Group for Small Bodies Nomenclature of the International Astronomical Union.

Near-Earth obj.	MBA (inner)	MBA (outer)	Centaur
Mars-crosser	MBA (middle)	Jupiter trojan	Trans-Neptunian obj.
Unclassified

== 572001–572100 ==
Designation			Discovery			Properties		Ref
Permanent	Provisional	Named after	Date	Site	Discoverer(s)	Category	Diam.	Ref
572001	2008 AH_{149}	—	March 7, 2014	Kitt Peak	Spacewatch	ANF	1.1 km	MPC · JPL
572002	2008 AK_{149}	—	January 11, 2008	Kitt Peak	Spacewatch	·	1.9 km	MPC · JPL
572003	2008 AS_{149}	—	February 28, 2014	Haleakala	Pan-STARRS 1	THM	1.8 km	MPC · JPL
572004	2008 AY_{149}	—	January 10, 2008	Mount Lemmon	Mount Lemmon Survey	EOS	1.6 km	MPC · JPL
572005	2008 AU_{150}	—	January 11, 2008	Mount Lemmon	Mount Lemmon Survey	·	2.7 km	MPC · JPL
572006	2008 AA_{151}	—	January 11, 2008	Kitt Peak	Spacewatch	·	2.6 km	MPC · JPL
572007	2008 AD_{151}	—	January 13, 2008	Kitt Peak	Spacewatch	EOS	2.0 km	MPC · JPL
572008	2008 AE_{151}	—	January 13, 2008	Kitt Peak	Spacewatch	·	2.0 km	MPC · JPL
572009	2008 AK_{151}	—	January 11, 2008	Kitt Peak	Spacewatch	·	940 m	MPC · JPL
572010	2008 AV_{151}	—	January 11, 2008	Mount Lemmon	Mount Lemmon Survey	·	1.5 km	MPC · JPL
572011	2008 AJ_{152}	—	January 10, 2008	Mount Lemmon	Mount Lemmon Survey	·	2.2 km	MPC · JPL
572012	2008 AX_{152}	—	January 12, 2008	Kitt Peak	Spacewatch	EOS	1.5 km	MPC · JPL
572013	2008 BO	—	January 16, 2008	Mount Lemmon	Mount Lemmon Survey	PHO	910 m	MPC · JPL
572014	2008 BU_{6}	—	July 31, 2000	Cerro Tololo	Deep Ecliptic Survey	EOS	1.6 km	MPC · JPL
572015	2008 BB_{7}	—	January 31, 1997	Kitt Peak	Spacewatch	·	2.8 km	MPC · JPL
572016	2008 BQ_{8}	—	January 16, 2008	Kitt Peak	Spacewatch	·	1.3 km	MPC · JPL
572017	2008 BR_{10}	—	January 17, 2008	Mount Lemmon	Mount Lemmon Survey	·	1.3 km	MPC · JPL
572018	2008 BL_{11}	—	July 31, 2005	Palomar	NEAT	·	3.5 km	MPC · JPL
572019	2008 BX_{12}	—	January 18, 2008	Kitt Peak	Spacewatch	T_{j} (2.99)	2.9 km	MPC · JPL
572020	2008 BD_{13}	—	September 26, 2006	Catalina	CSS	EOS	2.0 km	MPC · JPL
572021	2008 BF_{19}	—	December 17, 2007	Mount Lemmon	Mount Lemmon Survey	·	3.0 km	MPC · JPL
572022	2008 BM_{26}	—	January 30, 2008	Kitt Peak	Spacewatch	·	2.7 km	MPC · JPL
572023	2008 BF_{28}	—	January 30, 2008	Mount Lemmon	Mount Lemmon Survey	EOS	1.5 km	MPC · JPL
572024	2008 BY_{36}	—	January 31, 2008	Mount Lemmon	Mount Lemmon Survey	V	610 m	MPC · JPL
572025	2008 BL_{45}	—	December 19, 2007	Mount Lemmon	Mount Lemmon Survey	·	1.1 km	MPC · JPL
572026	2008 BA_{48}	—	January 16, 2008	Kitt Peak	Spacewatch	EOS	1.4 km	MPC · JPL
572027	2008 BN_{55}	—	January 19, 2008	Mount Lemmon	Mount Lemmon Survey	TIR	2.3 km	MPC · JPL
572028	2008 BP_{55}	—	January 30, 2008	Mount Lemmon	Mount Lemmon Survey	·	1.6 km	MPC · JPL
572029	2008 BB_{56}	—	January 18, 2008	Kitt Peak	Spacewatch	·	3.0 km	MPC · JPL
572030	2008 BW_{57}	—	September 12, 2017	Haleakala	Pan-STARRS 1	·	3.3 km	MPC · JPL
572031	2008 BG_{58}	—	April 17, 2009	Kitt Peak	Spacewatch	·	2.1 km	MPC · JPL
572032	2008 BU_{60}	—	January 30, 2008	Kitt Peak	Spacewatch	·	2.8 km	MPC · JPL
572033	2008 CS_{5}	—	February 2, 2008	Kitt Peak	Spacewatch	·	3.1 km	MPC · JPL
572034	2008 CQ_{6}	—	December 17, 2007	Mount Lemmon	Mount Lemmon Survey	·	2.4 km	MPC · JPL
572035	2008 CU_{7}	—	February 2, 2008	Mount Lemmon	Mount Lemmon Survey	·	2.2 km	MPC · JPL
572036	2008 CV_{11}	—	February 3, 2008	Kitt Peak	Spacewatch	·	830 m	MPC · JPL
572037	2008 CD_{12}	—	February 3, 2008	Kitt Peak	Spacewatch	·	1.1 km	MPC · JPL
572038	2008 CB_{14}	—	February 3, 2008	Kitt Peak	Spacewatch	·	1.2 km	MPC · JPL
572039	2008 CC_{14}	—	February 3, 2008	Kitt Peak	Spacewatch	·	3.3 km	MPC · JPL
572040	2008 CU_{21}	—	February 8, 2008	Gaisberg	Gierlinger, R.	·	1.7 km	MPC · JPL
572041	2008 CG_{27}	—	February 2, 2008	Kitt Peak	Spacewatch	·	2.3 km	MPC · JPL
572042	2008 CK_{30}	—	January 11, 2008	Kitt Peak	Spacewatch	·	2.6 km	MPC · JPL
572043	2008 CW_{32}	—	February 2, 2008	Kitt Peak	Spacewatch	·	2.2 km	MPC · JPL
572044	2008 CJ_{40}	—	January 10, 2008	Kitt Peak	Spacewatch	·	2.9 km	MPC · JPL
572045	2008 CW_{41}	—	February 2, 2008	Kitt Peak	Spacewatch	·	3.3 km	MPC · JPL
572046	2008 CR_{45}	—	February 2, 2008	Kitt Peak	Spacewatch	·	990 m	MPC · JPL
572047	2008 CN_{51}	—	December 30, 2007	Kitt Peak	Spacewatch	·	1.7 km	MPC · JPL
572048	2008 CR_{56}	—	February 7, 2008	Mount Lemmon	Mount Lemmon Survey	·	1.8 km	MPC · JPL
572049	2008 CJ_{57}	—	January 18, 2008	Kitt Peak	Spacewatch	·	1.1 km	MPC · JPL
572050	2008 CJ_{60}	—	February 7, 2008	Mount Lemmon	Mount Lemmon Survey	EOS	1.4 km	MPC · JPL
572051	2008 CP_{60}	—	November 22, 2006	Kitt Peak	Spacewatch	·	2.3 km	MPC · JPL
572052	2008 CC_{66}	—	October 19, 2007	Mount Lemmon	Mount Lemmon Survey	·	3.0 km	MPC · JPL
572053	2008 CF_{75}	—	February 10, 2008	Catalina	CSS	·	2.5 km	MPC · JPL
572054	2008 CS_{79}	—	February 7, 2008	Kitt Peak	Spacewatch	·	2.1 km	MPC · JPL
572055	2008 CF_{80}	—	February 7, 2008	Kitt Peak	Spacewatch	·	2.4 km	MPC · JPL
572056	2008 CL_{82}	—	April 1, 2003	Apache Point	SDSS Collaboration	·	2.7 km	MPC · JPL
572057	2008 CH_{85}	—	December 16, 1995	Kitt Peak	Spacewatch	·	1.2 km	MPC · JPL
572058	2008 CA_{94}	—	February 8, 2008	Mount Lemmon	Mount Lemmon Survey	·	920 m	MPC · JPL
572059	2008 CH_{94}	—	February 8, 2008	Mount Lemmon	Mount Lemmon Survey	H	510 m	MPC · JPL
572060	2008 CR_{97}	—	September 18, 2006	Kitt Peak	Spacewatch	·	590 m	MPC · JPL
572061	2008 CT_{98}	—	February 9, 2008	Kitt Peak	Spacewatch	·	1.6 km	MPC · JPL
572062	2008 CS_{102}	—	February 9, 2008	Mount Lemmon	Mount Lemmon Survey	·	1.7 km	MPC · JPL
572063	2008 CE_{105}	—	February 9, 2008	Mount Lemmon	Mount Lemmon Survey	·	1.1 km	MPC · JPL
572064	2008 CH_{105}	—	February 9, 2008	Mount Lemmon	Mount Lemmon Survey	VER	2.5 km	MPC · JPL
572065	2008 CW_{105}	—	March 27, 2003	Kitt Peak	Spacewatch	EOS	2.7 km	MPC · JPL
572066	2008 CL_{111}	—	February 10, 2008	Kitt Peak	Spacewatch	·	2.1 km	MPC · JPL
572067	2008 CS_{111}	—	February 10, 2008	Kitt Peak	Spacewatch	EOS	1.7 km	MPC · JPL
572068	2008 CL_{112}	—	February 10, 2008	Kitt Peak	Spacewatch	·	2.5 km	MPC · JPL
572069	2008 CS_{112}	—	February 10, 2008	Kitt Peak	Spacewatch	·	2.6 km	MPC · JPL
572070	2008 CC_{115}	—	January 15, 2008	Mount Lemmon	Mount Lemmon Survey	·	750 m	MPC · JPL
572071	2008 CS_{118}	—	February 10, 2008	Lulin	LUSS	T_{j} (2.98) · EUP	3.2 km	MPC · JPL
572072	2008 CS_{126}	—	October 20, 1995	Kitt Peak	Spacewatch	·	2.1 km	MPC · JPL
572073	2008 CV_{127}	—	February 8, 2008	Kitt Peak	Spacewatch	·	1.9 km	MPC · JPL
572074	2008 CD_{130}	—	February 8, 2008	Kitt Peak	Spacewatch	·	2.7 km	MPC · JPL
572075	2008 CX_{135}	—	February 8, 2008	Kitt Peak	Spacewatch	·	1.9 km	MPC · JPL
572076	2008 CC_{136}	—	September 19, 2001	Apache Point	SDSS Collaboration	·	1.7 km	MPC · JPL
572077	2008 CB_{139}	—	February 8, 2008	Kitt Peak	Spacewatch	·	2.1 km	MPC · JPL
572078	2008 CO_{147}	—	February 9, 2008	Kitt Peak	Spacewatch	·	2.2 km	MPC · JPL
572079	2008 CJ_{148}	—	February 9, 2008	Mount Lemmon	Mount Lemmon Survey	·	2.7 km	MPC · JPL
572080	2008 CK_{150}	—	February 2, 2008	Kitt Peak	Spacewatch	·	2.3 km	MPC · JPL
572081	2008 CX_{150}	—	February 9, 2008	Kitt Peak	Spacewatch	·	3.0 km	MPC · JPL
572082	2008 CZ_{150}	—	February 9, 2008	Kitt Peak	Spacewatch	·	1.0 km	MPC · JPL
572083	2008 CB_{153}	—	September 13, 2005	Kitt Peak	Spacewatch	·	2.6 km	MPC · JPL
572084	2008 CQ_{154}	—	February 9, 2008	Kitt Peak	Spacewatch	·	3.1 km	MPC · JPL
572085	2008 CY_{154}	—	February 9, 2008	Kitt Peak	Spacewatch	·	880 m	MPC · JPL
572086	2008 CY_{155}	—	February 9, 2008	Catalina	CSS	·	3.4 km	MPC · JPL
572087	2008 CR_{157}	—	December 14, 1996	Kitt Peak	Spacewatch	·	2.5 km	MPC · JPL
572088	2008 CW_{162}	—	February 10, 2008	Kitt Peak	Spacewatch	·	2.5 km	MPC · JPL
572089	2008 CF_{163}	—	February 10, 2008	Kitt Peak	Spacewatch	·	2.4 km	MPC · JPL
572090	2008 CG_{167}	—	January 16, 2008	Kitt Peak	Spacewatch	·	2.5 km	MPC · JPL
572091	2008 CX_{170}	—	January 12, 2008	Mount Lemmon	Mount Lemmon Survey	·	3.0 km	MPC · JPL
572092	2008 CK_{172}	—	February 2, 2008	Mount Lemmon	Mount Lemmon Survey	·	1.1 km	MPC · JPL
572093	2008 CX_{172}	—	February 13, 2008	Mount Lemmon	Mount Lemmon Survey	·	2.7 km	MPC · JPL
572094	2008 CN_{173}	—	February 13, 2008	Kitt Peak	Spacewatch	·	2.2 km	MPC · JPL
572095	2008 CX_{185}	—	February 2, 2008	Catalina	CSS	·	2.8 km	MPC · JPL
572096	2008 CL_{190}	—	October 2, 2006	Mount Lemmon	Mount Lemmon Survey	·	1.1 km	MPC · JPL
572097	2008 CT_{197}	—	February 10, 2008	Kitt Peak	Spacewatch	·	1.2 km	MPC · JPL
572098	2008 CK_{205}	—	February 2, 2008	Kitt Peak	Spacewatch	HYG	2.5 km	MPC · JPL
572099	2008 CO_{216}	—	February 13, 2008	Catalina	CSS	·	1.9 km	MPC · JPL
572100	2008 CU_{219}	—	May 21, 2015	Haleakala	Pan-STARRS 1	VER	2.3 km	MPC · JPL

== 572101–572200 ==
back to top

Designation			Discovery			Properties		Ref
Permanent	Provisional	Named after	Date	Site	Discoverer(s)	Category	Diam.	Ref
572101	2008 CW_{219}	—	February 9, 2008	Mount Lemmon	Mount Lemmon Survey	NYS	1.1 km	MPC · JPL
572102	2008 CX_{219}	—	February 2, 2008	Kitt Peak	Spacewatch	·	1.9 km	MPC · JPL
572103	2008 CB_{220}	—	February 8, 2008	Kitt Peak	Spacewatch	·	3.1 km	MPC · JPL
572104	2008 CJ_{220}	—	February 2, 2008	Kitt Peak	Spacewatch	·	2.6 km	MPC · JPL
572105	2008 CK_{220}	—	February 9, 2008	Mount Lemmon	Mount Lemmon Survey	·	2.6 km	MPC · JPL
572106	2008 CO_{220}	—	September 24, 2011	Haleakala	Pan-STARRS 1	·	2.7 km	MPC · JPL
572107	2008 CR_{220}	—	February 24, 2014	Haleakala	Pan-STARRS 1	VER	2.2 km	MPC · JPL
572108	2008 CY_{220}	—	March 8, 2014	Mount Lemmon	Mount Lemmon Survey	·	2.4 km	MPC · JPL
572109	2008 CZ_{220}	—	August 27, 2011	Haleakala	Pan-STARRS 1	VER	2.0 km	MPC · JPL
572110	2008 CM_{221}	—	February 26, 2014	Haleakala	Pan-STARRS 1	·	2.8 km	MPC · JPL
572111	2008 CS_{221}	—	February 7, 2008	Mount Lemmon	Mount Lemmon Survey	·	2.2 km	MPC · JPL
572112	2008 CY_{221}	—	January 22, 2013	Mount Lemmon	Mount Lemmon Survey	·	1.6 km	MPC · JPL
572113	2008 CU_{222}	—	January 10, 2013	Cala d'Hort	B. Linero, I. de la Cueva	·	2.3 km	MPC · JPL
572114	2008 CL_{223}	—	February 12, 2008	Mount Lemmon	Mount Lemmon Survey	EOS	1.4 km	MPC · JPL
572115	2008 CO_{223}	—	February 13, 2008	Kitt Peak	Spacewatch	PHO	820 m	MPC · JPL
572116	2008 CP_{223}	—	February 9, 2008	Mount Lemmon	Mount Lemmon Survey	·	810 m	MPC · JPL
572117	2008 CZ_{223}	—	December 23, 2012	Haleakala	Pan-STARRS 1	EOS	2.0 km	MPC · JPL
572118	2008 CK_{224}	—	February 14, 2008	Mount Lemmon	Mount Lemmon Survey	·	2.5 km	MPC · JPL
572119	2008 CF_{225}	—	October 6, 2013	Catalina	CSS	·	610 m	MPC · JPL
572120	2008 CY_{225}	—	January 12, 2013	Mount Lemmon	Mount Lemmon Survey	EOS	1.6 km	MPC · JPL
572121	2008 CB_{226}	—	September 23, 2011	Haleakala	Pan-STARRS 1	·	2.2 km	MPC · JPL
572122	2008 CV_{227}	—	February 7, 2008	Kitt Peak	Spacewatch	·	840 m	MPC · JPL
572123	2008 CY_{228}	—	September 23, 2011	Charleston	R. Holmes	·	2.9 km	MPC · JPL
572124	2008 CN_{229}	—	February 11, 2008	Mount Lemmon	Mount Lemmon Survey	·	2.9 km	MPC · JPL
572125	2008 CS_{229}	—	February 2, 2008	Mount Lemmon	Mount Lemmon Survey	·	3.0 km	MPC · JPL
572126	2008 CY_{229}	—	January 13, 2008	Kitt Peak	Spacewatch	EOS	1.6 km	MPC · JPL
572127	2008 CP_{230}	—	February 9, 2008	Kitt Peak	Spacewatch	·	3.0 km	MPC · JPL
572128	2008 CQ_{230}	—	January 13, 2008	Kitt Peak	Spacewatch	·	3.3 km	MPC · JPL
572129	2008 CS_{230}	—	January 13, 2008	Kitt Peak	Spacewatch	·	1.5 km	MPC · JPL
572130	2008 CK_{231}	—	August 26, 2016	Haleakala	Pan-STARRS 1	·	2.8 km	MPC · JPL
572131	2008 CY_{231}	—	March 8, 2014	Mount Lemmon	Mount Lemmon Survey	·	2.1 km	MPC · JPL
572132	2008 CF_{233}	—	February 13, 2008	Mount Lemmon	Mount Lemmon Survey	HYG	2.5 km	MPC · JPL
572133	2008 CK_{233}	—	February 13, 2008	Mount Lemmon	Mount Lemmon Survey	VER	2.3 km	MPC · JPL
572134	2008 CT_{233}	—	February 8, 2008	Mount Lemmon	Mount Lemmon Survey	EUP	2.9 km	MPC · JPL
572135	2008 CE_{234}	—	August 10, 2016	Haleakala	Pan-STARRS 1	EOS	1.6 km	MPC · JPL
572136	2008 CH_{234}	—	December 14, 2013	Haleakala	Pan-STARRS 1	·	3.1 km	MPC · JPL
572137	2008 CL_{234}	—	April 1, 2014	Mount Lemmon	Mount Lemmon Survey	EOS	1.6 km	MPC · JPL
572138	2008 CP_{234}	—	May 7, 2014	Haleakala	Pan-STARRS 1	EOS	1.3 km	MPC · JPL
572139	2008 CS_{235}	—	November 18, 2017	Haleakala	Pan-STARRS 1	·	2.2 km	MPC · JPL
572140	2008 CM_{236}	—	November 19, 2014	Mount Lemmon	Mount Lemmon Survey	·	1.1 km	MPC · JPL
572141	2008 CO_{237}	—	May 18, 2015	Haleakala	Pan-STARRS 1	·	1.9 km	MPC · JPL
572142	2008 CE_{238}	—	February 8, 2008	Kitt Peak	Spacewatch	·	2.2 km	MPC · JPL
572143	2008 CV_{238}	—	February 9, 2008	Kitt Peak	Spacewatch	·	2.2 km	MPC · JPL
572144	2008 CE_{239}	—	February 3, 2008	Kitt Peak	Spacewatch	EOS	1.4 km	MPC · JPL
572145	2008 CQ_{239}	—	February 1, 2008	Kitt Peak	Spacewatch	·	1.4 km	MPC · JPL
572146	2008 CK_{240}	—	February 14, 2008	Mount Lemmon	Mount Lemmon Survey	·	2.3 km	MPC · JPL
572147	2008 CN_{240}	—	February 2, 2008	Kitt Peak	Spacewatch	·	3.0 km	MPC · JPL
572148	2008 CT_{240}	—	February 2, 2008	Kitt Peak	Spacewatch	·	2.3 km	MPC · JPL
572149	2008 CU_{240}	—	February 10, 2008	Kitt Peak	Spacewatch	·	2.2 km	MPC · JPL
572150	2008 CJ_{243}	—	February 9, 2008	Mount Lemmon	Mount Lemmon Survey	EOS	1.6 km	MPC · JPL
572151	2008 CC_{244}	—	February 10, 2008	Kitt Peak	Spacewatch	·	2.4 km	MPC · JPL
572152	2008 CU_{244}	—	February 10, 2008	Kitt Peak	Spacewatch	·	450 m	MPC · JPL
572153	2008 CV_{244}	—	February 12, 2008	Mount Lemmon	Mount Lemmon Survey	MAR	770 m	MPC · JPL
572154	2008 CW_{244}	—	February 7, 2008	Kitt Peak	Spacewatch	·	980 m	MPC · JPL
572155	2008 DP_{2}	—	January 30, 2008	Mount Lemmon	Mount Lemmon Survey	·	2.6 km	MPC · JPL
572156	2008 DX_{3}	—	January 30, 2008	Mount Lemmon	Mount Lemmon Survey	T_{j} (2.99) · EUP	3.3 km	MPC · JPL
572157	2008 DU_{6}	—	July 4, 2005	Mount Lemmon	Mount Lemmon Survey	EOS	2.2 km	MPC · JPL
572158	2008 DX_{9}	—	January 12, 2008	Kitt Peak	Spacewatch	·	2.5 km	MPC · JPL
572159	2008 DE_{10}	—	January 11, 2008	Kitt Peak	Spacewatch	·	3.1 km	MPC · JPL
572160	2008 DH_{17}	—	January 8, 2008	Gaisberg	Gierlinger, R.	MAS	690 m	MPC · JPL
572161	2008 DD_{22}	—	November 18, 2006	Kitt Peak	Spacewatch	HYG	2.3 km	MPC · JPL
572162	2008 DW_{28}	—	January 11, 2008	Kitt Peak	Spacewatch	·	2.8 km	MPC · JPL
572163	2008 DC_{29}	—	February 9, 2008	Kitt Peak	Spacewatch	·	1.8 km	MPC · JPL
572164	2008 DO_{44}	—	February 10, 2008	Kitt Peak	Spacewatch	·	2.7 km	MPC · JPL
572165	2008 DK_{51}	—	November 19, 1995	Kitt Peak	Spacewatch	·	1.4 km	MPC · JPL
572166	2008 DO_{51}	—	December 18, 2007	Mount Lemmon	Mount Lemmon Survey	EOS	2.1 km	MPC · JPL
572167	2008 DJ_{52}	—	February 29, 2008	Mount Lemmon	Mount Lemmon Survey	EOS	1.9 km	MPC · JPL
572168	2008 DY_{55}	—	February 28, 2008	Kitt Peak	Spacewatch	(895)	3.1 km	MPC · JPL
572169	2008 DT_{56}	—	February 28, 2008	Mount Lemmon	Mount Lemmon Survey	·	1.1 km	MPC · JPL
572170	2008 DH_{63}	—	December 15, 1999	Kitt Peak	Spacewatch	·	820 m	MPC · JPL
572171	2008 DF_{71}	—	February 28, 2008	Mount Lemmon	Mount Lemmon Survey	·	2.6 km	MPC · JPL
572172	2008 DY_{73}	—	February 27, 2008	Mount Lemmon	Mount Lemmon Survey	·	2.3 km	MPC · JPL
572173	2008 DC_{74}	—	September 21, 2001	Kitt Peak	Spacewatch	BRG	1.7 km	MPC · JPL
572174	2008 DP_{75}	—	August 28, 2005	Kitt Peak	Spacewatch	EOS	1.7 km	MPC · JPL
572175	2008 DJ_{77}	—	February 28, 2008	Mount Lemmon	Mount Lemmon Survey	EOS	1.5 km	MPC · JPL
572176	2008 DE_{78}	—	February 28, 2008	Mount Lemmon	Mount Lemmon Survey	·	2.8 km	MPC · JPL
572177	2008 DA_{79}	—	February 29, 2008	Mount Lemmon	Mount Lemmon Survey	·	920 m	MPC · JPL
572178	2008 DE_{80}	—	September 13, 2005	Kitt Peak	Spacewatch	EOS	1.9 km	MPC · JPL
572179	2008 DU_{87}	—	February 7, 2008	Kitt Peak	Spacewatch	MAS	580 m	MPC · JPL
572180	2008 DO_{90}	—	February 18, 2008	Mount Lemmon	Mount Lemmon Survey	·	3.8 km	MPC · JPL
572181	2008 DS_{90}	—	February 28, 2008	Mount Lemmon	Mount Lemmon Survey	·	2.3 km	MPC · JPL
572182	2008 DU_{90}	—	February 16, 2015	Haleakala	Pan-STARRS 1	·	710 m	MPC · JPL
572183	2008 DB_{91}	—	February 26, 2014	Mount Lemmon	Mount Lemmon Survey	·	2.7 km	MPC · JPL
572184	2008 DD_{91}	—	August 2, 2016	Haleakala	Pan-STARRS 1	·	2.3 km	MPC · JPL
572185	2008 DD_{92}	—	February 28, 2008	Mount Lemmon	Mount Lemmon Survey	·	2.5 km	MPC · JPL
572186	2008 DS_{93}	—	August 29, 2016	Mount Lemmon	Mount Lemmon Survey	EOS	1.7 km	MPC · JPL
572187	2008 DR_{94}	—	February 26, 2008	Kitt Peak	Spacewatch	EOS	1.6 km	MPC · JPL
572188	2008 DK_{96}	—	February 24, 2008	Kitt Peak	Spacewatch	·	2.4 km	MPC · JPL
572189	2008 DT_{96}	—	February 28, 2008	Kitt Peak	Spacewatch	·	2.4 km	MPC · JPL
572190	2008 DU_{96}	—	February 28, 2008	Kitt Peak	Spacewatch	·	2.5 km	MPC · JPL
572191	2008 DB_{97}	—	February 28, 2008	Mount Lemmon	Mount Lemmon Survey	·	800 m	MPC · JPL
572192	2008 DG_{97}	—	February 25, 2008	Mount Lemmon	Mount Lemmon Survey	EOS	1.6 km	MPC · JPL
572193	2008 DT_{97}	—	February 18, 2008	Mount Lemmon	Mount Lemmon Survey	·	1.6 km	MPC · JPL
572194	2008 EZ_{2}	—	March 1, 2008	Mount Lemmon	Mount Lemmon Survey	·	1.4 km	MPC · JPL
572195	2008 EA_{4}	—	March 1, 2008	Mount Lemmon	Mount Lemmon Survey	·	2.3 km	MPC · JPL
572196	2008 EM_{8}	—	March 6, 2008	Mount Lemmon	Mount Lemmon Survey	H	450 m	MPC · JPL
572197	2008 EH_{12}	—	March 1, 2008	Kitt Peak	Spacewatch	·	2.3 km	MPC · JPL
572198	2008 EZ_{24}	—	March 3, 2008	Mount Lemmon	Mount Lemmon Survey	·	960 m	MPC · JPL
572199	2008 EE_{27}	—	March 4, 2008	Mount Lemmon	Mount Lemmon Survey	·	3.0 km	MPC · JPL
572200	2008 EF_{27}	—	March 4, 2008	Mount Lemmon	Mount Lemmon Survey	·	950 m	MPC · JPL

== 572201–572300 ==
back to top

Designation			Discovery			Properties		Ref
Permanent	Provisional	Named after	Date	Site	Discoverer(s)	Category	Diam.	Ref
572201	2008 EL_{31}	—	March 5, 2008	Mount Lemmon	Mount Lemmon Survey	V	530 m	MPC · JPL
572202	2008 EN_{31}	—	March 5, 2008	Mount Lemmon	Mount Lemmon Survey	·	1.2 km	MPC · JPL
572203	2008 EM_{43}	—	March 5, 2008	Mount Lemmon	Mount Lemmon Survey	·	2.4 km	MPC · JPL
572204	2008 EH_{51}	—	February 29, 2008	Kitt Peak	Spacewatch	·	750 m	MPC · JPL
572205	2008 ES_{51}	—	March 6, 2008	Mount Lemmon	Mount Lemmon Survey	·	1.4 km	MPC · JPL
572206	2008 EJ_{52}	—	July 27, 2014	Haleakala	Pan-STARRS 1	·	1.1 km	MPC · JPL
572207	2008 EB_{58}	—	March 7, 2008	Mount Lemmon	Mount Lemmon Survey	·	3.1 km	MPC · JPL
572208	2008 EA_{59}	—	July 31, 2005	Palomar	NEAT	·	2.5 km	MPC · JPL
572209	2008 EN_{63}	—	March 9, 2008	Mount Lemmon	Mount Lemmon Survey	·	3.1 km	MPC · JPL
572210	2008 ES_{63}	—	March 8, 2008	Catalina	CSS	EOS	2.4 km	MPC · JPL
572211	2008 EE_{67}	—	March 9, 2008	Mount Lemmon	Mount Lemmon Survey	·	2.9 km	MPC · JPL
572212	2008 EA_{69}	—	January 13, 2004	Kitt Peak	Spacewatch	L5	10 km	MPC · JPL
572213	2008 EU_{72}	—	March 6, 2008	Mount Lemmon	Mount Lemmon Survey	H	330 m	MPC · JPL
572214	2008 EQ_{74}	—	August 27, 2005	Kitt Peak	Spacewatch	·	2.3 km	MPC · JPL
572215	2008 ES_{79}	—	March 8, 2008	Mount Lemmon	Mount Lemmon Survey	·	780 m	MPC · JPL
572216	2008 EK_{83}	—	April 29, 2003	Kitt Peak	Spacewatch	·	3.9 km	MPC · JPL
572217 Dramba	2008 EA_{84}	Dramba	March 11, 2008	La Silla	EURONEAR, -	EOS	1.9 km	MPC · JPL
572218	2008 EO_{85}	—	March 13, 2008	Mount Lemmon	Mount Lemmon Survey	L5	10 km	MPC · JPL
572219	2008 EJ_{93}	—	January 28, 2000	Kitt Peak	Spacewatch	·	1.1 km	MPC · JPL
572220	2008 ET_{94}	—	March 5, 2008	Mount Lemmon	Mount Lemmon Survey	·	2.8 km	MPC · JPL
572221	2008 ED_{96}	—	March 6, 2008	Mount Lemmon	Mount Lemmon Survey	·	4.5 km	MPC · JPL
572222	2008 EQ_{103}	—	March 5, 2008	Mount Lemmon	Mount Lemmon Survey	·	780 m	MPC · JPL
572223	2008 ET_{104}	—	March 6, 2008	Mount Lemmon	Mount Lemmon Survey	EOS	1.7 km	MPC · JPL
572224	2008 EA_{106}	—	March 6, 2008	Mount Lemmon	Mount Lemmon Survey	·	720 m	MPC · JPL
572225	2008 EQ_{110}	—	February 8, 2008	Mount Lemmon	Mount Lemmon Survey	·	2.5 km	MPC · JPL
572226	2008 ED_{111}	—	March 8, 2008	Kitt Peak	Spacewatch	·	2.1 km	MPC · JPL
572227	2008 EU_{111}	—	March 8, 2008	Kitt Peak	Spacewatch	V	410 m	MPC · JPL
572228	2008 EQ_{113}	—	April 25, 2003	Kitt Peak	Spacewatch	VER	2.5 km	MPC · JPL
572229	2008 EW_{113}	—	March 8, 2008	Mount Lemmon	Mount Lemmon Survey	·	1.1 km	MPC · JPL
572230	2008 EA_{115}	—	March 8, 2008	Kitt Peak	Spacewatch	·	900 m	MPC · JPL
572231	2008 EA_{117}	—	March 8, 2008	Kitt Peak	Spacewatch	·	1.0 km	MPC · JPL
572232	2008 EZ_{119}	—	January 27, 2004	Kitt Peak	Spacewatch	NYS	940 m	MPC · JPL
572233	2008 EK_{125}	—	March 10, 2008	Mount Lemmon	Mount Lemmon Survey	EOS	1.8 km	MPC · JPL
572234	2008 EF_{131}	—	March 11, 2008	Mount Lemmon	Mount Lemmon Survey	·	2.4 km	MPC · JPL
572235	2008 EO_{131}	—	March 11, 2008	Kitt Peak	Spacewatch	·	1.1 km	MPC · JPL
572236	2008 EP_{133}	—	March 11, 2008	Mount Lemmon	Mount Lemmon Survey	·	2.5 km	MPC · JPL
572237	2008 EG_{134}	—	March 11, 2008	Mount Lemmon	Mount Lemmon Survey	·	1.1 km	MPC · JPL
572238	2008 ED_{137}	—	February 28, 2008	Kitt Peak	Spacewatch	·	640 m	MPC · JPL
572239	2008 EZ_{137}	—	March 11, 2008	Mount Lemmon	Mount Lemmon Survey	URS	2.6 km	MPC · JPL
572240	2008 EP_{138}	—	March 11, 2008	Mount Lemmon	Mount Lemmon Survey	WIT	960 m	MPC · JPL
572241	2008 EV_{140}	—	March 4, 2008	Kitt Peak	Spacewatch	·	1.2 km	MPC · JPL
572242	2008 EK_{144}	—	May 3, 2008	Mount Lemmon	Mount Lemmon Survey	EOS	1.5 km	MPC · JPL
572243	2008 EP_{161}	—	March 8, 2008	Mount Lemmon	Mount Lemmon Survey	·	2.9 km	MPC · JPL
572244	2008 EO_{164}	—	January 16, 2008	Mount Lemmon	Mount Lemmon Survey	·	2.2 km	MPC · JPL
572245	2008 EV_{171}	—	March 28, 2008	Kitt Peak	Spacewatch	·	1.2 km	MPC · JPL
572246	2008 EL_{172}	—	June 16, 2015	Haleakala	Pan-STARRS 1	·	3.1 km	MPC · JPL
572247	2008 EO_{172}	—	March 10, 2008	Kitt Peak	Spacewatch	·	2.5 km	MPC · JPL
572248	2008 EV_{172}	—	June 12, 2015	Haleakala	Pan-STARRS 1	·	2.8 km	MPC · JPL
572249	2008 EW_{172}	—	October 26, 2011	Haleakala	Pan-STARRS 1	·	2.0 km	MPC · JPL
572250	2008 EY_{172}	—	October 21, 2011	Kitt Peak	Spacewatch	EOS	1.5 km	MPC · JPL
572251	2008 EJ_{173}	—	November 27, 2014	Haleakala	Pan-STARRS 1	·	1.3 km	MPC · JPL
572252	2008 EP_{173}	—	March 15, 2008	Mount Lemmon	Mount Lemmon Survey	·	2.7 km	MPC · JPL
572253	2008 EQ_{173}	—	October 24, 2011	Haleakala	Pan-STARRS 1	·	1.8 km	MPC · JPL
572254	2008 ET_{173}	—	October 10, 2012	Mount Lemmon	Mount Lemmon Survey	·	3.1 km	MPC · JPL
572255	2008 ED_{174}	—	February 26, 2014	Haleakala	Pan-STARRS 1	·	2.9 km	MPC · JPL
572256	2008 EJ_{174}	—	March 14, 2015	Haleakala	Pan-STARRS 1	·	610 m	MPC · JPL
572257	2008 EQ_{174}	—	January 15, 2015	Mount Lemmon	Mount Lemmon Survey	·	1.3 km	MPC · JPL
572258	2008 EW_{174}	—	November 3, 2011	Catalina	CSS	EOS	1.5 km	MPC · JPL
572259	2008 EP_{175}	—	August 13, 2010	Kitt Peak	Spacewatch	·	2.6 km	MPC · JPL
572260	2008 EZ_{175}	—	September 4, 2016	Mount Lemmon	Mount Lemmon Survey	·	2.4 km	MPC · JPL
572261	2008 EC_{176}	—	November 3, 2011	Kitt Peak	Spacewatch	·	2.4 km	MPC · JPL
572262	2008 ES_{176}	—	August 10, 2016	Haleakala	Pan-STARRS 1	·	2.4 km	MPC · JPL
572263	2008 EV_{176}	—	February 26, 2008	Kitt Peak	Spacewatch	THB	2.3 km	MPC · JPL
572264	2008 EH_{177}	—	March 11, 2008	Kitt Peak	Spacewatch	·	940 m	MPC · JPL
572265	2008 EL_{177}	—	August 22, 2010	Sternwarte Hagen	Klein, M.	TIR	2.7 km	MPC · JPL
572266	2008 EG_{179}	—	March 1, 2008	Kitt Peak	Spacewatch	·	860 m	MPC · JPL
572267	2008 EV_{179}	—	October 23, 2011	Kitt Peak	Spacewatch	·	3.1 km	MPC · JPL
572268	2008 ED_{180}	—	January 11, 2016	Haleakala	Pan-STARRS 1	·	2.0 km	MPC · JPL
572269	2008 EV_{180}	—	April 28, 2003	Kitt Peak	Spacewatch	·	2.5 km	MPC · JPL
572270	2008 EF_{181}	—	March 12, 2013	Palomar	Palomar Transient Factory	TEL	1.4 km	MPC · JPL
572271	2008 EG_{181}	—	January 28, 2015	Haleakala	Pan-STARRS 1	·	600 m	MPC · JPL
572272	2008 EX_{181}	—	June 22, 2015	Haleakala	Pan-STARRS 1	EOS	2.0 km	MPC · JPL
572273	2008 EC_{182}	—	April 18, 2015	Cerro Tololo	DECam	·	3.4 km	MPC · JPL
572274	2008 EH_{182}	—	May 25, 2014	Haleakala	Pan-STARRS 1	·	2.0 km	MPC · JPL
572275	2008 ED_{186}	—	December 22, 2012	Haleakala	Pan-STARRS 1	·	2.8 km	MPC · JPL
572276	2008 EA_{187}	—	February 11, 2008	Mount Lemmon	Mount Lemmon Survey	·	2.4 km	MPC · JPL
572277	2008 ET_{188}	—	October 24, 2011	Mount Lemmon	Mount Lemmon Survey	EOS	1.5 km	MPC · JPL
572278	2008 EG_{190}	—	March 13, 2008	Kitt Peak	Spacewatch	L5	7.7 km	MPC · JPL
572279	2008 EL_{190}	—	March 6, 2008	Mount Lemmon	Mount Lemmon Survey	·	2.4 km	MPC · JPL
572280	2008 EM_{190}	—	March 7, 2008	Mount Lemmon	Mount Lemmon Survey	·	2.7 km	MPC · JPL
572281	2008 EQ_{190}	—	March 6, 2008	Mount Lemmon	Mount Lemmon Survey	·	1.0 km	MPC · JPL
572282	2008 EY_{190}	—	March 13, 2008	Kitt Peak	Spacewatch	L5	6.6 km	MPC · JPL
572283	2008 ER_{191}	—	March 12, 2008	Mount Lemmon	Mount Lemmon Survey	EOS	1.6 km	MPC · JPL
572284	2008 ES_{191}	—	March 7, 2008	Kitt Peak	Spacewatch	·	1.6 km	MPC · JPL
572285	2008 EH_{192}	—	March 11, 2008	Kitt Peak	Spacewatch	·	2.0 km	MPC · JPL
572286	2008 EY_{192}	—	March 8, 2008	Mount Lemmon	Mount Lemmon Survey	·	2.3 km	MPC · JPL
572287	2008 EY_{193}	—	March 7, 2008	Mount Lemmon	Mount Lemmon Survey	·	1.4 km	MPC · JPL
572288	2008 EN_{194}	—	March 4, 2008	Mount Lemmon	Mount Lemmon Survey	(1547)	930 m	MPC · JPL
572289	2008 EO_{194}	—	March 6, 2008	Mount Lemmon	Mount Lemmon Survey	·	620 m	MPC · JPL
572290	2008 FL_{21}	—	March 5, 2008	Kitt Peak	Spacewatch	·	2.5 km	MPC · JPL
572291	2008 FN_{22}	—	March 10, 2008	Mount Lemmon	Mount Lemmon Survey	·	1.1 km	MPC · JPL
572292	2008 FT_{29}	—	February 28, 2008	Mount Lemmon	Mount Lemmon Survey	·	950 m	MPC · JPL
572293	2008 FS_{31}	—	March 5, 2008	Mount Lemmon	Mount Lemmon Survey	·	2.9 km	MPC · JPL
572294	2008 FO_{44}	—	March 28, 2008	Mount Lemmon	Mount Lemmon Survey	·	1.1 km	MPC · JPL
572295	2008 FP_{44}	—	March 28, 2008	Mount Lemmon	Mount Lemmon Survey	·	560 m	MPC · JPL
572296	2008 FW_{45}	—	March 28, 2008	Mount Lemmon	Mount Lemmon Survey	·	2.4 km	MPC · JPL
572297	2008 FE_{46}	—	March 28, 2008	Mount Lemmon	Mount Lemmon Survey	URS	2.8 km	MPC · JPL
572298	2008 FV_{47}	—	March 28, 2008	Mount Lemmon	Mount Lemmon Survey	·	800 m	MPC · JPL
572299	2008 FX_{47}	—	March 15, 2008	Mount Lemmon	Mount Lemmon Survey	·	700 m	MPC · JPL
572300	2008 FS_{50}	—	March 28, 2008	Kitt Peak	Spacewatch	·	1.3 km	MPC · JPL

== 572301–572400 ==
back to top

Designation			Discovery			Properties		Ref
Permanent	Provisional	Named after	Date	Site	Discoverer(s)	Category	Diam.	Ref
572301	2008 FQ_{51}	—	March 12, 2008	Kitt Peak	Spacewatch	·	1.0 km	MPC · JPL
572302	2008 FZ_{71}	—	March 30, 2008	Kitt Peak	Spacewatch	·	2.4 km	MPC · JPL
572303	2008 FN_{72}	—	March 30, 2008	Kitt Peak	Spacewatch	·	910 m	MPC · JPL
572304	2008 FV_{74}	—	March 31, 2008	Mount Lemmon	Mount Lemmon Survey	·	2.0 km	MPC · JPL
572305	2008 FH_{83}	—	March 28, 2008	Kitt Peak	Spacewatch	·	410 m	MPC · JPL
572306	2008 FZ_{84}	—	February 28, 2008	Mount Lemmon	Mount Lemmon Survey	·	1.2 km	MPC · JPL
572307	2008 FK_{86}	—	October 8, 2005	Moletai	K. Černis, Zdanavicius, J.	·	3.1 km	MPC · JPL
572308	2008 FR_{89}	—	February 6, 2008	Catalina	CSS	·	2.2 km	MPC · JPL
572309	2008 FS_{94}	—	March 29, 2008	Kitt Peak	Spacewatch	·	1.6 km	MPC · JPL
572310	2008 FZ_{100}	—	March 30, 2008	Kitt Peak	Spacewatch	·	1.1 km	MPC · JPL
572311	2008 FM_{103}	—	March 30, 2008	Kitt Peak	Spacewatch	·	890 m	MPC · JPL
572312	2008 FU_{105}	—	March 10, 2008	Kitt Peak	Spacewatch	·	1.1 km	MPC · JPL
572313	2008 FL_{110}	—	March 31, 2008	Mount Lemmon	Mount Lemmon Survey	·	820 m	MPC · JPL
572314	2008 FD_{113}	—	March 31, 2008	Kitt Peak	Spacewatch	·	840 m	MPC · JPL
572315	2008 FK_{116}	—	March 31, 2008	Mount Lemmon	Mount Lemmon Survey	·	920 m	MPC · JPL
572316	2008 FB_{120}	—	March 31, 2008	Mount Lemmon	Mount Lemmon Survey	L5	6.4 km	MPC · JPL
572317	2008 FS_{122}	—	March 27, 2008	Mount Lemmon	Mount Lemmon Survey	VER	2.4 km	MPC · JPL
572318	2008 FH_{126}	—	February 10, 2008	Kitt Peak	Spacewatch	·	2.3 km	MPC · JPL
572319	2008 FZ_{126}	—	March 31, 2008	Kitt Peak	Spacewatch	·	1.1 km	MPC · JPL
572320	2008 FH_{132}	—	March 27, 2008	Mount Lemmon	Mount Lemmon Survey	L5	6.4 km	MPC · JPL
572321	2008 FU_{139}	—	November 27, 2011	Kitt Peak	Spacewatch	·	3.2 km	MPC · JPL
572322	2008 FN_{141}	—	March 26, 2008	Mount Lemmon	Mount Lemmon Survey	URS	2.2 km	MPC · JPL
572323	2008 FR_{141}	—	March 30, 2008	Kitt Peak	Spacewatch	JUN	810 m	MPC · JPL
572324	2008 FD_{142}	—	March 31, 2008	Mount Lemmon	Mount Lemmon Survey	·	1.0 km	MPC · JPL
572325	2008 FD_{143}	—	March 27, 2008	Kitt Peak	Spacewatch	·	1.7 km	MPC · JPL
572326	2008 FL_{145}	—	March 29, 2008	Kitt Peak	Spacewatch	L5	7.9 km	MPC · JPL
572327	2008 FP_{145}	—	March 31, 2008	Mount Lemmon	Mount Lemmon Survey	L5	8.5 km	MPC · JPL
572328	2008 FZ_{145}	—	March 28, 2008	Mount Lemmon	Mount Lemmon Survey	·	3.1 km	MPC · JPL
572329	2008 FJ_{146}	—	March 30, 2008	Kitt Peak	Spacewatch	L5	6.5 km	MPC · JPL
572330	2008 GB_{11}	—	April 1, 2008	Kitt Peak	Spacewatch	THM	2.1 km	MPC · JPL
572331	2008 GE_{13}	—	April 3, 2008	Kitt Peak	Spacewatch	·	860 m	MPC · JPL
572332	2008 GA_{14}	—	March 1, 2008	Kitt Peak	Spacewatch	EUN	780 m	MPC · JPL
572333	2008 GM_{17}	—	November 16, 2006	Kitt Peak	Spacewatch	·	1.2 km	MPC · JPL
572334	2008 GX_{23}	—	May 17, 1996	Kitt Peak	Spacewatch	·	1.3 km	MPC · JPL
572335	2008 GB_{25}	—	August 30, 2005	Kitt Peak	Spacewatch	(5)	1.4 km	MPC · JPL
572336	2008 GT_{25}	—	April 1, 2008	Mount Lemmon	Mount Lemmon Survey	·	1.7 km	MPC · JPL
572337	2008 GP_{26}	—	April 1, 2008	Kitt Peak	Spacewatch	H	310 m	MPC · JPL
572338	2008 GC_{27}	—	February 12, 2008	Mount Lemmon	Mount Lemmon Survey	·	860 m	MPC · JPL
572339	2008 GT_{27}	—	March 10, 2008	Kitt Peak	Spacewatch	T_{j} (2.85)	2.5 km	MPC · JPL
572340	2008 GW_{37}	—	April 3, 2008	Kitt Peak	Spacewatch	·	1.2 km	MPC · JPL
572341	2008 GF_{40}	—	March 6, 2008	Mount Lemmon	Mount Lemmon Survey	·	860 m	MPC · JPL
572342	2008 GY_{43}	—	February 9, 2008	Mount Lemmon	Mount Lemmon Survey	·	850 m	MPC · JPL
572343	2008 GC_{44}	—	April 4, 2008	Kitt Peak	Spacewatch	·	1.1 km	MPC · JPL
572344	2008 GA_{45}	—	April 4, 2008	Kitt Peak	Spacewatch	·	1.1 km	MPC · JPL
572345	2008 GK_{45}	—	April 4, 2008	Mount Lemmon	Mount Lemmon Survey	·	1.3 km	MPC · JPL
572346	2008 GP_{46}	—	April 4, 2008	Kitt Peak	Spacewatch	VER	2.6 km	MPC · JPL
572347	2008 GA_{47}	—	April 4, 2008	Kitt Peak	Spacewatch	·	2.8 km	MPC · JPL
572348	2008 GD_{52}	—	March 28, 2008	Mount Lemmon	Mount Lemmon Survey	·	2.7 km	MPC · JPL
572349	2008 GY_{55}	—	April 5, 2008	Mount Lemmon	Mount Lemmon Survey	THM	1.7 km	MPC · JPL
572350	2008 GA_{60}	—	April 5, 2008	Kitt Peak	Spacewatch	L5	7.6 km	MPC · JPL
572351	2008 GX_{71}	—	March 28, 2008	Kitt Peak	Spacewatch	·	2.5 km	MPC · JPL
572352	2008 GC_{72}	—	April 7, 2008	Kitt Peak	Spacewatch	·	2.5 km	MPC · JPL
572353	2008 GE_{77}	—	April 3, 2008	Kitt Peak	Spacewatch	·	3.1 km	MPC · JPL
572354	2008 GU_{77}	—	April 3, 2008	Kitt Peak	Spacewatch	·	3.2 km	MPC · JPL
572355	2008 GY_{77}	—	February 1, 2006	Kitt Peak	Spacewatch	L5	8.6 km	MPC · JPL
572356	2008 GR_{78}	—	April 7, 2008	Mount Lemmon	Mount Lemmon Survey	EUP	2.7 km	MPC · JPL
572357	2008 GL_{81}	—	April 7, 2008	Kitt Peak	Spacewatch	EOS	1.7 km	MPC · JPL
572358	2008 GR_{83}	—	March 8, 2008	Mount Lemmon	Mount Lemmon Survey	·	2.7 km	MPC · JPL
572359	2008 GP_{90}	—	March 4, 2008	Mount Lemmon	Mount Lemmon Survey	·	1.1 km	MPC · JPL
572360	2008 GO_{94}	—	March 5, 2008	Kitt Peak	Spacewatch	·	1.0 km	MPC · JPL
572361	2008 GD_{98}	—	October 1, 2005	Mount Lemmon	Mount Lemmon Survey	·	2.8 km	MPC · JPL
572362	2008 GC_{101}	—	April 9, 2008	Kitt Peak	Spacewatch	·	1.0 km	MPC · JPL
572363	2008 GM_{103}	—	April 11, 2008	Kitt Peak	Spacewatch	·	1.1 km	MPC · JPL
572364	2008 GN_{104}	—	March 4, 2008	Mount Lemmon	Mount Lemmon Survey	·	1.2 km	MPC · JPL
572365	2008 GM_{105}	—	April 11, 2008	Catalina	CSS	·	2.4 km	MPC · JPL
572366	2008 GZ_{112}	—	September 13, 2005	Catalina	CSS	EUN	1.7 km	MPC · JPL
572367	2008 GN_{114}	—	April 10, 2008	Catalina	CSS	T_{j} (2.96)	1.8 km	MPC · JPL
572368	2008 GV_{132}	—	April 14, 2008	Mount Lemmon	Mount Lemmon Survey	L5	8.8 km	MPC · JPL
572369	2008 GC_{136}	—	March 28, 2012	Mount Lemmon	Mount Lemmon Survey	·	870 m	MPC · JPL
572370	2008 GT_{136}	—	April 6, 2008	Kitt Peak	Spacewatch	·	970 m	MPC · JPL
572371	2008 GE_{139}	—	April 1, 2008	Kitt Peak	Spacewatch	·	1.5 km	MPC · JPL
572372	2008 GC_{149}	—	April 7, 2008	Kitt Peak	Spacewatch	·	1.5 km	MPC · JPL
572373	2008 GF_{149}	—	April 15, 2008	Kitt Peak	Spacewatch	·	900 m	MPC · JPL
572374	2008 GR_{149}	—	April 1, 2008	Mount Lemmon	Mount Lemmon Survey	L5	10 km	MPC · JPL
572375	2008 GT_{149}	—	October 31, 2011	Mount Lemmon	Mount Lemmon Survey	VER	2.4 km	MPC · JPL
572376	2008 GB_{151}	—	April 4, 2008	Mount Lemmon	Mount Lemmon Survey	·	2.2 km	MPC · JPL
572377	2008 GD_{151}	—	April 3, 2008	Kitt Peak	Spacewatch	·	2.5 km	MPC · JPL
572378	2008 GK_{151}	—	September 3, 2010	Mount Lemmon	Mount Lemmon Survey	ELF	2.9 km	MPC · JPL
572379	2008 GO_{151}	—	September 24, 2011	Mount Lemmon	Mount Lemmon Survey	·	2.0 km	MPC · JPL
572380	2008 GB_{152}	—	July 29, 2009	Kitt Peak	Spacewatch	·	1.3 km	MPC · JPL
572381	2008 GF_{152}	—	February 3, 2013	Haleakala	Pan-STARRS 1	·	2.7 km	MPC · JPL
572382	2008 GH_{152}	—	October 13, 2013	Kitt Peak	Spacewatch	L5	7.9 km	MPC · JPL
572383	2008 GO_{152}	—	November 1, 2013	Mount Lemmon	Mount Lemmon Survey	L5	8.3 km	MPC · JPL
572384	2008 GT_{152}	—	February 16, 2015	Haleakala	Pan-STARRS 1	·	900 m	MPC · JPL
572385	2008 GW_{152}	—	April 24, 2014	Mount Lemmon	Mount Lemmon Survey	·	2.6 km	MPC · JPL
572386	2008 GZ_{152}	—	January 31, 2016	Haleakala	Pan-STARRS 1	H	470 m	MPC · JPL
572387	2008 GU_{155}	—	April 15, 2008	Mount Lemmon	Mount Lemmon Survey	L5	6.6 km	MPC · JPL
572388	2008 GG_{158}	—	February 18, 2015	Haleakala	Pan-STARRS 1	·	930 m	MPC · JPL
572389	2008 GH_{158}	—	April 9, 2008	Mount Lemmon	Mount Lemmon Survey	·	1.7 km	MPC · JPL
572390	2008 GN_{158}	—	September 26, 2011	Haleakala	Pan-STARRS 1	·	2.2 km	MPC · JPL
572391	2008 GA_{159}	—	August 3, 2016	Haleakala	Pan-STARRS 1	V	470 m	MPC · JPL
572392	2008 GJ_{159}	—	March 6, 2013	Haleakala	Pan-STARRS 1	EOS	1.4 km	MPC · JPL
572393	2008 GN_{159}	—	April 1, 2008	Mount Lemmon	Mount Lemmon Survey	·	2.4 km	MPC · JPL
572394	2008 GS_{159}	—	December 27, 2011	Mount Lemmon	Mount Lemmon Survey	·	2.4 km	MPC · JPL
572395	2008 GD_{160}	—	November 29, 2014	Mount Lemmon	Mount Lemmon Survey	·	790 m	MPC · JPL
572396	2008 GB_{161}	—	July 24, 2017	Haleakala	Pan-STARRS 1	·	1.0 km	MPC · JPL
572397	2008 GJ_{161}	—	September 12, 2015	XuYi	PMO NEO Survey Program	·	1.8 km	MPC · JPL
572398	2008 GW_{162}	—	July 13, 2013	Haleakala	Pan-STARRS 1	·	800 m	MPC · JPL
572399	2008 GA_{163}	—	September 26, 2012	Mount Lemmon	Mount Lemmon Survey	L5	8.9 km	MPC · JPL
572400	2008 GC_{163}	—	April 13, 2008	Kitt Peak	Spacewatch	·	2.5 km	MPC · JPL

== 572401–572500 ==
back to top

Designation			Discovery			Properties		Ref
Permanent	Provisional	Named after	Date	Site	Discoverer(s)	Category	Diam.	Ref
572401	2008 GL_{163}	—	October 4, 2013	Kitt Peak	Spacewatch	L5	8.3 km	MPC · JPL
572402	2008 GU_{163}	—	April 6, 2008	Kitt Peak	Spacewatch	L5	6.4 km	MPC · JPL
572403	2008 GG_{166}	—	April 4, 2008	Kitt Peak	Spacewatch	L5	7.8 km	MPC · JPL
572404	2008 GH_{166}	—	April 9, 2008	Kitt Peak	Spacewatch	·	1.8 km	MPC · JPL
572405	2008 GM_{166}	—	October 23, 2011	Kitt Peak	Spacewatch	EOS	1.5 km	MPC · JPL
572406	2008 GG_{167}	—	April 6, 2008	Mount Lemmon	Mount Lemmon Survey	EOS	1.7 km	MPC · JPL
572407	2008 GP_{167}	—	April 1, 2008	Kitt Peak	Spacewatch	·	1.1 km	MPC · JPL
572408	2008 GD_{168}	—	April 5, 2008	Mount Lemmon	Mount Lemmon Survey	L5	6.9 km	MPC · JPL
572409	2008 GR_{168}	—	April 3, 2008	Kitt Peak	Spacewatch	L5	7.1 km	MPC · JPL
572410	2008 HT_{3}	—	April 29, 2008	Kitt Peak	Spacewatch	·	1.2 km	MPC · JPL
572411	2008 HU_{10}	—	April 24, 2008	Kitt Peak	Spacewatch	·	2.6 km	MPC · JPL
572412	2008 HY_{14}	—	August 29, 2005	Kitt Peak	Spacewatch	·	1.3 km	MPC · JPL
572413	2008 HK_{15}	—	April 25, 2008	Kitt Peak	Spacewatch	·	2.4 km	MPC · JPL
572414	2008 HB_{19}	—	March 13, 2008	Kitt Peak	Spacewatch	NYS	870 m	MPC · JPL
572415	2008 HT_{23}	—	April 27, 2008	Kitt Peak	Spacewatch	·	1.0 km	MPC · JPL
572416	2008 HR_{38}	—	April 25, 2008	Mount Lemmon	Mount Lemmon Survey	H	460 m	MPC · JPL
572417	2008 HK_{41}	—	April 26, 2008	Mount Lemmon	Mount Lemmon Survey	BRG	1.2 km	MPC · JPL
572418	2008 HY_{45}	—	April 28, 2008	Kitt Peak	Spacewatch	critical	680 m	MPC · JPL
572419	2008 HS_{48}	—	April 11, 2008	Mount Lemmon	Mount Lemmon Survey	·	1.0 km	MPC · JPL
572420	2008 HF_{51}	—	April 29, 2008	Kitt Peak	Spacewatch	EUN	930 m	MPC · JPL
572421	2008 HA_{56}	—	April 29, 2008	Kitt Peak	Spacewatch	KON	1.9 km	MPC · JPL
572422	2008 HQ_{57}	—	November 3, 2004	Kitt Peak	Spacewatch	·	3.5 km	MPC · JPL
572423	2008 HO_{59}	—	April 5, 2008	Kitt Peak	Spacewatch	THM	1.8 km	MPC · JPL
572424	2008 HH_{64}	—	April 29, 2008	Mount Lemmon	Mount Lemmon Survey	·	1.0 km	MPC · JPL
572425	2008 HH_{68}	—	April 29, 2008	Mount Lemmon	Mount Lemmon Survey	·	910 m	MPC · JPL
572426	2008 HP_{69}	—	April 29, 2008	Mount Lemmon	Mount Lemmon Survey	·	2.0 km	MPC · JPL
572427	2008 HW_{74}	—	April 15, 2012	Haleakala	Pan-STARRS 1	·	910 m	MPC · JPL
572428	2008 HL_{75}	—	April 30, 2008	Mount Lemmon	Mount Lemmon Survey	L5	10 km	MPC · JPL
572429	2008 HT_{75}	—	April 24, 2008	Kitt Peak	Spacewatch	·	890 m	MPC · JPL
572430	2008 HK_{76}	—	April 4, 2016	Haleakala	Pan-STARRS 1	·	980 m	MPC · JPL
572431	2008 JQ_{7}	—	May 3, 2008	Mount Lemmon	Mount Lemmon Survey	·	1.0 km	MPC · JPL
572432	2008 JN_{9}	—	October 22, 2006	Kitt Peak	Spacewatch	·	1.0 km	MPC · JPL
572433	2008 JZ_{9}	—	May 3, 2008	Kitt Peak	Spacewatch	·	2.4 km	MPC · JPL
572434	2008 JF_{20}	—	May 4, 2008	Andrushivka	Y. Ivaščenko	·	1.4 km	MPC · JPL
572435	2008 JU_{24}	—	November 27, 2006	Kitt Peak	Spacewatch	·	2.5 km	MPC · JPL
572436	2008 JZ_{26}	—	February 10, 2007	Catalina	CSS	LIX	4.3 km	MPC · JPL
572437	2008 JS_{29}	—	May 11, 2008	Kitt Peak	Spacewatch	·	710 m	MPC · JPL
572438	2008 JX_{39}	—	May 7, 2008	Kitt Peak	Spacewatch	·	1.7 km	MPC · JPL
572439	2008 JK_{40}	—	May 4, 2008	Kitt Peak	Spacewatch	L5	10 km	MPC · JPL
572440	2008 JO_{40}	—	May 13, 2008	Mount Lemmon	Mount Lemmon Survey	EUN	810 m	MPC · JPL
572441	2008 JW_{42}	—	April 11, 2008	Kitt Peak	Spacewatch	·	1.0 km	MPC · JPL
572442	2008 JD_{43}	—	May 7, 2008	Mount Lemmon	Mount Lemmon Survey	·	1.2 km	MPC · JPL
572443	2008 JE_{43}	—	September 17, 2010	Mount Lemmon	Mount Lemmon Survey	·	2.6 km	MPC · JPL
572444	2008 JF_{43}	—	May 5, 2008	Mount Lemmon	Mount Lemmon Survey	·	960 m	MPC · JPL
572445	2008 JP_{43}	—	May 15, 2008	Mount Lemmon	Mount Lemmon Survey	·	1.2 km	MPC · JPL
572446	2008 JD_{44}	—	May 3, 2008	Mount Lemmon	Mount Lemmon Survey	·	610 m	MPC · JPL
572447	2008 JU_{45}	—	May 3, 2008	Mount Lemmon	Mount Lemmon Survey	·	3.4 km	MPC · JPL
572448	2008 JY_{45}	—	May 5, 2008	Mount Lemmon	Mount Lemmon Survey	·	2.7 km	MPC · JPL
572449	2008 JM_{46}	—	January 20, 2018	Haleakala	Pan-STARRS 1	·	2.0 km	MPC · JPL
572450	2008 JR_{46}	—	May 3, 2008	Mount Lemmon	Mount Lemmon Survey	·	1.9 km	MPC · JPL
572451	2008 JX_{46}	—	May 3, 2008	Kitt Peak	Spacewatch	·	2.0 km	MPC · JPL
572452	2008 JZ_{46}	—	May 15, 2008	Mount Lemmon	Mount Lemmon Survey	·	2.4 km	MPC · JPL
572453	2008 JB_{47}	—	July 11, 2016	Haleakala	Pan-STARRS 1	·	800 m	MPC · JPL
572454	2008 JF_{47}	—	April 29, 2008	Kitt Peak	Spacewatch	EOS	1.4 km	MPC · JPL
572455	2008 JM_{47}	—	October 3, 2013	Kitt Peak	Spacewatch	L5	7.4 km	MPC · JPL
572456	2008 JW_{47}	—	March 15, 2013	Mount Lemmon	Mount Lemmon Survey	·	1.9 km	MPC · JPL
572457	2008 JA_{48}	—	May 3, 2008	Kitt Peak	Spacewatch	EOS	1.6 km	MPC · JPL
572458	2008 JU_{48}	—	April 7, 2013	Mount Lemmon	Mount Lemmon Survey	·	1.1 km	MPC · JPL
572459	2008 JZ_{49}	—	May 3, 2008	Mount Lemmon	Mount Lemmon Survey	·	890 m	MPC · JPL
572460	2008 JA_{51}	—	May 11, 2008	Mount Lemmon	Mount Lemmon Survey	·	2.0 km	MPC · JPL
572461	2008 JB_{51}	—	May 8, 2008	Kitt Peak	Spacewatch	KON	1.8 km	MPC · JPL
572462	2008 JP_{51}	—	May 5, 2008	Mount Lemmon	Mount Lemmon Survey	·	590 m	MPC · JPL
572463	2008 JO_{52}	—	May 7, 2008	Kitt Peak	Spacewatch	·	1.4 km	MPC · JPL
572464	2008 JS_{52}	—	May 5, 2008	Kitt Peak	Spacewatch	·	440 m	MPC · JPL
572465	2008 KQ_{4}	—	May 27, 2008	Kitt Peak	Spacewatch	EUN	750 m	MPC · JPL
572466	2008 KX_{13}	—	May 27, 2008	Kitt Peak	Spacewatch	·	2.3 km	MPC · JPL
572467	2008 KC_{14}	—	April 28, 2008	Kitt Peak	Spacewatch	·	1.1 km	MPC · JPL
572468	2008 KN_{14}	—	April 14, 2008	Mount Lemmon	Mount Lemmon Survey	·	2.3 km	MPC · JPL
572469	2008 KO_{15}	—	April 15, 2008	Mount Lemmon	Mount Lemmon Survey	·	2.2 km	MPC · JPL
572470	2008 KF_{21}	—	May 28, 2008	Kitt Peak	Spacewatch	(5)	1.0 km	MPC · JPL
572471	2008 KU_{24}	—	May 28, 2008	Kitt Peak	Spacewatch	·	2.4 km	MPC · JPL
572472	2008 KX_{24}	—	May 28, 2008	Kitt Peak	Spacewatch	L5	7.9 km	MPC · JPL
572473	2008 KC_{30}	—	May 15, 2008	Mount Lemmon	Mount Lemmon Survey	MAR	880 m	MPC · JPL
572474	2008 KJ_{34}	—	April 14, 2008	Mount Lemmon	Mount Lemmon Survey	L5	6.7 km	MPC · JPL
572475	2008 KQ_{38}	—	May 30, 2008	Kitt Peak	Spacewatch	·	1.0 km	MPC · JPL
572476	2008 KA_{40}	—	May 3, 2008	Mount Lemmon	Mount Lemmon Survey	·	1.0 km	MPC · JPL
572477	2008 KE_{40}	—	November 25, 2005	Kitt Peak	Spacewatch	MAR	1.4 km	MPC · JPL
572478	2008 KA_{41}	—	January 27, 2007	Kitt Peak	Spacewatch	·	2.9 km	MPC · JPL
572479	2008 KY_{41}	—	May 14, 2008	Kitt Peak	Spacewatch	·	1.3 km	MPC · JPL
572480	2008 KU_{43}	—	February 25, 2011	Mount Lemmon	Mount Lemmon Survey	·	1.0 km	MPC · JPL
572481	2008 KV_{43}	—	March 4, 2013	Haleakala	Pan-STARRS 1	(58892)	2.6 km	MPC · JPL
572482	2008 KX_{43}	—	March 5, 2013	Mount Lemmon	Mount Lemmon Survey	EOS	2.0 km	MPC · JPL
572483	2008 KN_{44}	—	January 14, 2011	Mount Lemmon	Mount Lemmon Survey	·	2.3 km	MPC · JPL
572484	2008 KJ_{45}	—	May 27, 2008	Kitt Peak	Spacewatch	·	2.5 km	MPC · JPL
572485	2008 KL_{45}	—	May 31, 2014	Haleakala	Pan-STARRS 1	·	2.2 km	MPC · JPL
572486	2008 KM_{45}	—	March 6, 2013	Haleakala	Pan-STARRS 1	·	2.6 km	MPC · JPL
572487	2008 KP_{45}	—	May 1, 2016	Haleakala	Pan-STARRS 1	·	1.1 km	MPC · JPL
572488	2008 KR_{45}	—	August 30, 2016	Haleakala	Pan-STARRS 1	·	870 m	MPC · JPL
572489	2008 KT_{46}	—	March 19, 2013	Haleakala	Pan-STARRS 1	·	2.4 km	MPC · JPL
572490	2008 KH_{47}	—	May 27, 2008	Kitt Peak	Spacewatch	L5	7.5 km	MPC · JPL
572491	2008 KL_{47}	—	February 12, 2018	Haleakala	Pan-STARRS 1	·	1.8 km	MPC · JPL
572492	2008 KH_{48}	—	April 30, 2014	Haleakala	Pan-STARRS 1	·	2.8 km	MPC · JPL
572493	2008 LB_{7}	—	May 13, 2008	Mount Lemmon	Mount Lemmon Survey	EUN	790 m	MPC · JPL
572494	2008 LY_{8}	—	April 16, 2008	Mount Lemmon	Mount Lemmon Survey	·	1.2 km	MPC · JPL
572495	2008 LP_{13}	—	September 23, 2000	Socorro	LINEAR	·	1.0 km	MPC · JPL
572496	2008 LP_{14}	—	June 8, 2008	Kitt Peak	Spacewatch	EOS	1.6 km	MPC · JPL
572497	2008 LJ_{15}	—	May 28, 2008	Kitt Peak	Spacewatch	EUN	960 m	MPC · JPL
572498	2008 LM_{18}	—	June 2, 2008	Mount Lemmon	Mount Lemmon Survey	·	2.1 km	MPC · JPL
572499	2008 LV_{18}	—	January 25, 2011	Mount Lemmon	Mount Lemmon Survey	·	980 m	MPC · JPL
572500	2008 LZ_{18}	—	April 24, 2012	Kitt Peak	Spacewatch	EUN	940 m	MPC · JPL

== 572501–572600 ==
back to top

Designation			Discovery			Properties		Ref
Permanent	Provisional	Named after	Date	Site	Discoverer(s)	Category	Diam.	Ref
572501	2008 LX_{19}	—	September 25, 2016	Haleakala	Pan-STARRS 1	·	2.7 km	MPC · JPL
572502	2008 LK_{20}	—	November 16, 2010	Charleston	R. Holmes	ARM	2.9 km	MPC · JPL
572503	2008 LP_{20}	—	May 7, 2014	Haleakala	Pan-STARRS 1	·	2.6 km	MPC · JPL
572504	2008 NO_{5}	—	July 3, 2008	Siding Spring	SSS	·	1.6 km	MPC · JPL
572505	2008 OJ_{6}	—	May 28, 2008	Mount Lemmon	Mount Lemmon Survey	·	1.6 km	MPC · JPL
572506	2008 OX_{13}	—	July 30, 2008	La Sagra	OAM	·	1.5 km	MPC · JPL
572507	2008 OE_{17}	—	July 29, 2008	Mount Lemmon	Mount Lemmon Survey	·	1.6 km	MPC · JPL
572508	2008 OJ_{26}	—	February 18, 2015	Haleakala	Pan-STARRS 1	HNS	1.1 km	MPC · JPL
572509	2008 ON_{26}	—	July 30, 2008	Mount Lemmon	Mount Lemmon Survey	·	1.9 km	MPC · JPL
572510	2008 OZ_{26}	—	July 29, 2008	Kitt Peak	Spacewatch	V	540 m	MPC · JPL
572511	2008 OE_{27}	—	November 6, 2013	Haleakala	Pan-STARRS 1	·	1.5 km	MPC · JPL
572512	2008 OG_{27}	—	February 10, 2011	Mount Lemmon	Mount Lemmon Survey	·	1.3 km	MPC · JPL
572513	2008 OL_{27}	—	February 3, 2016	Haleakala	Pan-STARRS 1	·	1.4 km	MPC · JPL
572514	2008 PS_{9}	—	July 29, 2008	Kitt Peak	Spacewatch	H	520 m	MPC · JPL
572515	2008 PT_{12}	—	August 9, 2008	La Sagra	OAM	EUN	1.2 km	MPC · JPL
572516	2008 PF_{21}	—	August 5, 2008	Siding Spring	SSS	·	1.8 km	MPC · JPL
572517	2008 PB_{24}	—	August 4, 2008	La Sagra	OAM	·	630 m	MPC · JPL
572518	2008 QE	—	July 28, 2008	Mount Lemmon	Mount Lemmon Survey	·	1.7 km	MPC · JPL
572519	2008 QT_{1}	—	August 24, 2008	La Sagra	OAM	EUN	1.3 km	MPC · JPL
572520	2008 QE_{3}	—	August 24, 2008	Observatoire des T	Jacquinot, H.	·	770 m	MPC · JPL
572521	2008 QH_{4}	—	August 20, 2008	Kitt Peak	Spacewatch	PHO	920 m	MPC · JPL
572522	2008 QL_{14}	—	January 10, 2006	Kitt Peak	Spacewatch	·	1.5 km	MPC · JPL
572523	2008 QS_{14}	—	August 20, 2008	Kitt Peak	Spacewatch	·	3.1 km	MPC · JPL
572524	2008 QZ_{18}	—	August 29, 2008	Dauban	Kugel, C. R. F.	·	1.3 km	MPC · JPL
572525	2008 QG_{19}	—	August 23, 2008	Goodricke-Pigott	R. A. Tucker	JUN	1.4 km	MPC · JPL
572526	2008 QZ_{19}	—	August 30, 2008	Prairie Grass	Mahony, J.	·	2.0 km	MPC · JPL
572527	2008 QF_{22}	—	August 26, 2008	Socorro	LINEAR	·	1.5 km	MPC · JPL
572528	2008 QN_{22}	—	January 22, 2006	Mount Lemmon	Mount Lemmon Survey	EUN	1.2 km	MPC · JPL
572529	2008 QO_{25}	—	August 30, 2008	Altschwendt	W. Ries	·	1.8 km	MPC · JPL
572530	2008 QM_{30}	—	August 30, 2008	Socorro	LINEAR	·	1.6 km	MPC · JPL
572531	2008 QH_{35}	—	August 31, 2008	Moletai	K. Černis, Zdanavicius, J.	·	760 m	MPC · JPL
572532	2008 QN_{38}	—	September 4, 2008	Goodricke-Pigott	R. A. Tucker	·	1.6 km	MPC · JPL
572533	2008 QK_{39}	—	August 24, 2008	Kitt Peak	Spacewatch	·	1.1 km	MPC · JPL
572534	2008 QA_{43}	—	August 24, 2008	Črni Vrh	Skvarč, J.	·	1.1 km	MPC · JPL
572535	2008 QJ_{46}	—	January 28, 2007	Kitt Peak	Spacewatch	H	460 m	MPC · JPL
572536	2008 QZ_{48}	—	April 24, 2014	Mount Lemmon	Mount Lemmon Survey	·	600 m	MPC · JPL
572537	2008 QZ_{50}	—	August 24, 2008	Kitt Peak	Spacewatch	·	2.0 km	MPC · JPL
572538	2008 RY	—	September 1, 2008	La Sagra	OAM	H	500 m	MPC · JPL
572539	2008 RU_{3}	—	September 2, 2008	Kitt Peak	Spacewatch	·	1.5 km	MPC · JPL
572540	2008 RA_{7}	—	September 3, 2008	Kitt Peak	Spacewatch	·	530 m	MPC · JPL
572541	2008 RB_{8}	—	August 23, 2008	Goodricke-Pigott	R. A. Tucker	·	810 m	MPC · JPL
572542	2008 RO_{10}	—	September 3, 2008	Kitt Peak	Spacewatch	·	1.5 km	MPC · JPL
572543	2008 RO_{14}	—	February 2, 2006	Kitt Peak	Spacewatch	PAD	1.4 km	MPC · JPL
572544	2008 RS_{14}	—	August 24, 2008	Kitt Peak	Spacewatch	MRX	1.0 km	MPC · JPL
572545	2008 RG_{22}	—	September 3, 2008	La Sagra	OAM	LEO	1.8 km	MPC · JPL
572546	2008 RG_{31}	—	September 2, 2008	Kitt Peak	Spacewatch	·	1.3 km	MPC · JPL
572547	2008 RL_{47}	—	September 6, 2008	Mount Lemmon	Mount Lemmon Survey	·	690 m	MPC · JPL
572548	2008 RP_{56}	—	August 24, 2008	Kitt Peak	Spacewatch	ADE	1.6 km	MPC · JPL
572549	2008 RR_{58}	—	September 3, 2008	Kitt Peak	Spacewatch	·	1.3 km	MPC · JPL
572550	2008 RN_{59}	—	September 3, 2008	Kitt Peak	Spacewatch	AEO	940 m	MPC · JPL
572551	2008 RY_{59}	—	August 8, 2008	La Sagra	OAM	·	1.4 km	MPC · JPL
572552	2008 RV_{61}	—	September 4, 2008	Kitt Peak	Spacewatch	·	1.8 km	MPC · JPL
572553	2008 RK_{65}	—	September 4, 2008	Kitt Peak	Spacewatch	·	1.4 km	MPC · JPL
572554	2008 RS_{66}	—	September 4, 2008	Kitt Peak	Spacewatch	·	1.7 km	MPC · JPL
572555	2008 RZ_{68}	—	September 4, 2008	Kitt Peak	Spacewatch	·	690 m	MPC · JPL
572556	2008 RU_{70}	—	September 6, 2008	Mount Lemmon	Mount Lemmon Survey	·	910 m	MPC · JPL
572557	2008 RS_{72}	—	December 2, 2005	Kitt Peak	Wasserman, L. H., Millis, R. L.	·	1.6 km	MPC · JPL
572558	2008 RV_{75}	—	August 21, 2008	Kitt Peak	Spacewatch	·	910 m	MPC · JPL
572559	2008 RG_{77}	—	September 6, 2008	Mount Lemmon	Mount Lemmon Survey	·	590 m	MPC · JPL
572560	2008 RA_{78}	—	November 10, 2004	Kitt Peak	Spacewatch	·	2.6 km	MPC · JPL
572561	2008 RJ_{78}	—	September 10, 2008	Wrightwood	J. W. Young	·	750 m	MPC · JPL
572562	2008 RN_{81}	—	September 4, 2008	Kitt Peak	Spacewatch	·	1.3 km	MPC · JPL
572563	2008 RG_{88}	—	September 5, 2008	Kitt Peak	Spacewatch	·	1.2 km	MPC · JPL
572564	2008 RM_{108}	—	September 9, 2008	Mount Lemmon	Mount Lemmon Survey	·	590 m	MPC · JPL
572565	2008 RB_{122}	—	September 3, 2008	Kitt Peak	Spacewatch	·	1.2 km	MPC · JPL
572566	2008 RP_{123}	—	September 6, 2008	Kitt Peak	Spacewatch	·	1.1 km	MPC · JPL
572567	2008 RM_{124}	—	January 26, 2006	Kitt Peak	Spacewatch	·	1.8 km	MPC · JPL
572568	2008 RH_{132}	—	April 25, 2014	Mount Lemmon	Mount Lemmon Survey	·	750 m	MPC · JPL
572569	2008 RZ_{132}	—	September 9, 2008	Catalina	CSS	·	900 m	MPC · JPL
572570	2008 RS_{135}	—	September 3, 2008	Kitt Peak	Spacewatch	·	510 m	MPC · JPL
572571	2008 RO_{139}	—	September 7, 2008	Mount Lemmon	Mount Lemmon Survey	H	430 m	MPC · JPL
572572	2008 RK_{140}	—	September 9, 2008	Mount Lemmon	Mount Lemmon Survey	·	1.5 km	MPC · JPL
572573	2008 RH_{142}	—	September 6, 2008	Kitt Peak	Spacewatch	·	500 m	MPC · JPL
572574	2008 RB_{143}	—	March 7, 2002	Siding Spring	R. H. McNaught	·	1.6 km	MPC · JPL
572575	2008 RA_{147}	—	February 20, 2006	Mount Lemmon	Mount Lemmon Survey	PAD	1.3 km	MPC · JPL
572576	2008 RR_{147}	—	April 6, 2003	Kitt Peak	Spacewatch	L4	10 km	MPC · JPL
572577	2008 RD_{148}	—	September 2, 2008	Kitt Peak	Spacewatch	·	1.5 km	MPC · JPL
572578	2008 RY_{148}	—	January 27, 2006	Mount Lemmon	Mount Lemmon Survey	·	2.6 km	MPC · JPL
572579	2008 RL_{149}	—	January 26, 2006	Kitt Peak	Spacewatch	·	1.3 km	MPC · JPL
572580	2008 RM_{149}	—	September 12, 2008	Piszkéstető	K. Sárneczky	·	740 m	MPC · JPL
572581	2008 RT_{149}	—	September 5, 2008	Kitt Peak	Spacewatch	·	1.8 km	MPC · JPL
572582	2008 RU_{149}	—	September 9, 2008	Mount Lemmon	Mount Lemmon Survey	PAD	1.6 km	MPC · JPL
572583	2008 RX_{149}	—	September 5, 2008	Kitt Peak	Spacewatch	·	1.4 km	MPC · JPL
572584	2008 RF_{150}	—	March 13, 2015	Mount Lemmon	Mount Lemmon Survey	·	1.4 km	MPC · JPL
572585	2008 RJ_{150}	—	April 30, 2014	Haleakala	Pan-STARRS 1	·	670 m	MPC · JPL
572586	2008 RW_{150}	—	July 30, 2008	Kitt Peak	Spacewatch	·	1.5 km	MPC · JPL
572587	2008 RE_{151}	—	September 7, 2008	Mount Lemmon	Mount Lemmon Survey	·	1.4 km	MPC · JPL
572588	2008 RF_{151}	—	September 6, 2008	Mount Lemmon	Mount Lemmon Survey	·	1.4 km	MPC · JPL
572589	2008 RR_{151}	—	September 9, 2008	Mount Lemmon	Mount Lemmon Survey	·	1.6 km	MPC · JPL
572590	2008 RV_{151}	—	September 7, 2008	Mount Lemmon	Mount Lemmon Survey	·	1.4 km	MPC · JPL
572591	2008 RE_{152}	—	September 6, 2008	Mount Lemmon	Mount Lemmon Survey	·	1.4 km	MPC · JPL
572592	2008 RF_{152}	—	September 4, 2008	Kitt Peak	Spacewatch	·	1.3 km	MPC · JPL
572593	2008 RJ_{152}	—	September 9, 2008	Catalina	CSS	EUN	1.3 km	MPC · JPL
572594	2008 RQ_{152}	—	September 6, 2008	Mount Lemmon	Mount Lemmon Survey	·	1.2 km	MPC · JPL
572595	2008 RR_{152}	—	September 9, 2008	Bergisch Gladbach	W. Bickel	·	1.6 km	MPC · JPL
572596	2008 RT_{152}	—	September 5, 2008	Kitt Peak	Spacewatch	·	1.3 km	MPC · JPL
572597	2008 RR_{154}	—	September 3, 2008	Kitt Peak	Spacewatch	·	1.2 km	MPC · JPL
572598	2008 RZ_{155}	—	January 30, 2011	Mount Lemmon	Mount Lemmon Survey	·	2.4 km	MPC · JPL
572599	2008 RB_{156}	—	September 3, 2008	Kitt Peak	Spacewatch	·	530 m	MPC · JPL
572600	2008 RF_{156}	—	September 4, 2008	Kitt Peak	Spacewatch	·	2.2 km	MPC · JPL

== 572601–572700 ==
back to top

Designation			Discovery			Properties		Ref
Permanent	Provisional	Named after	Date	Site	Discoverer(s)	Category	Diam.	Ref
572601	2008 RZ_{157}	—	February 21, 2017	Haleakala	Pan-STARRS 1	·	560 m	MPC · JPL
572602	2008 RQ_{161}	—	October 4, 2013	Mount Lemmon	Mount Lemmon Survey	·	1.7 km	MPC · JPL
572603	2008 RZ_{161}	—	January 17, 2015	Mount Lemmon	Mount Lemmon Survey	·	1.5 km	MPC · JPL
572604	2008 RD_{162}	—	September 7, 2008	Mount Lemmon	Mount Lemmon Survey	·	1.3 km	MPC · JPL
572605	2008 RO_{162}	—	October 22, 2012	Mount Lemmon	Mount Lemmon Survey	·	850 m	MPC · JPL
572606	2008 RX_{163}	—	September 7, 2008	Mount Lemmon	Mount Lemmon Survey	·	1.9 km	MPC · JPL
572607	2008 RD_{164}	—	September 5, 2008	Kitt Peak	Spacewatch	V	390 m	MPC · JPL
572608	2008 RK_{166}	—	October 12, 2013	Kitt Peak	Spacewatch	AGN	1.0 km	MPC · JPL
572609	2008 RQ_{170}	—	September 6, 2008	Kitt Peak	Spacewatch	·	1.2 km	MPC · JPL
572610	2008 RK_{171}	—	September 3, 2008	Kitt Peak	Spacewatch	·	3.7 km	MPC · JPL
572611	2008 RK_{172}	—	September 3, 2008	Kitt Peak	Spacewatch	L4	6.2 km	MPC · JPL
572612	2008 SO_{2}	—	September 7, 2008	Catalina	CSS	·	1.1 km	MPC · JPL
572613	2008 SO_{7}	—	September 23, 2008	Mount Lemmon	Mount Lemmon Survey	MRX	1.4 km	MPC · JPL
572614	2008 SZ_{7}	—	August 31, 2008	Moletai	K. Černis, Zdanavicius, J.	·	900 m	MPC · JPL
572615	2008 SY_{11}	—	September 22, 2008	Catalina	CSS	·	2.2 km	MPC · JPL
572616	2008 SZ_{12}	—	September 24, 2008	Mount Lemmon	Mount Lemmon Survey	·	1.7 km	MPC · JPL
572617	2008 SE_{15}	—	September 19, 2008	Kitt Peak	Spacewatch	·	1.8 km	MPC · JPL
572618	2008 SH_{17}	—	September 19, 2008	Kitt Peak	Spacewatch	·	1.1 km	MPC · JPL
572619	2008 SW_{17}	—	August 7, 2008	Kitt Peak	Spacewatch	·	1.2 km	MPC · JPL
572620	2008 SY_{17}	—	September 19, 2008	Kitt Peak	Spacewatch	·	1.4 km	MPC · JPL
572621	2008 SA_{19}	—	September 19, 2008	Kitt Peak	Spacewatch	·	1.2 km	MPC · JPL
572622	2008 SJ_{20}	—	April 5, 2003	Kitt Peak	Spacewatch	L4	7.9 km	MPC · JPL
572623	2008 SG_{23}	—	December 1, 2005	Kitt Peak	Wasserman, L. H., Millis, R. L.	·	1.6 km	MPC · JPL
572624	2008 SJ_{24}	—	January 28, 2006	Mount Lemmon	Mount Lemmon Survey	·	1.7 km	MPC · JPL
572625	2008 SY_{24}	—	September 6, 2008	Kitt Peak	Spacewatch	·	530 m	MPC · JPL
572626	2008 SM_{27}	—	August 24, 2008	Kitt Peak	Spacewatch	·	1.3 km	MPC · JPL
572627	2008 SN_{30}	—	May 26, 2003	Kitt Peak	Spacewatch	·	1.8 km	MPC · JPL
572628	2008 SX_{35}	—	August 21, 2008	Kitt Peak	Spacewatch	·	1.5 km	MPC · JPL
572629	2008 SZ_{47}	—	September 5, 2008	Kitt Peak	Spacewatch	·	1.4 km	MPC · JPL
572630	2008 SH_{53}	—	September 3, 2008	Kitt Peak	Spacewatch	·	620 m	MPC · JPL
572631	2008 SQ_{53}	—	September 20, 2008	Mount Lemmon	Mount Lemmon Survey	·	1.3 km	MPC · JPL
572632	2008 SZ_{55}	—	September 20, 2008	Kitt Peak	Spacewatch	·	1.6 km	MPC · JPL
572633	2008 SL_{72}	—	September 22, 2008	Kitt Peak	Spacewatch	·	1.5 km	MPC · JPL
572634	2008 SV_{77}	—	August 24, 2008	Kitt Peak	Spacewatch	·	1.3 km	MPC · JPL
572635	2008 SX_{78}	—	October 17, 1995	Kitt Peak	Spacewatch	·	1.3 km	MPC · JPL
572636	2008 SO_{84}	—	September 27, 2008	Taunus	Taunus	·	1.5 km	MPC · JPL
572637	2008 SC_{90}	—	September 21, 2008	Kitt Peak	Spacewatch	·	590 m	MPC · JPL
572638	2008 SL_{90}	—	September 21, 2008	Kitt Peak	Spacewatch	·	1.7 km	MPC · JPL
572639	2008 SK_{93}	—	March 10, 2007	Mount Lemmon	Mount Lemmon Survey	·	660 m	MPC · JPL
572640	2008 SN_{99}	—	September 21, 2008	Kitt Peak	Spacewatch	ADE	1.9 km	MPC · JPL
572641	2008 SV_{99}	—	September 21, 2008	Kitt Peak	Spacewatch	·	1.6 km	MPC · JPL
572642	2008 SH_{113}	—	September 4, 2008	Kitt Peak	Spacewatch	·	1.4 km	MPC · JPL
572643	2008 SL_{117}	—	September 22, 2008	Mount Lemmon	Mount Lemmon Survey	·	500 m	MPC · JPL
572644	2008 SL_{119}	—	September 22, 2008	Mount Lemmon	Mount Lemmon Survey	·	1.6 km	MPC · JPL
572645	2008 SB_{122}	—	September 22, 2008	Mount Lemmon	Mount Lemmon Survey	HOF	2.2 km	MPC · JPL
572646	2008 ST_{125}	—	September 22, 2008	Mount Lemmon	Mount Lemmon Survey	·	1.5 km	MPC · JPL
572647	2008 SA_{132}	—	September 22, 2008	Kitt Peak	Spacewatch	·	1.2 km	MPC · JPL
572648	2008 SU_{136}	—	September 23, 2008	Kitt Peak	Spacewatch	·	1.2 km	MPC · JPL
572649	2008 SR_{138}	—	September 23, 2008	Kitt Peak	Spacewatch	AGN	950 m	MPC · JPL
572650	2008 SW_{138}	—	September 28, 2003	Kitt Peak	Spacewatch	·	1.6 km	MPC · JPL
572651	2008 SC_{141}	—	September 24, 2008	Mount Lemmon	Mount Lemmon Survey	·	1.8 km	MPC · JPL
572652	2008 SM_{142}	—	September 6, 2008	Mount Lemmon	Mount Lemmon Survey	·	500 m	MPC · JPL
572653	2008 SZ_{154}	—	September 6, 2008	Catalina	CSS	·	1.5 km	MPC · JPL
572654	2008 SZ_{156}	—	September 5, 2008	Goodricke-Pigott	R. A. Tucker	·	1.7 km	MPC · JPL
572655	2008 SC_{159}	—	September 24, 2008	Socorro	LINEAR	·	660 m	MPC · JPL
572656	2008 SW_{160}	—	September 19, 2008	Kitt Peak	Spacewatch	·	1.6 km	MPC · JPL
572657	2008 SL_{161}	—	September 27, 2008	Andrushivka	Ostafijchuk, P., Y. Ivaščenko	(18466)	2.3 km	MPC · JPL
572658	2008 SJ_{177}	—	September 23, 2008	Mount Lemmon	Mount Lemmon Survey	H	450 m	MPC · JPL
572659	2008 SR_{185}	—	September 24, 2008	Bergisch Gladbach	W. Bickel	L4	7.5 km	MPC · JPL
572660	2008 SQ_{187}	—	September 25, 2008	Kitt Peak	Spacewatch	·	1.5 km	MPC · JPL
572661	2008 SE_{188}	—	September 25, 2008	Kitt Peak	Spacewatch	EUN	740 m	MPC · JPL
572662	2008 SQ_{188}	—	September 25, 2008	Kitt Peak	Spacewatch	·	1.4 km	MPC · JPL
572663	2008 SX_{191}	—	September 25, 2008	Kitt Peak	Spacewatch	·	2.0 km	MPC · JPL
572664	2008 SC_{193}	—	September 25, 2008	Kitt Peak	Spacewatch	·	1.4 km	MPC · JPL
572665	2008 SD_{197}	—	September 21, 2003	Palomar	NEAT	·	1.8 km	MPC · JPL
572666	2008 SJ_{197}	—	September 6, 2008	Mount Lemmon	Mount Lemmon Survey	·	1.8 km	MPC · JPL
572667	2008 SA_{207}	—	April 20, 2007	Kitt Peak	Spacewatch	·	770 m	MPC · JPL
572668	2008 SQ_{210}	—	September 21, 2008	Kitt Peak	Spacewatch	·	1.8 km	MPC · JPL
572669	2008 ST_{210}	—	September 28, 2008	Catalina	CSS	MAR	1.1 km	MPC · JPL
572670	2008 SQ_{215}	—	September 29, 2008	Mount Lemmon	Mount Lemmon Survey	·	1.2 km	MPC · JPL
572671	2008 SC_{222}	—	September 25, 2008	Mount Lemmon	Mount Lemmon Survey	·	2.4 km	MPC · JPL
572672	2008 SR_{224}	—	September 26, 2008	Kitt Peak	Spacewatch	·	1.4 km	MPC · JPL
572673	2008 SK_{225}	—	April 7, 2007	Mount Lemmon	Mount Lemmon Survey	·	1.2 km	MPC · JPL
572674	2008 SW_{227}	—	September 28, 2008	Mount Lemmon	Mount Lemmon Survey	GEF	1.0 km	MPC · JPL
572675	2008 SC_{228}	—	October 13, 1999	Apache Point	SDSS	·	1.6 km	MPC · JPL
572676	2008 SY_{228}	—	September 28, 2008	Mount Lemmon	Mount Lemmon Survey	·	1.5 km	MPC · JPL
572677	2008 SZ_{228}	—	November 17, 2004	Campo Imperatore	CINEOS	·	1.8 km	MPC · JPL
572678	2008 SP_{234}	—	September 2, 2008	Kitt Peak	Spacewatch	·	800 m	MPC · JPL
572679	2008 SM_{237}	—	September 2, 2008	Kitt Peak	Spacewatch	·	560 m	MPC · JPL
572680	2008 SO_{237}	—	March 11, 2007	Mount Lemmon	Mount Lemmon Survey	·	630 m	MPC · JPL
572681	2008 SW_{238}	—	May 12, 2007	Mount Lemmon	Mount Lemmon Survey	·	1.7 km	MPC · JPL
572682	2008 SM_{252}	—	November 6, 2005	Mount Lemmon	Mount Lemmon Survey	·	510 m	MPC · JPL
572683	2008 SH_{263}	—	September 24, 2008	Kitt Peak	Spacewatch	·	1.4 km	MPC · JPL
572684	2008 SL_{263}	—	September 24, 2008	Kitt Peak	Spacewatch	·	570 m	MPC · JPL
572685	2008 SJ_{268}	—	September 25, 2008	Kitt Peak	Spacewatch	PAD	1.2 km	MPC · JPL
572686	2008 SU_{269}	—	September 22, 2008	Mount Lemmon	Mount Lemmon Survey	PAD	1.4 km	MPC · JPL
572687	2008 SX_{272}	—	September 25, 2008	Kitt Peak	Spacewatch	·	1.7 km	MPC · JPL
572688	2008 SW_{273}	—	September 19, 2008	Kitt Peak	Spacewatch	L4	8.0 km	MPC · JPL
572689	2008 SM_{289}	—	September 26, 2008	Kitt Peak	Spacewatch	·	1.4 km	MPC · JPL
572690	2008 SW_{297}	—	October 4, 1999	Kitt Peak	Spacewatch	·	1.7 km	MPC · JPL
572691	2008 SY_{300}	—	September 23, 2008	Socorro	LINEAR	·	750 m	MPC · JPL
572692	2008 SV_{303}	—	September 24, 2008	Mount Lemmon	Mount Lemmon Survey	·	1.5 km	MPC · JPL
572693	2008 SB_{314}	—	September 23, 2008	Mount Lemmon	Mount Lemmon Survey	·	2.0 km	MPC · JPL
572694	2008 SG_{314}	—	September 21, 2008	Kitt Peak	Spacewatch	·	1.7 km	MPC · JPL
572695	2008 SQ_{314}	—	September 25, 2008	Kitt Peak	Spacewatch	·	1.1 km	MPC · JPL
572696	2008 SV_{314}	—	September 22, 2008	Mount Lemmon	Mount Lemmon Survey	·	710 m	MPC · JPL
572697	2008 SP_{315}	—	September 24, 2008	Mount Lemmon	Mount Lemmon Survey	·	2.0 km	MPC · JPL
572698	2008 SZ_{315}	—	February 17, 2010	Kitt Peak	Spacewatch	·	750 m	MPC · JPL
572699	2008 SJ_{316}	—	September 23, 2008	Mount Lemmon	Mount Lemmon Survey	·	1.2 km	MPC · JPL
572700	2008 SO_{316}	—	September 22, 2008	Kitt Peak	Spacewatch	·	1.4 km	MPC · JPL

== 572701–572800 ==
back to top

Designation			Discovery			Properties		Ref
Permanent	Provisional	Named after	Date	Site	Discoverer(s)	Category	Diam.	Ref
572701	2008 SY_{316}	—	September 20, 2008	Mount Lemmon	Mount Lemmon Survey	·	1.4 km	MPC · JPL
572702	2008 SF_{317}	—	September 21, 2008	Mount Lemmon	Mount Lemmon Survey	WIT	730 m	MPC · JPL
572703	2008 SP_{317}	—	September 24, 2008	Mount Lemmon	Mount Lemmon Survey	·	1.5 km	MPC · JPL
572704	2008 SS_{317}	—	September 28, 2008	Mount Lemmon	Mount Lemmon Survey	·	1.4 km	MPC · JPL
572705	2008 SC_{318}	—	December 15, 2004	Socorro	LINEAR	·	1.4 km	MPC · JPL
572706	2008 SR_{318}	—	September 29, 2008	Mount Lemmon	Mount Lemmon Survey	·	1.5 km	MPC · JPL
572707	2008 SS_{318}	—	July 30, 2008	Mount Lemmon	Mount Lemmon Survey	·	970 m	MPC · JPL
572708	2008 SG_{321}	—	September 22, 2008	Kitt Peak	Spacewatch	MAS	510 m	MPC · JPL
572709	2008 SY_{321}	—	September 25, 2008	Kitt Peak	Spacewatch	·	1.3 km	MPC · JPL
572710	2008 SD_{324}	—	September 23, 2008	Mount Lemmon	Mount Lemmon Survey	·	630 m	MPC · JPL
572711	2008 SO_{325}	—	September 23, 2008	Kitt Peak	Spacewatch	·	1.5 km	MPC · JPL
572712	2008 SB_{326}	—	September 23, 2008	Kitt Peak	Spacewatch	·	1.5 km	MPC · JPL
572713	2008 SL_{326}	—	September 24, 2008	Mount Lemmon	Mount Lemmon Survey	·	1.3 km	MPC · JPL
572714	2008 SR_{326}	—	August 4, 2017	Haleakala	Pan-STARRS 1	·	1.3 km	MPC · JPL
572715	2008 SG_{327}	—	May 3, 2016	Mount Lemmon	Mount Lemmon Survey	EUN	1.0 km	MPC · JPL
572716	2008 SR_{327}	—	September 25, 2008	Kitt Peak	Spacewatch	·	560 m	MPC · JPL
572717	2008 SE_{328}	—	September 23, 2008	Kitt Peak	Spacewatch	H	300 m	MPC · JPL
572718	2008 SK_{328}	—	November 19, 2015	Mount Lemmon	Mount Lemmon Survey	·	610 m	MPC · JPL
572719	2008 SZ_{332}	—	September 20, 2008	Kitt Peak	Spacewatch	V	580 m	MPC · JPL
572720	2008 SA_{333}	—	September 23, 2008	Mount Lemmon	Mount Lemmon Survey	·	1.4 km	MPC · JPL
572721	2008 SH_{333}	—	September 24, 2008	Mount Lemmon	Mount Lemmon Survey	·	1.5 km	MPC · JPL
572722	2008 SS_{336}	—	September 24, 2008	Mount Lemmon	Mount Lemmon Survey	·	1.3 km	MPC · JPL
572723	2008 SV_{336}	—	September 24, 2008	Kitt Peak	Spacewatch	·	540 m	MPC · JPL
572724	2008 SQ_{337}	—	September 22, 2008	Kitt Peak	Spacewatch	·	1.4 km	MPC · JPL
572725	2008 SF_{340}	—	September 25, 2008	Kitt Peak	Spacewatch	KOR	1.1 km	MPC · JPL
572726	2008 SK_{340}	—	September 24, 2008	Mount Lemmon	Mount Lemmon Survey	·	640 m	MPC · JPL
572727	2008 SC_{341}	—	September 23, 2008	Kitt Peak	Spacewatch	·	1.9 km	MPC · JPL
572728	2008 SE_{344}	—	September 26, 2008	Kitt Peak	Spacewatch	AGN	1.0 km	MPC · JPL
572729	2008 SK_{345}	—	September 26, 2008	Kitt Peak	Spacewatch	·	1.3 km	MPC · JPL
572730	2008 SN_{345}	—	September 25, 2008	Mount Lemmon	Mount Lemmon Survey	·	640 m	MPC · JPL
572731	2008 SZ_{345}	—	September 24, 2008	Kitt Peak	Spacewatch	KOR	1.1 km	MPC · JPL
572732	2008 TK_{11}	—	September 3, 2008	Kitt Peak	Spacewatch	·	520 m	MPC · JPL
572733	2008 TW_{17}	—	October 1, 2008	Mount Lemmon	Mount Lemmon Survey	·	1.4 km	MPC · JPL
572734	2008 TX_{19}	—	October 1, 2008	Mount Lemmon	Mount Lemmon Survey	·	1.6 km	MPC · JPL
572735	2008 TN_{23}	—	September 4, 2008	Kitt Peak	Spacewatch	BRA	960 m	MPC · JPL
572736	2008 TS_{29}	—	September 19, 2008	Kitt Peak	Spacewatch	·	1.4 km	MPC · JPL
572737	2008 TE_{30}	—	October 1, 2008	Junk Bond	D. Healy	·	2.1 km	MPC · JPL
572738	2008 TL_{43}	—	October 1, 2008	Mount Lemmon	Mount Lemmon Survey	H	370 m	MPC · JPL
572739	2008 TN_{45}	—	October 1, 2008	Mount Lemmon	Mount Lemmon Survey	·	1.5 km	MPC · JPL
572740	2008 TM_{47}	—	November 20, 2003	Kitt Peak	Deep Ecliptic Survey	AGN	840 m	MPC · JPL
572741	2008 TV_{47}	—	October 1, 2008	Kitt Peak	Spacewatch	AGN	1.2 km	MPC · JPL
572742	2008 TC_{49}	—	February 7, 2006	Kitt Peak	Spacewatch	·	2.0 km	MPC · JPL
572743	2008 TT_{49}	—	September 24, 2008	Kitt Peak	Spacewatch	WIT	740 m	MPC · JPL
572744	2008 TO_{53}	—	October 2, 2008	Kitt Peak	Spacewatch	·	1.3 km	MPC · JPL
572745	2008 TT_{68}	—	September 30, 2003	Kitt Peak	Spacewatch	BRA	1.1 km	MPC · JPL
572746	2008 TN_{74}	—	October 2, 2008	Kitt Peak	Spacewatch	·	2.0 km	MPC · JPL
572747	2008 TG_{79}	—	September 24, 2008	Kitt Peak	Spacewatch	·	1.8 km	MPC · JPL
572748	2008 TW_{87}	—	September 25, 2008	Kitt Peak	Spacewatch	·	2.0 km	MPC · JPL
572749	2008 TD_{88}	—	October 3, 2008	Kitt Peak	Spacewatch	·	790 m	MPC · JPL
572750	2008 TB_{91}	—	October 3, 2008	Kitt Peak	Spacewatch	·	1.8 km	MPC · JPL
572751	2008 TM_{96}	—	October 6, 2008	Kitt Peak	Spacewatch	·	1.5 km	MPC · JPL
572752	2008 TV_{97}	—	September 5, 2008	Kitt Peak	Spacewatch	·	470 m	MPC · JPL
572753	2008 TV_{102}	—	October 6, 2008	Kitt Peak	Spacewatch	·	660 m	MPC · JPL
572754	2008 TR_{103}	—	October 6, 2008	Kitt Peak	Spacewatch	·	1.5 km	MPC · JPL
572755	2008 TD_{107}	—	September 29, 2008	Catalina	CSS	·	440 m	MPC · JPL
572756	2008 TA_{110}	—	March 16, 2001	Kitt Peak	Spacewatch	·	2.1 km	MPC · JPL
572757	2008 TM_{118}	—	September 9, 2008	Mount Lemmon	Mount Lemmon Survey	SYL	3.5 km	MPC · JPL
572758	2008 TY_{119}	—	November 3, 2004	Kitt Peak	Spacewatch	·	1.2 km	MPC · JPL
572759	2008 TA_{121}	—	October 7, 2008	Kitt Peak	Spacewatch	·	1.9 km	MPC · JPL
572760	2008 TR_{124}	—	September 2, 2008	Kitt Peak	Spacewatch	·	410 m	MPC · JPL
572761	2008 TX_{130}	—	October 8, 2008	Mount Lemmon	Mount Lemmon Survey	·	1.6 km	MPC · JPL
572762	2008 TE_{132}	—	December 3, 2005	Mauna Kea	A. Boattini	·	1.7 km	MPC · JPL
572763	2008 TW_{134}	—	September 22, 2008	Kitt Peak	Spacewatch	·	790 m	MPC · JPL
572764	2008 TD_{138}	—	October 8, 2008	Mount Lemmon	Mount Lemmon Survey	AGN	940 m	MPC · JPL
572765	2008 TZ_{139}	—	September 23, 2008	Kitt Peak	Spacewatch	·	1.8 km	MPC · JPL
572766	2008 TA_{143}	—	October 9, 2008	Mount Lemmon	Mount Lemmon Survey	·	1.7 km	MPC · JPL
572767	2008 TN_{143}	—	September 23, 2008	Mount Lemmon	Mount Lemmon Survey	·	590 m	MPC · JPL
572768	2008 TQ_{143}	—	October 9, 2008	Mount Lemmon	Mount Lemmon Survey	·	1.6 km	MPC · JPL
572769	2008 TU_{147}	—	September 3, 2008	Kitt Peak	Spacewatch	(12739)	1.7 km	MPC · JPL
572770	2008 TY_{150}	—	September 28, 2008	Mount Lemmon	Mount Lemmon Survey	·	600 m	MPC · JPL
572771	2008 TW_{151}	—	September 3, 2008	Kitt Peak	Spacewatch	·	1.6 km	MPC · JPL
572772	2008 TT_{155}	—	October 9, 2008	Mount Lemmon	Mount Lemmon Survey	·	1.8 km	MPC · JPL
572773	2008 TR_{166}	—	October 7, 2008	Kitt Peak	Spacewatch	·	590 m	MPC · JPL
572774	2008 TE_{167}	—	October 8, 2008	Mount Lemmon	Mount Lemmon Survey	·	1.7 km	MPC · JPL
572775	2008 TJ_{179}	—	October 1, 2008	Catalina	CSS	JUN	1.1 km	MPC · JPL
572776	2008 TF_{185}	—	October 6, 2008	Mount Lemmon	Mount Lemmon Survey	·	1.7 km	MPC · JPL
572777	2008 TB_{191}	—	September 4, 2008	Kitt Peak	Spacewatch	·	1.3 km	MPC · JPL
572778	2008 TT_{192}	—	October 8, 2008	Kitt Peak	Spacewatch	·	1.5 km	MPC · JPL
572779	2008 TX_{193}	—	October 6, 2008	Mount Lemmon	Mount Lemmon Survey	·	1.9 km	MPC · JPL
572780	2008 TC_{194}	—	April 20, 2015	Haleakala	Pan-STARRS 1	·	1.4 km	MPC · JPL
572781	2008 TD_{194}	—	October 9, 2008	Mount Lemmon	Mount Lemmon Survey	·	2.0 km	MPC · JPL
572782	2008 TP_{194}	—	November 28, 2013	Mount Lemmon	Mount Lemmon Survey	WIT	810 m	MPC · JPL
572783	2008 TX_{194}	—	October 2, 2008	Kitt Peak	Spacewatch	·	1.5 km	MPC · JPL
572784	2008 TA_{195}	—	October 7, 2008	Mount Lemmon	Mount Lemmon Survey	·	1.7 km	MPC · JPL
572785	2008 TC_{195}	—	October 2, 2008	Kitt Peak	Spacewatch	AGN	980 m	MPC · JPL
572786	2008 TD_{195}	—	October 10, 2008	Mount Lemmon	Mount Lemmon Survey	·	550 m	MPC · JPL
572787	2008 TG_{195}	—	October 6, 2008	Mount Lemmon	Mount Lemmon Survey	·	1.3 km	MPC · JPL
572788	2008 TO_{195}	—	October 2, 2008	Mount Lemmon	Mount Lemmon Survey	·	1.4 km	MPC · JPL
572789	2008 TP_{195}	—	October 2, 2008	Kitt Peak	Spacewatch	HOF	2.4 km	MPC · JPL
572790	2008 TR_{195}	—	October 10, 2008	Mount Lemmon	Mount Lemmon Survey	·	1.7 km	MPC · JPL
572791	2008 TT_{195}	—	October 9, 2008	Kitt Peak	Spacewatch	·	1.4 km	MPC · JPL
572792	2008 TQ_{196}	—	January 28, 2015	Haleakala	Pan-STARRS 1	·	1.5 km	MPC · JPL
572793	2008 TY_{196}	—	October 8, 2008	Kitt Peak	Spacewatch	·	1.5 km	MPC · JPL
572794	2008 TJ_{197}	—	February 10, 2015	Mount Lemmon	Mount Lemmon Survey	AST	1.3 km	MPC · JPL
572795	2008 TK_{197}	—	October 2, 2008	Kitt Peak	Spacewatch	·	1.6 km	MPC · JPL
572796	2008 TR_{197}	—	October 6, 2004	Kitt Peak	Spacewatch	·	1.5 km	MPC · JPL
572797	2008 TY_{197}	—	January 28, 2015	Haleakala	Pan-STARRS 1	·	1.4 km	MPC · JPL
572798	2008 TD_{198}	—	October 3, 2008	Mount Lemmon	Mount Lemmon Survey	·	1.3 km	MPC · JPL
572799	2008 TA_{199}	—	March 13, 2011	Mount Lemmon	Mount Lemmon Survey	·	1.6 km	MPC · JPL
572800	2008 TL_{199}	—	November 12, 2012	Mount Lemmon	Mount Lemmon Survey	·	800 m	MPC · JPL

== 572801–572900 ==
back to top

Designation			Discovery			Properties		Ref
Permanent	Provisional	Named after	Date	Site	Discoverer(s)	Category	Diam.	Ref
572801	2008 TM_{199}	—	October 7, 2008	Kitt Peak	Spacewatch	MRX	810 m	MPC · JPL
572802	2008 TK_{201}	—	October 2, 2008	Kitt Peak	Spacewatch	·	1.5 km	MPC · JPL
572803	2008 TJ_{202}	—	November 27, 2014	Haleakala	Pan-STARRS 1	EOS	1.4 km	MPC · JPL
572804	2008 TP_{205}	—	October 10, 2008	Mount Lemmon	Mount Lemmon Survey	·	600 m	MPC · JPL
572805	2008 TQ_{205}	—	September 26, 2008	Kitt Peak	Spacewatch	WIT	860 m	MPC · JPL
572806	2008 TQ_{206}	—	October 9, 2008	Mount Lemmon	Mount Lemmon Survey	·	620 m	MPC · JPL
572807	2008 TR_{207}	—	October 6, 2008	Mount Lemmon	Mount Lemmon Survey	·	1.4 km	MPC · JPL
572808	2008 TY_{211}	—	January 28, 2015	Haleakala	Pan-STARRS 1	·	1.4 km	MPC · JPL
572809	2008 TP_{214}	—	October 8, 2008	Mount Lemmon	Mount Lemmon Survey	·	1.5 km	MPC · JPL
572810	2008 TW_{215}	—	October 2, 2008	Mount Lemmon	Mount Lemmon Survey	·	1.7 km	MPC · JPL
572811	2008 TS_{216}	—	October 9, 2008	Mount Lemmon	Mount Lemmon Survey	·	1.8 km	MPC · JPL
572812	2008 TJ_{218}	—	October 6, 2008	Mount Lemmon	Mount Lemmon Survey	·	620 m	MPC · JPL
572813	2008 TE_{219}	—	October 1, 2008	Mount Lemmon	Mount Lemmon Survey	·	2.0 km	MPC · JPL
572814	2008 TF_{219}	—	October 8, 2008	Mount Lemmon	Mount Lemmon Survey	·	1.6 km	MPC · JPL
572815	2008 TD_{221}	—	October 8, 2008	Mount Lemmon	Mount Lemmon Survey	WIT	680 m	MPC · JPL
572816	2008 TF_{222}	—	October 6, 2008	Mount Lemmon	Mount Lemmon Survey	·	1.6 km	MPC · JPL
572817	2008 TG_{223}	—	October 8, 2008	Kitt Peak	Spacewatch	L4	6.9 km	MPC · JPL
572818	2008 TZ_{223}	—	October 1, 2008	Mount Lemmon	Mount Lemmon Survey	L4	6.0 km	MPC · JPL
572819	2008 TT_{226}	—	October 10, 2008	Mount Lemmon	Mount Lemmon Survey	V	530 m	MPC · JPL
572820	2008 TZ_{226}	—	October 8, 2008	Mount Lemmon	Mount Lemmon Survey	EOS	1.3 km	MPC · JPL
572821	2008 TC_{227}	—	October 1, 2008	Kitt Peak	Spacewatch	(2076)	550 m	MPC · JPL
572822	2008 UC	—	October 19, 2008	Siding Spring	SSS	AMO	570 m	MPC · JPL
572823	2008 UZ_{4}	—	October 25, 2008	Kachina	Hobart, J.	·	620 m	MPC · JPL
572824	2008 UA_{5}	—	March 13, 2002	Palomar	NEAT	H	570 m	MPC · JPL
572825	2008 UM_{8}	—	September 19, 2008	Kitt Peak	Spacewatch	·	2.3 km	MPC · JPL
572826	2008 UN_{8}	—	September 19, 2008	Kitt Peak	Spacewatch	L4	6.6 km	MPC · JPL
572827	2008 UC_{13}	—	September 4, 2008	Kitt Peak	Spacewatch	·	1.2 km	MPC · JPL
572828	2008 UE_{15}	—	October 8, 2008	Mount Lemmon	Mount Lemmon Survey	·	1.4 km	MPC · JPL
572829	2008 UU_{16}	—	September 7, 2008	Mount Lemmon	Mount Lemmon Survey	·	1.4 km	MPC · JPL
572830	2008 US_{17}	—	October 2, 2008	Kitt Peak	Spacewatch	·	560 m	MPC · JPL
572831	2008 UP_{27}	—	October 20, 2008	Kitt Peak	Spacewatch	·	1.5 km	MPC · JPL
572832	2008 UW_{29}	—	September 9, 2008	Mount Lemmon	Mount Lemmon Survey	·	1.6 km	MPC · JPL
572833	2008 UZ_{37}	—	October 20, 2008	Kitt Peak	Spacewatch	·	590 m	MPC · JPL
572834	2008 UD_{45}	—	October 20, 2008	Mount Lemmon	Mount Lemmon Survey	·	1.4 km	MPC · JPL
572835	2008 UL_{49}	—	October 20, 2008	Mount Lemmon	Mount Lemmon Survey	·	580 m	MPC · JPL
572836	2008 UP_{62}	—	October 21, 2008	Kitt Peak	Spacewatch	(883)	570 m	MPC · JPL
572837	2008 UG_{63}	—	March 23, 2006	Mount Lemmon	Mount Lemmon Survey	·	2.2 km	MPC · JPL
572838	2008 UC_{66}	—	September 25, 2008	Mount Lemmon	Mount Lemmon Survey	·	1.0 km	MPC · JPL
572839	2008 UQ_{66}	—	September 27, 2003	Kitt Peak	Spacewatch	·	1.9 km	MPC · JPL
572840	2008 UQ_{70}	—	October 21, 2008	Kitt Peak	Spacewatch	·	1.6 km	MPC · JPL
572841	2008 UO_{74}	—	October 21, 2008	Kitt Peak	Spacewatch	·	1.9 km	MPC · JPL
572842	2008 UG_{78}	—	September 27, 2008	Mount Lemmon	Mount Lemmon Survey	·	1.6 km	MPC · JPL
572843	2008 UR_{86}	—	October 2, 2008	Kitt Peak	Spacewatch	·	1.8 km	MPC · JPL
572844	2008 UR_{88}	—	November 12, 2013	Mount Lemmon	Mount Lemmon Survey	·	1.4 km	MPC · JPL
572845	2008 UW_{92}	—	April 15, 2007	Kitt Peak	Spacewatch	·	1.8 km	MPC · JPL
572846	2008 UC_{93}	—	September 29, 2008	Catalina	CSS	·	2.2 km	MPC · JPL
572847	2008 UN_{95}	—	September 22, 2008	Kitt Peak	Spacewatch	·	510 m	MPC · JPL
572848	2008 UX_{96}	—	September 27, 2008	Mount Lemmon	Mount Lemmon Survey	·	1.8 km	MPC · JPL
572849	2008 UX_{104}	—	September 22, 2008	Mount Lemmon	Mount Lemmon Survey	·	1.3 km	MPC · JPL
572850	2008 UD_{112}	—	October 22, 2008	Kitt Peak	Spacewatch	·	740 m	MPC · JPL
572851	2008 UB_{116}	—	March 11, 2003	Palomar	NEAT	·	1.0 km	MPC · JPL
572852	2008 UH_{118}	—	October 22, 2008	Kitt Peak	Spacewatch	·	1.3 km	MPC · JPL
572853	2008 UZ_{124}	—	October 22, 2008	Kitt Peak	Spacewatch	·	2.3 km	MPC · JPL
572854	2008 UG_{132}	—	October 23, 2008	Kitt Peak	Spacewatch	·	1.3 km	MPC · JPL
572855	2008 UJ_{136}	—	October 23, 2008	Kitt Peak	Spacewatch	VER	2.2 km	MPC · JPL
572856	2008 UG_{153}	—	October 23, 2008	Mount Lemmon	Mount Lemmon Survey	·	620 m	MPC · JPL
572857	2008 UK_{155}	—	September 29, 2008	Kitt Peak	Spacewatch	·	880 m	MPC · JPL
572858	2008 UM_{161}	—	September 20, 2008	Mount Lemmon	Mount Lemmon Survey	·	1.9 km	MPC · JPL
572859	2008 UP_{164}	—	October 9, 2008	Kitt Peak	Spacewatch	HOF	2.0 km	MPC · JPL
572860	2008 UH_{165}	—	October 24, 2008	Kitt Peak	Spacewatch	HOF	1.9 km	MPC · JPL
572861	2008 UL_{165}	—	October 7, 2008	Kitt Peak	Spacewatch	·	1.2 km	MPC · JPL
572862	2008 UB_{173}	—	September 22, 2008	Mount Lemmon	Mount Lemmon Survey	·	520 m	MPC · JPL
572863	2008 UX_{176}	—	October 24, 2008	Mount Lemmon	Mount Lemmon Survey	·	630 m	MPC · JPL
572864	2008 UB_{177}	—	October 24, 2008	Mount Lemmon	Mount Lemmon Survey	·	1.5 km	MPC · JPL
572865	2008 UH_{177}	—	October 24, 2008	Mount Lemmon	Mount Lemmon Survey	·	1.8 km	MPC · JPL
572866	2008 UD_{180}	—	October 24, 2008	Kitt Peak	Spacewatch	·	1.8 km	MPC · JPL
572867	2008 UL_{180}	—	October 1, 2003	Kitt Peak	Spacewatch	·	2.4 km	MPC · JPL
572868	2008 UR_{182}	—	October 24, 2008	Mount Lemmon	Mount Lemmon Survey	·	580 m	MPC · JPL
572869	2008 UW_{189}	—	October 9, 2008	Mount Lemmon	Mount Lemmon Survey	·	1.0 km	MPC · JPL
572870	2008 UE_{193}	—	October 1, 2008	Kitt Peak	Spacewatch	·	1.6 km	MPC · JPL
572871	2008 UF_{194}	—	December 4, 2005	Kitt Peak	Spacewatch	·	920 m	MPC · JPL
572872	2008 UE_{195}	—	October 8, 2008	Catalina	CSS	ADE	1.7 km	MPC · JPL
572873	2008 UQ_{195}	—	October 26, 2008	Mount Lemmon	Mount Lemmon Survey	·	1.8 km	MPC · JPL
572874	2008 UF_{196}	—	October 21, 2008	Mount Lemmon	Mount Lemmon Survey	·	2.0 km	MPC · JPL
572875	2008 UG_{196}	—	October 8, 2008	Catalina	CSS	·	600 m	MPC · JPL
572876	2008 UZ_{197}	—	October 27, 2008	Kitt Peak	Spacewatch	·	540 m	MPC · JPL
572877	2008 UJ_{200}	—	September 23, 2008	Kitt Peak	Spacewatch	·	630 m	MPC · JPL
572878	2008 UP_{205}	—	October 20, 2008	Kitt Peak	Spacewatch	·	1.7 km	MPC · JPL
572879	2008 UX_{207}	—	October 9, 2008	Kitt Peak	Spacewatch	·	1.5 km	MPC · JPL
572880	2008 UK_{219}	—	October 25, 2008	Kitt Peak	Spacewatch	·	790 m	MPC · JPL
572881	2008 UL_{219}	—	September 9, 2008	Mount Lemmon	Mount Lemmon Survey	·	700 m	MPC · JPL
572882	2008 UU_{221}	—	October 25, 2008	Kitt Peak	Spacewatch	·	1.9 km	MPC · JPL
572883	2008 UL_{223}	—	October 25, 2008	Kitt Peak	Spacewatch	·	1.5 km	MPC · JPL
572884	2008 UJ_{224}	—	October 25, 2008	Kitt Peak	Spacewatch	·	1.9 km	MPC · JPL
572885	2008 UL_{228}	—	October 25, 2008	Catalina	CSS	·	1.9 km	MPC · JPL
572886	2008 UQ_{229}	—	October 25, 2008	Kitt Peak	Spacewatch	·	580 m	MPC · JPL
572887	2008 UX_{229}	—	October 3, 2003	Kitt Peak	Spacewatch	·	2.3 km	MPC · JPL
572888	2008 US_{231}	—	October 10, 2008	Mount Lemmon	Mount Lemmon Survey	·	1.5 km	MPC · JPL
572889	2008 UW_{232}	—	October 26, 2008	Mount Lemmon	Mount Lemmon Survey	·	1.4 km	MPC · JPL
572890	2008 UD_{237}	—	October 26, 2008	Kitt Peak	Spacewatch	·	1.6 km	MPC · JPL
572891	2008 UX_{245}	—	September 30, 2003	Kitt Peak	Spacewatch	·	1.7 km	MPC · JPL
572892	2008 UH_{249}	—	September 1, 2008	La Sagra	OAM	·	1.2 km	MPC · JPL
572893	2008 UR_{250}	—	October 27, 2008	Kitt Peak	Spacewatch	·	1.8 km	MPC · JPL
572894	2008 UJ_{264}	—	October 28, 2008	Kitt Peak	Spacewatch	·	1.6 km	MPC · JPL
572895	2008 UB_{273}	—	March 24, 2006	Kitt Peak	Spacewatch	·	1.7 km	MPC · JPL
572896	2008 UT_{274}	—	October 24, 2008	Kitt Peak	Spacewatch	·	1.7 km	MPC · JPL
572897	2008 UU_{278}	—	October 1, 2008	Kitt Peak	Spacewatch	·	1.5 km	MPC · JPL
572898	2008 UV_{284}	—	October 28, 2008	Mount Lemmon	Mount Lemmon Survey	·	1.4 km	MPC · JPL
572899	2008 UK_{288}	—	October 28, 2008	Mount Lemmon	Mount Lemmon Survey	·	1.3 km	MPC · JPL
572900	2008 UF_{289}	—	April 30, 2006	Kitt Peak	Spacewatch	·	1.9 km	MPC · JPL

== 572901–573000 ==
back to top

Designation			Discovery			Properties		Ref
Permanent	Provisional	Named after	Date	Site	Discoverer(s)	Category	Diam.	Ref
572901	2008 UO_{294}	—	October 2, 2008	Mount Lemmon	Mount Lemmon Survey	·	2.1 km	MPC · JPL
572902	2008 UL_{296}	—	October 21, 2008	Kitt Peak	Spacewatch	·	2.0 km	MPC · JPL
572903	2008 UA_{298}	—	September 30, 2003	Kitt Peak	Spacewatch	·	2.2 km	MPC · JPL
572904	2008 UZ_{298}	—	October 29, 2008	Kitt Peak	Spacewatch	·	1.4 km	MPC · JPL
572905	2008 UH_{299}	—	September 9, 2008	Mount Lemmon	Mount Lemmon Survey	·	510 m	MPC · JPL
572906	2008 UU_{299}	—	February 25, 2015	Haleakala	Pan-STARRS 1	·	1.7 km	MPC · JPL
572907	2008 UG_{303}	—	October 29, 2008	Kitt Peak	Spacewatch	·	1.5 km	MPC · JPL
572908	2008 UF_{304}	—	October 29, 2008	Kitt Peak	Spacewatch	·	1.7 km	MPC · JPL
572909	2008 UW_{307}	—	October 30, 2008	Kitt Peak	Spacewatch	GEF	1.1 km	MPC · JPL
572910	2008 UR_{309}	—	October 30, 2008	Catalina	CSS	·	1.8 km	MPC · JPL
572911	2008 UA_{311}	—	October 30, 2008	Catalina	CSS	·	1.8 km	MPC · JPL
572912	2008 UC_{311}	—	October 30, 2008	Catalina	CSS	·	750 m	MPC · JPL
572913	2008 UJ_{313}	—	August 25, 2003	Palomar	NEAT	GEF	1.2 km	MPC · JPL
572914	2008 UO_{313}	—	October 24, 2008	Catalina	CSS	·	740 m	MPC · JPL
572915	2008 UZ_{313}	—	October 30, 2008	Mount Lemmon	Mount Lemmon Survey	·	1.5 km	MPC · JPL
572916	2008 UV_{318}	—	October 31, 2008	Mount Lemmon	Mount Lemmon Survey	·	1.6 km	MPC · JPL
572917	2008 UK_{320}	—	July 5, 2003	Kitt Peak	Spacewatch	·	1.7 km	MPC · JPL
572918	2008 US_{320}	—	September 29, 2008	Mount Lemmon	Mount Lemmon Survey	HOF	2.3 km	MPC · JPL
572919	2008 UB_{325}	—	September 29, 2008	Kitt Peak	Spacewatch	WIT	760 m	MPC · JPL
572920	2008 UP_{328}	—	September 24, 2008	Kitt Peak	Spacewatch	NEM	2.2 km	MPC · JPL
572921	2008 UU_{331}	—	October 24, 2008	Mount Lemmon	Mount Lemmon Survey	·	2.1 km	MPC · JPL
572922	2008 UE_{338}	—	October 21, 2008	Mount Lemmon	Mount Lemmon Survey	·	2.8 km	MPC · JPL
572923	2008 UU_{339}	—	October 23, 2008	Kitt Peak	Spacewatch	·	1.8 km	MPC · JPL
572924	2008 UH_{342}	—	October 28, 2008	Kitt Peak	Spacewatch	·	1.5 km	MPC · JPL
572925	2008 UK_{347}	—	March 26, 2006	Mount Lemmon	Mount Lemmon Survey	·	1.5 km	MPC · JPL
572926	2008 UF_{348}	—	October 24, 2008	Kitt Peak	Spacewatch	·	1.4 km	MPC · JPL
572927	2008 UY_{351}	—	October 26, 2008	Catalina	CSS	·	2.8 km	MPC · JPL
572928	2008 US_{352}	—	October 25, 2008	Catalina	CSS	·	1.9 km	MPC · JPL
572929	2008 UW_{363}	—	September 30, 2008	Mount Lemmon	Mount Lemmon Survey	EUN	1.2 km	MPC · JPL
572930	2008 UE_{365}	—	September 24, 2008	Catalina	CSS	·	1.7 km	MPC · JPL
572931	2008 UO_{373}	—	October 9, 2008	Mount Lemmon	Mount Lemmon Survey	·	1.6 km	MPC · JPL
572932	2008 UU_{373}	—	August 21, 2008	Kitt Peak	Spacewatch	L4	10 km	MPC · JPL
572933	2008 UZ_{373}	—	October 31, 2008	Mount Lemmon	Mount Lemmon Survey	·	1.7 km	MPC · JPL
572934	2008 UV_{374}	—	October 22, 2008	Kitt Peak	Spacewatch	·	1.8 km	MPC · JPL
572935	2008 UQ_{375}	—	October 23, 2008	Kitt Peak	Spacewatch	(2076)	650 m	MPC · JPL
572936	2008 UD_{376}	—	July 28, 2011	Haleakala	Pan-STARRS 1	·	690 m	MPC · JPL
572937	2008 UO_{376}	—	October 22, 2008	Kitt Peak	Spacewatch	·	2.1 km	MPC · JPL
572938	2008 UR_{376}	—	October 25, 2008	Mount Lemmon	Mount Lemmon Survey	AGN	950 m	MPC · JPL
572939	2008 US_{376}	—	April 24, 2011	Mount Lemmon	Mount Lemmon Survey	·	1.8 km	MPC · JPL
572940	2008 UZ_{376}	—	October 20, 2008	Kitt Peak	Spacewatch	AST	1.5 km	MPC · JPL
572941	2008 UC_{377}	—	April 14, 2016	Haleakala	Pan-STARRS 1	·	1.7 km	MPC · JPL
572942	2008 UF_{377}	—	October 2, 2013	Kitt Peak	Spacewatch	·	1.6 km	MPC · JPL
572943	2008 UG_{377}	—	August 17, 2012	Haleakala	Pan-STARRS 1	·	1.5 km	MPC · JPL
572944	2008 UU_{377}	—	October 23, 2008	Kitt Peak	Spacewatch	·	2.0 km	MPC · JPL
572945	2008 UW_{377}	—	March 27, 2011	Mount Lemmon	Mount Lemmon Survey	·	1.4 km	MPC · JPL
572946	2008 UK_{378}	—	October 30, 2008	Catalina	CSS	·	660 m	MPC · JPL
572947	2008 UL_{378}	—	April 11, 2016	Haleakala	Pan-STARRS 1	·	1.3 km	MPC · JPL
572948	2008 UT_{378}	—	October 20, 2008	Mount Lemmon	Mount Lemmon Survey	MRX	920 m	MPC · JPL
572949	2008 UY_{378}	—	September 15, 2003	Palomar	NEAT	·	1.7 km	MPC · JPL
572950	2008 UD_{379}	—	October 21, 2008	Mount Lemmon	Mount Lemmon Survey	·	1.4 km	MPC · JPL
572951	2008 UT_{379}	—	October 27, 2008	Mount Lemmon	Mount Lemmon Survey	V	480 m	MPC · JPL
572952	2008 UG_{380}	—	November 9, 2013	Haleakala	Pan-STARRS 1	·	1.3 km	MPC · JPL
572953	2008 UN_{380}	—	October 22, 2008	Kitt Peak	Spacewatch	·	690 m	MPC · JPL
572954	2008 UR_{380}	—	September 20, 2003	Palomar	NEAT	TIR	2.5 km	MPC · JPL
572955	2008 UU_{380}	—	October 27, 2008	Mount Lemmon	Mount Lemmon Survey	AGN	840 m	MPC · JPL
572956	2008 UW_{380}	—	January 31, 1997	Kitt Peak	Spacewatch	·	1.1 km	MPC · JPL
572957	2008 UZ_{380}	—	September 28, 2017	Haleakala	Pan-STARRS 1	·	1.4 km	MPC · JPL
572958	2008 UL_{381}	—	November 14, 2013	Mount Lemmon	Mount Lemmon Survey	·	1.7 km	MPC · JPL
572959	2008 UZ_{381}	—	April 4, 2016	Haleakala	Pan-STARRS 1	·	1.4 km	MPC · JPL
572960	2008 UA_{382}	—	October 30, 2008	Kitt Peak	Spacewatch	EUN	910 m	MPC · JPL
572961	2008 UJ_{382}	—	August 24, 2012	Kitt Peak	Spacewatch	·	1.4 km	MPC · JPL
572962	2008 UR_{382}	—	October 29, 2008	Kitt Peak	Spacewatch	·	1.9 km	MPC · JPL
572963	2008 UH_{384}	—	October 27, 2008	Mount Lemmon	Mount Lemmon Survey	HOF	1.9 km	MPC · JPL
572964	2008 UU_{386}	—	January 10, 2010	Kitt Peak	Spacewatch	PAD	1.6 km	MPC · JPL
572965	2008 UX_{389}	—	October 7, 2008	Mount Lemmon	Mount Lemmon Survey	·	570 m	MPC · JPL
572966	2008 UZ_{392}	—	August 31, 2017	Haleakala	Pan-STARRS 1	·	1.6 km	MPC · JPL
572967	2008 UA_{393}	—	October 29, 2008	Kitt Peak	Spacewatch	·	1.8 km	MPC · JPL
572968	2008 UD_{393}	—	October 27, 2008	Kitt Peak	Spacewatch	·	530 m	MPC · JPL
572969	2008 UO_{394}	—	January 28, 2015	Haleakala	Pan-STARRS 1	·	1.6 km	MPC · JPL
572970	2008 UV_{394}	—	April 11, 2016	Haleakala	Pan-STARRS 1	·	1.4 km	MPC · JPL
572971	2008 UT_{395}	—	October 27, 2008	Mount Lemmon	Mount Lemmon Survey	·	1.8 km	MPC · JPL
572972	2008 UJ_{397}	—	March 24, 2015	Mount Lemmon	Mount Lemmon Survey	·	1.5 km	MPC · JPL
572973	2008 UV_{398}	—	October 21, 2008	Mount Lemmon	Mount Lemmon Survey	·	1.4 km	MPC · JPL
572974	2008 UU_{400}	—	October 28, 2008	Kitt Peak	Spacewatch	HOF	2.1 km	MPC · JPL
572975	2008 US_{401}	—	February 17, 2015	Haleakala	Pan-STARRS 1	·	1.6 km	MPC · JPL
572976	2008 UK_{404}	—	October 26, 2008	Mount Lemmon	Mount Lemmon Survey	·	460 m	MPC · JPL
572977	2008 UQ_{404}	—	October 30, 2008	Kitt Peak	Spacewatch	NEM	2.1 km	MPC · JPL
572978	2008 UK_{406}	—	October 29, 2008	Kitt Peak	Spacewatch	EOS	1.3 km	MPC · JPL
572979	2008 UJ_{407}	—	October 25, 2008	Kitt Peak	Spacewatch	HOF	2.2 km	MPC · JPL
572980	2008 UM_{407}	—	October 28, 2008	Mount Lemmon	Mount Lemmon Survey	AST	1.2 km	MPC · JPL
572981	2008 UZ_{409}	—	October 28, 2008	Kitt Peak	Spacewatch	·	540 m	MPC · JPL
572982	2008 UF_{410}	—	October 23, 2008	Mount Lemmon	Mount Lemmon Survey	·	1.8 km	MPC · JPL
572983	2008 UJ_{412}	—	October 30, 2008	Kitt Peak	Spacewatch	·	870 m	MPC · JPL
572984	2008 UX_{412}	—	October 24, 2008	Mount Lemmon	Mount Lemmon Survey	·	1.6 km	MPC · JPL
572985	2008 VT_{6}	—	November 1, 2008	Mount Lemmon	Mount Lemmon Survey	HOF	2.2 km	MPC · JPL
572986	2008 VW_{14}	—	November 9, 2008	Andrushivka	Y. Ivaščenko, Ostafijchuk, P.	H	600 m	MPC · JPL
572987	2008 VR_{16}	—	October 1, 2008	Mount Lemmon	Mount Lemmon Survey	·	1.5 km	MPC · JPL
572988	2008 VR_{17}	—	April 2, 2006	Kitt Peak	Spacewatch	AST	1.6 km	MPC · JPL
572989	2008 VY_{18}	—	September 13, 1994	Kitt Peak	Spacewatch	NEM	1.7 km	MPC · JPL
572990	2008 VG_{19}	—	November 1, 2008	Kitt Peak	Spacewatch	·	2.0 km	MPC · JPL
572991	2008 VU_{22}	—	November 1, 2008	Mount Lemmon	Mount Lemmon Survey	·	610 m	MPC · JPL
572992	2008 VS_{26}	—	October 21, 2008	Kitt Peak	Spacewatch	·	1.7 km	MPC · JPL
572993	2008 VC_{29}	—	September 29, 2008	Mount Lemmon	Mount Lemmon Survey	·	2.1 km	MPC · JPL
572994	2008 VF_{29}	—	November 2, 2008	Kitt Peak	Spacewatch	HOF	2.0 km	MPC · JPL
572995	2008 VV_{29}	—	November 2, 2008	Mount Lemmon	Mount Lemmon Survey	·	3.8 km	MPC · JPL
572996	2008 VF_{30}	—	September 21, 2003	Kitt Peak	Spacewatch	·	1.9 km	MPC · JPL
572997	2008 VY_{31}	—	September 27, 2008	Mount Lemmon	Mount Lemmon Survey	·	1.3 km	MPC · JPL
572998	2008 VW_{32}	—	November 2, 2008	Mount Lemmon	Mount Lemmon Survey	·	610 m	MPC · JPL
572999	2008 VK_{33}	—	November 2, 2008	Mount Lemmon	Mount Lemmon Survey	NEM	2.1 km	MPC · JPL
573000	2008 VZ_{36}	—	April 24, 2001	Haleakala	NEAT	·	2.7 km	MPC · JPL

back to top

== Meaning of names ==
As minor planet discoveries are confirmed, they are given a permanent number by the IAU's Minor Planet Center (MPC), and the discoverers can then submit names for them, following the IAU's naming conventions. The list below concerns those minor planets in the specified number-range that have received names, and explains the meanings of those names.

Official naming citations of newly named small Solar System bodies are approved and published in a bulletin by IAU's Working Group for Small Bodies Nomenclature (WGSBN). Before May 2021, citations were published in MPC's Minor Planet Circulars for many decades. Recent citations can also be found on the JPL Small-Body Database (SBDB). Until his death in 2016, German astronomer Lutz D. Schmadel compiled these citations into the Dictionary of Minor Planet Names (DMP) and regularly updated the collection.

Based on Paul Herget's The Names of the Minor Planets, Schmadel also researched the unclear origin of numerous asteroids, most of which had been named prior to World War II. This article incorporates text from this source, which is in the public domain: SBDB New namings may only be added to this list below after official publication as the preannouncement of names is condemned. The WGSBN publishes a comprehensive guideline for the naming rules of non-cometary small Solar System bodies.

Named minor planet	Provisional	This minor planet was named for...	Ref · Catalog
572217 Dramba		Constantin Dramba (1907–1977) was a Romanian astronomer	IAU · 572217
