= List of minor planets: 507001–508000 =

The following is a partial list of minor planets, running from minor-planet number 507001 through 508000, inclusive. The primary data for this and other partial lists is based on JPL's "Small-Body Orbital Elements" and data available from the Minor Planet Center. Critical list information is also provided by the MPC, unless otherwise specified from Lowell Observatory. A detailed description of the table's columns and additional sources are given on the main page including a complete list of every page in this series, and a statistical break-up on the dynamical classification of minor planets.

Also see the summary list of all named bodies in numerical and alphabetical order, and the corresponding naming citations for the number range of this particular list. New namings may only be added to this list after official publication, as the preannouncement of names is condemned by the Working Group for Small Bodies Nomenclature of the International Astronomical Union.

Near-Earth obj.	MBA (inner)	MBA (outer)	Centaur
Mars-crosser	MBA (middle)	Jupiter trojan	Trans-Neptunian obj.
Unclassified

== 507001–507100 ==
Designation			Discovery			Properties		Ref
Permanent	Provisional	Named after	Date	Site	Discoverer(s)	Category	Diam.	Ref
507001	2008 TF_{46}	—	October 1, 2008	Kitt Peak	Spacewatch	·	1.4 km	MPC · JPL
507002	2008 TA_{63}	—	October 2, 2008	Kitt Peak	Spacewatch	·	1.5 km	MPC · JPL
507003	2008 TV_{77}	—	September 2, 2008	Kitt Peak	Spacewatch	·	1.2 km	MPC · JPL
507004	2008 TC_{82}	—	September 6, 2008	Kitt Peak	Spacewatch	MIS	2.1 km	MPC · JPL
507005	2008 TR_{93}	—	October 8, 2008	Catalina	CSS	·	1.5 km	MPC · JPL
507006	2008 TC_{101}	—	October 6, 2008	Kitt Peak	Spacewatch	(12739)	1.3 km	MPC · JPL
507007	2008 TP_{101}	—	October 6, 2008	Kitt Peak	Spacewatch	·	1.2 km	MPC · JPL
507008	2008 TT_{142}	—	October 9, 2008	Mount Lemmon	Mount Lemmon Survey	·	1.3 km	MPC · JPL
507009	2008 TO_{157}	—	September 6, 2008	Siding Spring	SSS	·	1.9 km	MPC · JPL
507010	2008 TT_{162}	—	October 1, 2008	Mount Lemmon	Mount Lemmon Survey	·	1.4 km	MPC · JPL
507011	2008 TH_{163}	—	October 1, 2008	Catalina	CSS	·	2.2 km	MPC · JPL
507012	2008 TY_{164}	—	October 2, 2008	Kitt Peak	Spacewatch	·	1.5 km	MPC · JPL
507013	2008 TP_{165}	—	October 3, 2008	Kitt Peak	Spacewatch	T_{j} (2.91)	4.6 km	MPC · JPL
507014	2008 TB_{168}	—	October 1, 2008	Kitt Peak	Spacewatch	·	1.4 km	MPC · JPL
507015	2008 TW_{172}	—	October 10, 2008	Mount Lemmon	Mount Lemmon Survey	HNS	1.2 km	MPC · JPL
507016	2008 TU_{180}	—	September 8, 2008	Catalina	CSS	JUN	1.2 km	MPC · JPL
507017	2008 UY_{13}	—	September 25, 2008	Kitt Peak	Spacewatch	AGN	1.1 km	MPC · JPL
507018	2008 UL_{38}	—	October 20, 2008	Kitt Peak	Spacewatch	·	1.7 km	MPC · JPL
507019	2008 UQ_{51}	—	October 20, 2008	Kitt Peak	Spacewatch	·	1.6 km	MPC · JPL
507020	2008 UU_{58}	—	October 7, 1999	Kitt Peak	Spacewatch	·	1.4 km	MPC · JPL
507021	2008 UU_{72}	—	October 21, 2008	Mount Lemmon	Mount Lemmon Survey	·	1.8 km	MPC · JPL
507022	2008 UM_{73}	—	October 21, 2008	Kitt Peak	Spacewatch	·	2.0 km	MPC · JPL
507023	2008 UD_{74}	—	October 21, 2008	Kitt Peak	Spacewatch	·	1.7 km	MPC · JPL
507024	2008 UD_{77}	—	October 21, 2008	Mount Lemmon	Mount Lemmon Survey	HNS	1.1 km	MPC · JPL
507025	2008 UK_{85}	—	October 9, 2008	Kitt Peak	Spacewatch	·	1.4 km	MPC · JPL
507026	2008 UO_{85}	—	September 9, 2008	Mount Lemmon	Mount Lemmon Survey	·	1.2 km	MPC · JPL
507027	2008 UM_{97}	—	October 25, 2008	Socorro	LINEAR	·	2.4 km	MPC · JPL
507028	2008 UU_{101}	—	September 23, 2008	Kitt Peak	Spacewatch	·	1.3 km	MPC · JPL
507029	2008 UL_{102}	—	October 20, 2008	Kitt Peak	Spacewatch	·	1.2 km	MPC · JPL
507030	2008 UW_{116}	—	October 22, 2008	Kitt Peak	Spacewatch	·	1.5 km	MPC · JPL
507031	2008 UD_{128}	—	October 22, 2008	Kitt Peak	Spacewatch	·	1.5 km	MPC · JPL
507032	2008 UW_{133}	—	October 23, 2008	Kitt Peak	Spacewatch	·	930 m	MPC · JPL
507033	2008 UC_{137}	—	October 23, 2008	Kitt Peak	Spacewatch	·	1.6 km	MPC · JPL
507034	2008 UW_{137}	—	October 23, 2008	Kitt Peak	Spacewatch	·	1.8 km	MPC · JPL
507035	2008 US_{149}	—	October 2, 2008	Kitt Peak	Spacewatch	·	1.4 km	MPC · JPL
507036	2008 UR_{157}	—	October 23, 2008	Mount Lemmon	Mount Lemmon Survey	·	1.6 km	MPC · JPL
507037	2008 UJ_{163}	—	October 24, 2008	Kitt Peak	Spacewatch	·	1.7 km	MPC · JPL
507038	2008 UR_{177}	—	September 22, 2008	Kitt Peak	Spacewatch	·	1.5 km	MPC · JPL
507039	2008 US_{196}	—	September 24, 2008	Mount Lemmon	Mount Lemmon Survey	·	1.3 km	MPC · JPL
507040	2008 UP_{209}	—	September 23, 2008	Mount Lemmon	Mount Lemmon Survey	·	1.5 km	MPC · JPL
507041	2008 UV_{224}	—	October 25, 2008	Kitt Peak	Spacewatch	·	1.6 km	MPC · JPL
507042	2008 US_{226}	—	October 25, 2008	Kitt Peak	Spacewatch	·	2.1 km	MPC · JPL
507043	2008 UR_{245}	—	October 26, 2008	Kitt Peak	Spacewatch	·	1.7 km	MPC · JPL
507044	2008 UU_{255}	—	October 27, 2008	Kitt Peak	Spacewatch	·	1.4 km	MPC · JPL
507045	2008 UU_{256}	—	October 23, 2008	Kitt Peak	Spacewatch	·	1.8 km	MPC · JPL
507046	2008 UA_{292}	—	October 29, 2008	Kitt Peak	Spacewatch	GEF	780 m	MPC · JPL
507047	2008 UP_{292}	—	October 2, 2008	Kitt Peak	Spacewatch	·	1.2 km	MPC · JPL
507048	2008 UA_{300}	—	October 29, 2008	Kitt Peak	Spacewatch	·	1.7 km	MPC · JPL
507049	2008 UK_{307}	—	October 8, 2008	Catalina	CSS	·	1.6 km	MPC · JPL
507050	2008 UU_{314}	—	October 30, 2008	Mount Lemmon	Mount Lemmon Survey	·	1.5 km	MPC · JPL
507051	2008 UJ_{336}	—	October 21, 2008	Kitt Peak	Spacewatch	·	1.4 km	MPC · JPL
507052	2008 UM_{358}	—	October 26, 2008	Mount Lemmon	Mount Lemmon Survey	AEO	800 m	MPC · JPL
507053	2008 UM_{359}	—	October 27, 2008	Siding Spring	SSS	·	2.2 km	MPC · JPL
507054	2008 VV_{32}	—	October 6, 2008	Mount Lemmon	Mount Lemmon Survey	·	1.5 km	MPC · JPL
507055	2008 VE_{34}	—	October 6, 2008	Mount Lemmon	Mount Lemmon Survey	WIT	920 m	MPC · JPL
507056	2008 VR_{41}	—	October 31, 2008	Catalina	CSS	·	1.8 km	MPC · JPL
507057	2008 VN_{43}	—	November 3, 2008	Kitt Peak	Spacewatch	·	1.7 km	MPC · JPL
507058	2008 VY_{61}	—	October 27, 2008	Kitt Peak	Spacewatch	·	1.5 km	MPC · JPL
507059	2008 VD_{70}	—	November 6, 2008	Kitt Peak	Spacewatch	·	1.6 km	MPC · JPL
507060	2008 WC_{16}	—	September 7, 2008	Mount Lemmon	Mount Lemmon Survey	·	1.5 km	MPC · JPL
507061	2008 WJ_{17}	—	October 24, 2008	Mount Lemmon	Mount Lemmon Survey	·	1.3 km	MPC · JPL
507062	2008 WY_{34}	—	November 17, 2008	Kitt Peak	Spacewatch	·	1.4 km	MPC · JPL
507063	2008 WW_{39}	—	November 7, 2008	Mount Lemmon	Mount Lemmon Survey	·	1.8 km	MPC · JPL
507064	2008 WD_{78}	—	November 20, 2008	Kitt Peak	Spacewatch	·	1.4 km	MPC · JPL
507065	2008 WN_{92}	—	October 24, 2008	Kitt Peak	Spacewatch	·	1.5 km	MPC · JPL
507066	2008 WN_{101}	—	November 27, 2008	Črni Vrh	J. Vales, B. Mikuž	(1547)	1.6 km	MPC · JPL
507067	2008 WL_{107}	—	October 23, 2008	Kitt Peak	Spacewatch	MRX	870 m	MPC · JPL
507068	2008 WB_{115}	—	October 30, 2008	Kitt Peak	Spacewatch	AEO	1.0 km	MPC · JPL
507069	2008 WD_{122}	—	October 23, 2008	Kitt Peak	Spacewatch	·	1.5 km	MPC · JPL
507070	2008 XH_{18}	—	December 1, 2008	Kitt Peak	Spacewatch	·	1.4 km	MPC · JPL
507071	2008 XC_{26}	—	October 25, 2008	Kitt Peak	Spacewatch	·	1.5 km	MPC · JPL
507072	2008 XW_{37}	—	November 20, 2008	Kitt Peak	Spacewatch	·	1.4 km	MPC · JPL
507073	2008 XZ_{52}	—	December 4, 2008	Mount Lemmon	Mount Lemmon Survey	·	1.4 km	MPC · JPL
507074	2008 YU_{43}	—	November 7, 2008	Mount Lemmon	Mount Lemmon Survey	·	1.5 km	MPC · JPL
507075	2008 YH_{101}	—	December 29, 2008	Kitt Peak	Spacewatch	·	1.6 km	MPC · JPL
507076	2008 YO_{109}	—	November 19, 2008	Kitt Peak	Spacewatch	·	1.4 km	MPC · JPL
507077	2008 YX_{174}	—	September 9, 2007	Mount Lemmon	Mount Lemmon Survey	KOR	1.2 km	MPC · JPL
507078	2009 AB_{15}	—	December 21, 2008	Kitt Peak	Spacewatch	·	610 m	MPC · JPL
507079	2009 AQ_{39}	—	December 22, 2008	Mount Lemmon	Mount Lemmon Survey	(13314)	1.6 km	MPC · JPL
507080	2009 BE_{13}	—	October 17, 2008	Kitt Peak	Spacewatch	·	2.1 km	MPC · JPL
507081	2009 BY_{19}	—	January 2, 2009	Mount Lemmon	Mount Lemmon Survey	KOR	1.0 km	MPC · JPL
507082	2009 BS_{142}	—	January 16, 2009	Kitt Peak	Spacewatch	·	510 m	MPC · JPL
507083	2009 BZ_{161}	—	January 18, 2009	Kitt Peak	Spacewatch	·	2.7 km	MPC · JPL
507084	2009 BN_{173}	—	January 20, 2009	Catalina	CSS	·	1.4 km	MPC · JPL
507085	2009 CZ_{25}	—	December 31, 2008	Mount Lemmon	Mount Lemmon Survey	BRA	1.2 km	MPC · JPL
507086	2009 DV_{84}	—	February 22, 2009	Kitt Peak	Spacewatch	·	2.3 km	MPC · JPL
507087	2009 DY_{104}	—	February 26, 2009	Kitt Peak	Spacewatch	·	590 m	MPC · JPL
507088	2009 DA_{106}	—	February 26, 2009	Kitt Peak	Spacewatch	·	630 m	MPC · JPL
507089	2009 DV_{142}	—	December 5, 2008	Kitt Peak	Spacewatch	·	2.1 km	MPC · JPL
507090	2009 EK_{2}	—	February 20, 2009	Catalina	CSS	·	2.1 km	MPC · JPL
507091	2009 ES_{13}	—	March 15, 2009	Kitt Peak	Spacewatch	·	1.8 km	MPC · JPL
507092	2009 FT_{8}	—	February 28, 2009	Kitt Peak	Spacewatch	·	770 m	MPC · JPL
507093	2009 FM_{10}	—	March 18, 2009	Mount Lemmon	Mount Lemmon Survey	KOR	1.0 km	MPC · JPL
507094	2009 FP_{17}	—	March 22, 2009	Mount Lemmon	Mount Lemmon Survey	·	2.7 km	MPC · JPL
507095	2009 FV_{35}	—	March 1, 2009	Kitt Peak	Spacewatch	·	640 m	MPC · JPL
507096	2009 FT_{57}	—	March 31, 2009	Mount Lemmon	Mount Lemmon Survey	·	660 m	MPC · JPL
507097	2009 FW_{72}	—	March 19, 2009	Kitt Peak	Spacewatch	·	2.0 km	MPC · JPL
507098	2009 FF_{77}	—	March 19, 2009	Kitt Peak	Spacewatch	·	680 m	MPC · JPL
507099	2009 HQ_{26}	—	December 17, 2007	Kitt Peak	Spacewatch	·	2.1 km	MPC · JPL
507100	2009 HM_{44}	—	April 20, 2009	Purple Mountain	PMO NEO Survey Program	·	3.1 km	MPC · JPL

== 507101–507200 ==
back to top

Designation			Discovery			Properties		Ref
Permanent	Provisional	Named after	Date	Site	Discoverer(s)	Category	Diam.	Ref
507101	2009 HO_{60}	—	April 19, 2009	Kitt Peak	Spacewatch	·	660 m	MPC · JPL
507102	2009 HN_{93}	—	April 30, 2009	Kitt Peak	Spacewatch	·	1.9 km	MPC · JPL
507103	2009 HG_{100}	—	April 19, 2009	Kitt Peak	Spacewatch	·	1.5 km	MPC · JPL
507104	2009 JX_{5}	—	May 13, 2009	Kitt Peak	Spacewatch	·	720 m	MPC · JPL
507105	2009 JU_{16}	—	April 19, 2009	Kitt Peak	Spacewatch	·	2.9 km	MPC · JPL
507106	2009 KK_{5}	—	May 24, 2009	Kitt Peak	Spacewatch	·	2.4 km	MPC · JPL
507107	2009 KC_{8}	—	May 27, 2009	La Sagra	OAM	·	750 m	MPC · JPL
507108	2009 LG_{1}	—	June 12, 2009	Kitt Peak	Spacewatch	·	690 m	MPC · JPL
507109	2009 OO_{13}	—	July 27, 2009	Kitt Peak	Spacewatch	PHO	840 m	MPC · JPL
507110	2009 PD_{4}	—	July 29, 2009	Kitt Peak	Spacewatch	·	880 m	MPC · JPL
507111	2009 PE_{8}	—	August 15, 2009	Catalina	CSS	·	1.2 km	MPC · JPL
507112	2009 SN_{5}	—	September 16, 2009	Mount Lemmon	Mount Lemmon Survey	·	1.3 km	MPC · JPL
507113	2009 SR_{41}	—	March 29, 2000	Kitt Peak	Spacewatch	·	1.2 km	MPC · JPL
507114	2009 SY_{47}	—	September 16, 2009	Kitt Peak	Spacewatch	·	990 m	MPC · JPL
507115	2009 SL_{68}	—	September 17, 2009	Mount Lemmon	Mount Lemmon Survey	·	960 m	MPC · JPL
507116	2009 SY_{110}	—	July 29, 2009	Kitt Peak	Spacewatch	·	660 m	MPC · JPL
507117	2009 SP_{128}	—	September 18, 2009	Kitt Peak	Spacewatch	·	990 m	MPC · JPL
507118	2009 SH_{136}	—	September 18, 2009	Kitt Peak	Spacewatch	H	400 m	MPC · JPL
507119	2009 SR_{143}	—	September 19, 2009	Kitt Peak	Spacewatch	T_{j} (2.8) · unusual	3.4 km	MPC · JPL
507120	2009 SC_{262}	—	September 15, 2009	Kitt Peak	Spacewatch	·	1.4 km	MPC · JPL
507121	2009 SR_{307}	—	September 17, 2009	Kitt Peak	Spacewatch	·	1.1 km	MPC · JPL
507122	2009 SF_{313}	—	September 18, 2009	Kitt Peak	Spacewatch	T_{j} (2.99) · 3:2	3.9 km	MPC · JPL
507123	2009 SQ_{349}	—	September 25, 2009	Kitt Peak	Spacewatch	·	750 m	MPC · JPL
507124	2009 SG_{370}	—	October 28, 2005	Catalina	CSS	MAR	890 m	MPC · JPL
507125	2009 UQ_{8}	—	October 16, 2009	Mount Lemmon	Mount Lemmon Survey	·	900 m	MPC · JPL
507126	2009 UM_{15}	—	October 16, 2009	Mount Lemmon	Mount Lemmon Survey	·	700 m	MPC · JPL
507127	2009 US_{26}	—	October 21, 2009	Catalina	CSS	·	1.2 km	MPC · JPL
507128	2009 UF_{27}	—	October 21, 2009	Catalina	CSS	H	550 m	MPC · JPL
507129	2009 UT_{72}	—	October 14, 2009	Mount Lemmon	Mount Lemmon Survey	·	1.7 km	MPC · JPL
507130	2009 UH_{109}	—	October 23, 2009	Mount Lemmon	Mount Lemmon Survey	·	820 m	MPC · JPL
507131	2009 UH_{153}	—	October 27, 2009	Mount Lemmon	Mount Lemmon Survey	·	2.2 km	MPC · JPL
507132	2009 UG_{159}	—	October 25, 2005	Mount Lemmon	Mount Lemmon Survey	·	730 m	MPC · JPL
507133	2009 VY_{10}	—	November 8, 2009	Mount Lemmon	Mount Lemmon Survey	3:2	3.9 km	MPC · JPL
507134	2009 VS_{23}	—	November 9, 2009	Mount Lemmon	Mount Lemmon Survey	EUN	1.4 km	MPC · JPL
507135	2009 VB_{67}	—	November 9, 2009	Kitt Peak	Spacewatch	·	560 m	MPC · JPL
507136	2009 VW_{71}	—	November 11, 2009	Kitt Peak	Spacewatch	·	2.1 km	MPC · JPL
507137	2009 VM_{89}	—	November 11, 2009	Kitt Peak	Spacewatch	·	1.9 km	MPC · JPL
507138	2009 VB_{97}	—	December 21, 2005	Kitt Peak	Spacewatch	·	840 m	MPC · JPL
507139	2009 WS_{3}	—	November 16, 2009	Mount Lemmon	Mount Lemmon Survey	·	830 m	MPC · JPL
507140	2009 WB_{6}	—	November 16, 2009	La Sagra	OAM	H	620 m	MPC · JPL
507141	2009 WV_{26}	—	September 19, 2009	Mount Lemmon	Mount Lemmon Survey	·	1.1 km	MPC · JPL
507142	2009 WC_{73}	—	November 9, 2009	Mount Lemmon	Mount Lemmon Survey	(5)	850 m	MPC · JPL
507143	2009 WX_{102}	—	November 22, 2009	Kitt Peak	Spacewatch	·	1.3 km	MPC · JPL
507144	2009 WC_{119}	—	November 20, 2009	Kitt Peak	Spacewatch	·	1.0 km	MPC · JPL
507145	2009 WQ_{165}	—	November 21, 2009	Kitt Peak	Spacewatch	·	920 m	MPC · JPL
507146	2009 WV_{179}	—	October 25, 2009	Kitt Peak	Spacewatch	·	970 m	MPC · JPL
507147	2009 WL_{205}	—	November 17, 2009	Kitt Peak	Spacewatch	3:2	3.7 km	MPC · JPL
507148	2009 WY_{224}	—	November 16, 2009	Mount Lemmon	Mount Lemmon Survey	H	720 m	MPC · JPL
507149	2009 WL_{242}	—	November 11, 2009	Kitt Peak	Spacewatch	·	920 m	MPC · JPL
507150	2009 WB_{248}	—	November 17, 2009	Kitt Peak	Spacewatch	·	1.2 km	MPC · JPL
507151	2009 WL_{263}	—	November 19, 2009	Kitt Peak	Spacewatch	·	810 m	MPC · JPL
507152	2009 XY_{1}	—	December 10, 2009	La Sagra	OAM	·	1.8 km	MPC · JPL
507153	2009 XX_{8}	—	December 29, 2005	Mount Lemmon	Mount Lemmon Survey	·	800 m	MPC · JPL
507154	2009 XO_{11}	—	November 11, 2009	Mount Lemmon	Mount Lemmon Survey	MAR	1.3 km	MPC · JPL
507155	2009 XY_{17}	—	December 15, 2009	Mount Lemmon	Mount Lemmon Survey	·	1.4 km	MPC · JPL
507156	2009 YE	—	December 17, 2009	Catalina	CSS	·	3.1 km	MPC · JPL
507157	2009 YD_{5}	—	December 17, 2009	Mount Lemmon	Mount Lemmon Survey	·	1 km	MPC · JPL
507158	2009 YX_{13}	—	December 18, 2009	Mount Lemmon	Mount Lemmon Survey	·	2.7 km	MPC · JPL
507159	2010 AQ_{8}	—	December 19, 2009	Kitt Peak	Spacewatch	H	680 m	MPC · JPL
507160	2010 AT_{32}	—	February 1, 2006	Kitt Peak	Spacewatch	·	970 m	MPC · JPL
507161	2010 AK_{38}	—	January 7, 2010	Kitt Peak	Spacewatch	H	520 m	MPC · JPL
507162	2010 AF_{41}	—	January 6, 2010	Kitt Peak	Spacewatch	·	1.2 km	MPC · JPL
507163	2010 AE_{56}	—	December 20, 2009	Mount Lemmon	Mount Lemmon Survey	·	1.4 km	MPC · JPL
507164	2010 BE_{33}	—	January 18, 2010	WISE	WISE	BAR	1.1 km	MPC · JPL
507165	2010 BO_{55}	—	December 3, 2008	Mount Lemmon	Mount Lemmon Survey	·	3.9 km	MPC · JPL
507166	2010 CZ_{2}	—	February 5, 2010	Kitt Peak	Spacewatch	·	2.0 km	MPC · JPL
507167	2010 CN_{70}	—	September 29, 2008	Catalina	CSS	·	3.4 km	MPC · JPL
507168	2010 CQ_{170}	—	February 13, 2010	Mount Lemmon	Mount Lemmon Survey	·	1.4 km	MPC · JPL
507169	2010 CR_{173}	—	September 8, 2008	Catalina	CSS	·	2.0 km	MPC · JPL
507170	2010 CV_{184}	—	February 12, 2010	Socorro	LINEAR	·	1.8 km	MPC · JPL
507171	2010 DP_{80}	—	May 16, 2010	Kitt Peak	Spacewatch	EMA	3.4 km	MPC · JPL
507172	2010 EM_{30}	—	October 1, 2008	Mount Lemmon	Mount Lemmon Survey	·	2.1 km	MPC · JPL
507173	2010 EK_{132}	—	February 18, 2010	Mount Lemmon	Mount Lemmon Survey	·	1.8 km	MPC · JPL
507174	2010 ED_{173}	—	April 8, 2006	Kitt Peak	Spacewatch	·	2.6 km	MPC · JPL
507175	2010 GB_{149}	—	January 26, 2006	Kitt Peak	Spacewatch	·	2.0 km	MPC · JPL
507176	2010 GJ_{161}	—	April 7, 2010	Catalina	CSS	·	1.0 km	MPC · JPL
507177	2010 GF_{172}	—	March 20, 2010	Catalina	CSS	·	1.7 km	MPC · JPL
507178	2010 HO_{22}	—	April 24, 2010	WISE	WISE	L5	10 km	MPC · JPL
507179	2010 JB_{7}	—	February 13, 2010	Catalina	CSS	ADE	2.3 km	MPC · JPL
507180	2010 JT_{77}	—	May 6, 2010	Mount Lemmon	Mount Lemmon Survey	·	3.0 km	MPC · JPL
507181	2010 JK_{86}	—	May 11, 2010	WISE	WISE	·	4.1 km	MPC · JPL
507182	2010 JN_{137}	—	November 27, 2009	Mount Lemmon	Mount Lemmon Survey	ADE	2.6 km	MPC · JPL
507183	2010 MA_{2}	—	June 22, 2010	Mount Lemmon	Mount Lemmon Survey	PHO	840 m	MPC · JPL
507184	2010 NC_{4}	—	July 4, 2010	Kitt Peak	Spacewatch	·	620 m	MPC · JPL
507185	2010 PT_{43}	—	August 6, 2010	WISE	WISE	ULA · CYB	4.0 km	MPC · JPL
507186	2010 PC_{53}	—	August 8, 2010	WISE	WISE	PHO	1.9 km	MPC · JPL
507187	2010 RA_{48}	—	January 10, 2008	Mount Lemmon	Mount Lemmon Survey	·	480 m	MPC · JPL
507188	2010 RM_{50}	—	September 4, 2010	Kitt Peak	Spacewatch	·	810 m	MPC · JPL
507189	2010 RC_{78}	—	September 11, 2010	La Sagra	OAM	·	710 m	MPC · JPL
507190	2010 RN_{112}	—	September 20, 2003	Kitt Peak	Spacewatch	·	540 m	MPC · JPL
507191	2010 RG_{139}	—	September 25, 2000	Kitt Peak	Spacewatch	·	570 m	MPC · JPL
507192	2010 RN_{146}	—	September 16, 2003	Kitt Peak	Spacewatch	·	470 m	MPC · JPL
507193	2010 RF_{154}	—	September 6, 2010	Kitt Peak	Spacewatch	·	870 m	MPC · JPL
507194	2010 RT_{173}	—	September 6, 2010	Kitt Peak	Spacewatch	·	770 m	MPC · JPL
507195	2010 SD_{21}	—	September 17, 2010	Kitt Peak	Spacewatch	·	670 m	MPC · JPL
507196	2010 TN_{17}	—	September 10, 2010	Kitt Peak	Spacewatch	·	570 m	MPC · JPL
507197	2010 TZ_{20}	—	September 18, 2010	Kitt Peak	Spacewatch	·	920 m	MPC · JPL
507198	2010 TN_{21}	—	September 20, 2003	Kitt Peak	Spacewatch	·	390 m	MPC · JPL
507199	2010 TO_{23}	—	October 1, 2010	Kitt Peak	Spacewatch	·	540 m	MPC · JPL
507200	2010 TX_{23}	—	October 1, 2010	Kitt Peak	Spacewatch	·	610 m	MPC · JPL

== 507201–507300 ==
back to top

Designation			Discovery			Properties		Ref
Permanent	Provisional	Named after	Date	Site	Discoverer(s)	Category	Diam.	Ref
507201	2010 TH_{90}	—	October 9, 2010	Mount Lemmon	Mount Lemmon Survey	·	580 m	MPC · JPL
507202	2010 TB_{122}	—	November 2, 2000	Kitt Peak	Spacewatch	·	710 m	MPC · JPL
507203	2010 TB_{124}	—	September 17, 2010	Kitt Peak	Spacewatch	·	600 m	MPC · JPL
507204	2010 TH_{130}	—	September 18, 2003	Kitt Peak	Spacewatch	V	500 m	MPC · JPL
507205	2010 UE_{31}	—	October 17, 2010	Mount Lemmon	Mount Lemmon Survey	·	600 m	MPC · JPL
507206	2010 UP_{34}	—	October 13, 2010	Mount Lemmon	Mount Lemmon Survey	·	620 m	MPC · JPL
507207	2010 UQ_{45}	—	October 13, 2010	Mount Lemmon	Mount Lemmon Survey	V	520 m	MPC · JPL
507208	2010 UR_{47}	—	October 13, 2010	Catalina	CSS	·	810 m	MPC · JPL
507209	2010 UG_{49}	—	October 12, 2010	Mount Lemmon	Mount Lemmon Survey	SYL · CYB	4.2 km	MPC · JPL
507210	2010 UA_{50}	—	December 4, 2007	Mount Lemmon	Mount Lemmon Survey	·	880 m	MPC · JPL
507211	2010 UL_{58}	—	October 29, 2010	Kitt Peak	Spacewatch	·	680 m	MPC · JPL
507212	2010 VP_{31}	—	November 3, 2010	Mount Lemmon	Mount Lemmon Survey	·	780 m	MPC · JPL
507213	2010 VH_{32}	—	November 3, 2010	Mount Lemmon	Mount Lemmon Survey	·	630 m	MPC · JPL
507214	2010 VC_{38}	—	November 4, 2010	La Sagra	OAM	·	710 m	MPC · JPL
507215	2010 VS_{38}	—	October 17, 2010	Mount Lemmon	Mount Lemmon Survey	V	630 m	MPC · JPL
507216	2010 VF_{81}	—	November 3, 2010	Mount Lemmon	Mount Lemmon Survey	·	1.2 km	MPC · JPL
507217	2010 VJ_{170}	—	November 1, 2010	Kitt Peak	Spacewatch	·	860 m	MPC · JPL
507218	2010 VT_{180}	—	November 11, 2010	Mount Lemmon	Mount Lemmon Survey	·	890 m	MPC · JPL
507219	2010 VS_{206}	—	September 20, 2003	Kitt Peak	Spacewatch	·	710 m	MPC · JPL
507220	2010 WJ_{19}	—	September 28, 2008	Mount Lemmon	Mount Lemmon Survey	L4	7.7 km	MPC · JPL
507221	2010 WP_{26}	—	September 3, 1999	Kitt Peak	Spacewatch	·	580 m	MPC · JPL
507222	2010 WU_{26}	—	October 29, 2010	Kitt Peak	Spacewatch	·	670 m	MPC · JPL
507223	2010 WJ_{72}	—	November 3, 2010	Kitt Peak	Spacewatch	·	710 m	MPC · JPL
507224	2010 XD_{5}	—	October 14, 2010	Mount Lemmon	Mount Lemmon Survey	·	620 m	MPC · JPL
507225	2010 XP_{45}	—	December 14, 1999	Catalina	CSS	PHO	1.1 km	MPC · JPL
507226	2010 XR_{84}	—	October 27, 2003	Kitt Peak	Spacewatch	·	580 m	MPC · JPL
507227	2010 XD_{86}	—	December 11, 2010	Catalina	CSS	PHO	1.2 km	MPC · JPL
507228	2010 YF_{1}	—	March 15, 2004	Catalina	CSS	·	820 m	MPC · JPL
507229	2011 AE_{21}	—	November 23, 2006	Kitt Peak	Spacewatch	·	830 m	MPC · JPL
507230	2011 AU_{33}	—	January 24, 1996	Kitt Peak	Spacewatch	·	1.0 km	MPC · JPL
507231	2011 AP_{36}	—	December 5, 2010	Mount Lemmon	Mount Lemmon Survey	·	810 m	MPC · JPL
507232	2011 AQ_{38}	—	October 11, 2009	Mount Lemmon	Mount Lemmon Survey	3:2 · SHU	3.7 km	MPC · JPL
507233	2011 AM_{40}	—	December 3, 2010	Mount Lemmon	Mount Lemmon Survey	·	1.1 km	MPC · JPL
507234	2011 AM_{42}	—	January 10, 2011	Mount Lemmon	Mount Lemmon Survey	·	1.1 km	MPC · JPL
507235	2011 AZ_{45}	—	January 10, 2011	Kitt Peak	Spacewatch	NYS	880 m	MPC · JPL
507236	2011 AX_{51}	—	January 13, 2011	Kitt Peak	Spacewatch	·	730 m	MPC · JPL
507237	2011 AB_{58}	—	November 16, 2006	Mount Lemmon	Mount Lemmon Survey	·	930 m	MPC · JPL
507238	2011 AZ_{68}	—	December 24, 2006	Kitt Peak	Spacewatch	NYS	800 m	MPC · JPL
507239	2011 BA_{15}	—	January 11, 2011	Mount Lemmon	Mount Lemmon Survey	·	930 m	MPC · JPL
507240	2011 BP_{17}	—	December 8, 2010	Mount Lemmon	Mount Lemmon Survey	·	1.1 km	MPC · JPL
507241	2011 BS_{26}	—	September 30, 2006	Mount Lemmon	Mount Lemmon Survey	NYS	1.1 km	MPC · JPL
507242	2011 BA_{35}	—	December 8, 2010	Mount Lemmon	Mount Lemmon Survey	·	1 km	MPC · JPL
507243	2011 BZ_{47}	—	December 26, 2006	Kitt Peak	Spacewatch	PHO	840 m	MPC · JPL
507244	2011 BD_{80}	—	December 9, 2010	Mount Lemmon	Mount Lemmon Survey	·	920 m	MPC · JPL
507245	2011 BC_{81}	—	January 13, 2011	Kitt Peak	Spacewatch	·	1.1 km	MPC · JPL
507246	2011 BF_{88}	—	October 26, 2009	Kitt Peak	Spacewatch	3:2	3.9 km	MPC · JPL
507247	2011 BV_{88}	—	January 27, 2011	Mount Lemmon	Mount Lemmon Survey	·	1.2 km	MPC · JPL
507248	2011 BP_{94}	—	November 15, 2006	Catalina	CSS	·	1.1 km	MPC · JPL
507249	2011 BZ_{100}	—	December 15, 2006	Kitt Peak	Spacewatch	·	1.0 km	MPC · JPL
507250	2011 BQ_{103}	—	November 24, 2009	Kitt Peak	Spacewatch	3:2	4.1 km	MPC · JPL
507251	2011 BP_{110}	—	July 26, 2008	Siding Spring	SSS	·	1.2 km	MPC · JPL
507252	2011 BR_{112}	—	January 8, 2011	Mount Lemmon	Mount Lemmon Survey	·	1.4 km	MPC · JPL
507253	2011 BP_{118}	—	October 28, 2006	Mount Lemmon	Mount Lemmon Survey	·	670 m	MPC · JPL
507254	2011 BL_{124}	—	January 24, 2011	Mount Lemmon	Mount Lemmon Survey	·	1.2 km	MPC · JPL
507255	2011 BD_{146}	—	January 28, 2007	Kitt Peak	Spacewatch	·	980 m	MPC · JPL
507256	2011 BE_{164}	—	August 30, 2005	Kitt Peak	Spacewatch	·	1.1 km	MPC · JPL
507257	2011 CQ_{2}	—	November 20, 2006	Kitt Peak	Spacewatch	NYS	780 m	MPC · JPL
507258	2011 CV_{36}	—	January 27, 2011	Mount Lemmon	Mount Lemmon Survey	MAS	550 m	MPC · JPL
507259	2011 CS_{40}	—	January 30, 2011	Mount Lemmon	Mount Lemmon Survey	·	1.0 km	MPC · JPL
507260	2011 CT_{45}	—	February 8, 2011	Mount Lemmon	Mount Lemmon Survey	V	620 m	MPC · JPL
507261	2011 CO_{46}	—	February 10, 2011	Catalina	CSS	·	570 m	MPC · JPL
507262	2011 CV_{52}	—	January 26, 2011	Catalina	CSS	H	390 m	MPC · JPL
507263	2011 CU_{58}	—	November 17, 2006	Kitt Peak	Spacewatch	MAS	490 m	MPC · JPL
507264	2011 CE_{62}	—	January 24, 2007	Mount Lemmon	Mount Lemmon Survey	·	930 m	MPC · JPL
507265	2011 CL_{112}	—	December 1, 2006	Mount Lemmon	Mount Lemmon Survey	·	900 m	MPC · JPL
507266	2011 CP_{114}	—	November 25, 2009	Mount Lemmon	Mount Lemmon Survey	·	1.5 km	MPC · JPL
507267	2011 DZ_{11}	—	February 10, 2011	Mount Lemmon	Mount Lemmon Survey	H	490 m	MPC · JPL
507268	2011 DO_{42}	—	February 4, 2011	Catalina	CSS	H	500 m	MPC · JPL
507269	2011 DK_{48}	—	January 27, 2007	Kitt Peak	Spacewatch	MAS	520 m	MPC · JPL
507270	2011 EL_{1}	—	January 28, 2011	Mount Lemmon	Mount Lemmon Survey	·	1.1 km	MPC · JPL
507271	2011 EB_{14}	—	March 2, 2011	Kitt Peak	Spacewatch	·	1.7 km	MPC · JPL
507272	2011 EK_{36}	—	March 6, 2011	Kitt Peak	Spacewatch	PHO	840 m	MPC · JPL
507273	2011 ET_{44}	—	January 8, 2011	Mount Lemmon	Mount Lemmon Survey	·	870 m	MPC · JPL
507274	2011 EV_{47}	—	March 5, 2011	Mount Lemmon	Mount Lemmon Survey	·	1.3 km	MPC · JPL
507275	2011 EJ_{66}	—	February 6, 2007	Mount Lemmon	Mount Lemmon Survey	MAS	570 m	MPC · JPL
507276	2011 EA_{79}	—	March 12, 2011	Mount Lemmon	Mount Lemmon Survey	H	510 m	MPC · JPL
507277	2011 FQ_{8}	—	March 11, 2011	Mount Lemmon	Mount Lemmon Survey	T_{j} (2.95)	3.3 km	MPC · JPL
507278	2011 FE_{10}	—	September 21, 2009	Mount Lemmon	Mount Lemmon Survey	·	1.0 km	MPC · JPL
507279	2011 FH_{14}	—	January 27, 2007	Kitt Peak	Spacewatch	·	1.0 km	MPC · JPL
507280	2011 FM_{51}	—	February 10, 2011	Catalina	CSS	H	480 m	MPC · JPL
507281	2011 FE_{102}	—	January 2, 2011	Mount Lemmon	Mount Lemmon Survey	·	1.9 km	MPC · JPL
507282	2011 FG_{150}	—	March 31, 2003	Kitt Peak	Spacewatch	·	1.3 km	MPC · JPL
507283	2011 GU_{40}	—	March 11, 2011	Catalina	CSS	·	1.2 km	MPC · JPL
507284	2011 GO_{46}	—	April 18, 2007	Mount Lemmon	Mount Lemmon Survey	·	1.0 km	MPC · JPL
507285	2011 HW_{20}	—	April 24, 2011	Mount Lemmon	Mount Lemmon Survey	·	1.5 km	MPC · JPL
507286	2011 HW_{31}	—	April 22, 2011	Kitt Peak	Spacewatch	·	1.7 km	MPC · JPL
507287	2011 HL_{43}	—	April 27, 2011	Kitt Peak	Spacewatch	H	570 m	MPC · JPL
507288	2011 HX_{51}	—	May 21, 2007	Kitt Peak	Spacewatch	·	1.0 km	MPC · JPL
507289	2011 HG_{61}	—	April 29, 2011	Mount Lemmon	Mount Lemmon Survey	H	580 m	MPC · JPL
507290	2011 HZ_{61}	—	September 24, 2009	Kitt Peak	Spacewatch	H	370 m	MPC · JPL
507291	2011 HK_{75}	—	April 2, 2011	Mount Lemmon	Mount Lemmon Survey	·	920 m	MPC · JPL
507292	2011 HZ_{83}	—	April 6, 2011	Kitt Peak	Spacewatch	·	1.7 km	MPC · JPL
507293	2011 JG_{9}	—	May 5, 2011	Kitt Peak	Spacewatch	H	450 m	MPC · JPL
507294	2011 JJ_{9}	—	May 6, 2011	Kitt Peak	Spacewatch	·	1.9 km	MPC · JPL
507295	2011 KJ_{11}	—	January 14, 2011	Mount Lemmon	Mount Lemmon Survey	·	1.4 km	MPC · JPL
507296	2011 KM_{19}	—	May 30, 2011	Haleakala	Pan-STARRS 1	H	650 m	MPC · JPL
507297	2011 KB_{31}	—	January 7, 2006	Mount Lemmon	Mount Lemmon Survey	·	1.1 km	MPC · JPL
507298	2011 KV_{33}	—	May 21, 2011	Haleakala	Pan-STARRS 1	·	1.9 km	MPC · JPL
507299	2011 KS_{37}	—	May 8, 2011	Mount Lemmon	Mount Lemmon Survey	·	2.7 km	MPC · JPL
507300	2011 KS_{40}	—	May 24, 2011	Haleakala	Pan-STARRS 1	·	1.3 km	MPC · JPL

== 507301–507400 ==
back to top

Designation			Discovery			Properties		Ref
Permanent	Provisional	Named after	Date	Site	Discoverer(s)	Category	Diam.	Ref
507301	2011 LY_{7}	—	June 5, 2011	Kitt Peak	Spacewatch	·	1.6 km	MPC · JPL
507302	2011 LL_{12}	—	May 24, 2011	Mount Lemmon	Mount Lemmon Survey	MRX	790 m	MPC · JPL
507303	2011 LO_{12}	—	May 21, 2011	Haleakala	Pan-STARRS 1	·	1.9 km	MPC · JPL
507304	2011 LM_{18}	—	June 9, 2011	Mount Lemmon	Mount Lemmon Survey	H	470 m	MPC · JPL
507305	2011 OO_{11}	—	July 25, 2011	Haleakala	Pan-STARRS 1	·	1.5 km	MPC · JPL
507306	2011 OH_{17}	—	July 29, 2011	Haleakala	Pan-STARRS 1	MAR	1.5 km	MPC · JPL
507307	2011 OO_{60}	—	July 25, 2011	Haleakala	Pan-STARRS 1	L5	8.0 km	MPC · JPL
507308	2011 OQ_{60}	—	September 27, 2006	Catalina	CSS	·	2.4 km	MPC · JPL
507309	2011 PJ_{11}	—	July 28, 2011	Haleakala	Pan-STARRS 1	EOS	1.3 km	MPC · JPL
507310	2011 QF_{9}	—	July 21, 2010	WISE	WISE	·	3.0 km	MPC · JPL
507311	2011 QP_{21}	—	June 8, 2011	Haleakala	Pan-STARRS 1	CYB	4.1 km	MPC · JPL
507312	2011 QS_{22}	—	July 12, 2010	WISE	WISE	·	3.1 km	MPC · JPL
507313	2011 QW_{28}	—	June 1, 2005	Kitt Peak	Spacewatch	·	1.6 km	MPC · JPL
507314	2011 QH_{37}	—	August 27, 2011	Haleakala	Pan-STARRS 1	·	1.5 km	MPC · JPL
507315	2011 QF_{40}	—	May 7, 2010	Kitt Peak	Spacewatch	CYB	3.2 km	MPC · JPL
507316	2011 QS_{65}	—	January 13, 2008	Kitt Peak	Spacewatch	·	2.8 km	MPC · JPL
507317	2011 QU_{67}	—	August 29, 2011	Siding Spring	SSS	·	3.5 km	MPC · JPL
507318	2011 QY_{73}	—	October 20, 2006	Mount Lemmon	Mount Lemmon Survey	·	2.0 km	MPC · JPL
507319	2011 QH_{79}	—	June 10, 2011	Mount Lemmon	Mount Lemmon Survey	·	3.4 km	MPC · JPL
507320	2011 RR_{15}	—	September 15, 2011	Haleakala	Pan-STARRS 1	·	1.7 km	MPC · JPL
507321	2011 RM_{18}	—	September 7, 2011	Kitt Peak	Spacewatch	·	2.0 km	MPC · JPL
507322	2011 RG_{19}	—	September 7, 2011	Kitt Peak	Spacewatch	VER	2.3 km	MPC · JPL
507323	2011 SD_{14}	—	August 30, 2011	Haleakala	Pan-STARRS 1	·	2.5 km	MPC · JPL
507324	2011 SD_{50}	—	October 21, 2006	Mount Lemmon	Mount Lemmon Survey	·	1.4 km	MPC · JPL
507325	2011 SS_{90}	—	May 4, 2010	Kitt Peak	Spacewatch	THB	2.1 km	MPC · JPL
507326	2011 SC_{105}	—	September 23, 2011	Kitt Peak	Spacewatch	·	3.2 km	MPC · JPL
507327	2011 SB_{124}	—	September 21, 2011	Kitt Peak	Spacewatch	·	2.8 km	MPC · JPL
507328	2011 SL_{131}	—	September 23, 2011	Haleakala	Pan-STARRS 1	T_{j} (2.98)	3.5 km	MPC · JPL
507329	2011 SN_{198}	—	August 20, 2011	Haleakala	Pan-STARRS 1	·	2.0 km	MPC · JPL
507330	2011 SO_{203}	—	March 12, 1996	Kitt Peak	Spacewatch	T_{j} (2.99)	2.3 km	MPC · JPL
507331	2011 SC_{215}	—	September 21, 2011	Kitt Peak	Spacewatch	T_{j} (2.99) · EUP	2.4 km	MPC · JPL
507332	2011 SP_{235}	—	September 23, 2011	Kitt Peak	Spacewatch	EOS	1.9 km	MPC · JPL
507333	2011 SB_{278}	—	October 31, 2006	Mount Lemmon	Mount Lemmon Survey	·	2.0 km	MPC · JPL
507334	2011 UX_{1}	—	December 13, 2006	Mount Lemmon	Mount Lemmon Survey	·	2.4 km	MPC · JPL
507335	2011 UJ_{13}	—	September 8, 2011	Haleakala	Pan-STARRS 1	·	3.3 km	MPC · JPL
507336	2011 UO_{22}	—	October 1, 2011	Kitt Peak	Spacewatch	·	2.3 km	MPC · JPL
507337	2011 UB_{59}	—	July 3, 2005	Mount Lemmon	Mount Lemmon Survey	·	2.4 km	MPC · JPL
507338	2011 UK_{62}	—	October 31, 2006	Mount Lemmon	Mount Lemmon Survey	EOS	1.7 km	MPC · JPL
507339	2011 UR_{71}	—	November 27, 2006	Kitt Peak	Spacewatch	·	2.4 km	MPC · JPL
507340	2011 UF_{93}	—	October 18, 2011	Mount Lemmon	Mount Lemmon Survey	·	2.3 km	MPC · JPL
507341	2011 UX_{111}	—	October 1, 2011	Kitt Peak	Spacewatch	·	2.1 km	MPC · JPL
507342	2011 UQ_{130}	—	October 18, 2011	Catalina	CSS	EUP	3.5 km	MPC · JPL
507343	2011 UR_{148}	—	October 22, 2011	Kitt Peak	Spacewatch	·	2.2 km	MPC · JPL
507344	2011 UC_{195}	—	July 5, 2011	Haleakala	Pan-STARRS 1	·	2.8 km	MPC · JPL
507345	2011 UQ_{259}	—	April 15, 2010	Mount Lemmon	Mount Lemmon Survey	·	1.3 km	MPC · JPL
507346	2011 UJ_{270}	—	September 23, 2011	Haleakala	Pan-STARRS 1	HYG	2.7 km	MPC · JPL
507347	2011 UG_{325}	—	October 19, 2011	Mount Lemmon	Mount Lemmon Survey	EOS	1.6 km	MPC · JPL
507348	2011 UK_{329}	—	December 20, 2000	Kitt Peak	Spacewatch	·	2.5 km	MPC · JPL
507349	2011 US_{330}	—	December 15, 2006	Socorro	LINEAR	·	3.0 km	MPC · JPL
507350	2011 UO_{337}	—	September 4, 2011	Haleakala	Pan-STARRS 1	·	2.1 km	MPC · JPL
507351	2011 UU_{337}	—	September 20, 2011	Kitt Peak	Spacewatch	·	2.8 km	MPC · JPL
507352	2011 UW_{361}	—	October 21, 2011	Mount Lemmon	Mount Lemmon Survey	·	3.0 km	MPC · JPL
507353	2011 US_{385}	—	October 25, 2011	Haleakala	Pan-STARRS 1	·	2.5 km	MPC · JPL
507354	2011 UQ_{402}	—	October 26, 2011	Haleakala	Pan-STARRS 1	L4 · ERY	7.1 km	MPC · JPL
507355	2011 VV_{5}	—	November 3, 2011	Catalina	CSS	APO	540 m	MPC · JPL
507356	2011 VE_{23}	—	October 29, 2011	Haleakala	Pan-STARRS 1	·	2.5 km	MPC · JPL
507357	2011 WA_{6}	—	April 25, 2007	Mount Lemmon	Mount Lemmon Survey	·	1.2 km	MPC · JPL
507358	2011 WT_{39}	—	March 11, 2008	Kitt Peak	Spacewatch	·	2.9 km	MPC · JPL
507359	2011 WX_{64}	—	April 25, 2010	WISE	WISE	T_{j} (2.98) · CYB	3.2 km	MPC · JPL
507360	2011 WO_{84}	—	October 26, 2011	Haleakala	Pan-STARRS 1	TIR	2.7 km	MPC · JPL
507361	2011 WH_{124}	—	October 22, 2005	Kitt Peak	Spacewatch	CYB	1.7 km	MPC · JPL
507362	2011 WN_{146}	—	June 9, 2010	WISE	WISE	T_{j} (2.99) · (895)	4.2 km	MPC · JPL
507363	2011 WM_{150}	—	October 23, 2011	Haleakala	Pan-STARRS 1	·	2.4 km	MPC · JPL
507364	2011 WE_{153}	—	October 23, 2011	Haleakala	Pan-STARRS 1	·	2.5 km	MPC · JPL
507365	2011 WY_{157}	—	October 8, 2005	Catalina	CSS	·	4.0 km	MPC · JPL
507366	2011 XO_{3}	—	December 1, 2011	Catalina	CSS	T_{j} (2.69) · AMO +1km	1.5 km	MPC · JPL
507367	2011 YW_{21}	—	June 19, 2010	WISE	WISE	·	3.9 km	MPC · JPL
507368	2011 YQ_{42}	—	December 28, 2000	Kitt Peak	Spacewatch	·	3.7 km	MPC · JPL
507369	2011 YM_{66}	—	February 1, 2009	Kitt Peak	Spacewatch	·	620 m	MPC · JPL
507370	2011 YF_{75}	—	January 28, 2010	WISE	WISE	L4	7.9 km	MPC · JPL
507371	2012 AL_{21}	—	July 1, 2010	WISE	WISE	T_{j} (2.99)	4.6 km	MPC · JPL
507372	2012 BO_{34}	—	January 21, 2012	Haleakala	Pan-STARRS 1	·	4.9 km	MPC · JPL
507373	2012 BG_{99}	—	September 10, 2007	Mount Lemmon	Mount Lemmon Survey	·	470 m	MPC · JPL
507374	2012 CA_{17}	—	March 16, 2009	Kitt Peak	Spacewatch	·	520 m	MPC · JPL
507375	2012 CR_{34}	—	October 12, 2007	Mount Lemmon	Mount Lemmon Survey	·	470 m	MPC · JPL
507376	2012 CB_{58}	—	January 21, 2012	Kitt Peak	Spacewatch	·	610 m	MPC · JPL
507377	2012 DY_{20}	—	February 4, 2012	Haleakala	Pan-STARRS 1	·	1.0 km	MPC · JPL
507378	2012 DW_{22}	—	September 16, 2010	Mount Lemmon	Mount Lemmon Survey	·	710 m	MPC · JPL
507379	2012 DK_{71}	—	December 19, 2004	Mount Lemmon	Mount Lemmon Survey	·	540 m	MPC · JPL
507380	2012 DA_{100}	—	October 17, 2007	Mount Lemmon	Mount Lemmon Survey	·	570 m	MPC · JPL
507381	2012 EH	—	November 4, 2007	Mount Lemmon	Mount Lemmon Survey	·	490 m	MPC · JPL
507382	2012 EZ_{18}	—	June 7, 2008	Kitt Peak	Spacewatch	·	1.3 km	MPC · JPL
507383	2012 FV_{39}	—	August 22, 1995	Kitt Peak	Spacewatch	(2076)	950 m	MPC · JPL
507384	2012 FU_{50}	—	April 12, 2005	Kitt Peak	Spacewatch	·	790 m	MPC · JPL
507385	2012 FS_{59}	—	February 24, 2012	Kitt Peak	Spacewatch	·	1.1 km	MPC · JPL
507386	2012 FZ_{67}	—	September 11, 2010	Mount Lemmon	Mount Lemmon Survey	·	940 m	MPC · JPL
507387	2012 FW_{82}	—	March 20, 2012	Haleakala	Pan-STARRS 1	·	820 m	MPC · JPL
507388	2012 FB_{85}	—	May 2, 2008	Kitt Peak	Spacewatch	KON	3.0 km	MPC · JPL
507389	2012 GA_{14}	—	June 10, 2005	Kitt Peak	Spacewatch	·	1.1 km	MPC · JPL
507390	2012 GT_{26}	—	April 15, 2012	Haleakala	Pan-STARRS 1	·	1.0 km	MPC · JPL
507391	2012 GP_{33}	—	August 17, 2009	La Sagra	OAM	·	1.2 km	MPC · JPL
507392	2012 GF_{39}	—	April 13, 2012	Catalina	CSS	·	690 m	MPC · JPL
507393	2012 HB_{35}	—	February 8, 2008	Kitt Peak	Spacewatch	V	540 m	MPC · JPL
507394	2012 HA_{40}	—	March 17, 2012	Catalina	CSS	PHO	1.0 km	MPC · JPL
507395	2012 HF_{49}	—	April 4, 2005	Catalina	CSS	·	580 m	MPC · JPL
507396	2012 HM_{56}	—	March 16, 2012	Kitt Peak	Spacewatch	·	1.4 km	MPC · JPL
507397	2012 HN_{68}	—	March 23, 2012	Kitt Peak	Spacewatch	·	550 m	MPC · JPL
507398	2012 HO_{71}	—	April 24, 2012	Mount Lemmon	Mount Lemmon Survey	·	800 m	MPC · JPL
507399	2012 JN_{7}	—	April 21, 2012	Mount Lemmon	Mount Lemmon Survey	·	1.2 km	MPC · JPL
507400	2012 JT_{9}	—	April 28, 2012	Mount Lemmon	Mount Lemmon Survey	·	940 m	MPC · JPL

== 507401–507500 ==
back to top

Designation			Discovery			Properties		Ref
Permanent	Provisional	Named after	Date	Site	Discoverer(s)	Category	Diam.	Ref
507401	2012 JY_{19}	—	November 27, 2010	Mount Lemmon	Mount Lemmon Survey	PHO	810 m	MPC · JPL
507402	2012 JW_{36}	—	April 20, 2012	Mount Lemmon	Mount Lemmon Survey	·	580 m	MPC · JPL
507403	2012 JT_{37}	—	November 1, 2010	Mount Lemmon	Mount Lemmon Survey	·	620 m	MPC · JPL
507404	2012 KN_{9}	—	May 16, 2012	Kitt Peak	Spacewatch	·	1.1 km	MPC · JPL
507405	2012 KP_{15}	—	April 6, 2008	Mount Lemmon	Mount Lemmon Survey	·	1.0 km	MPC · JPL
507406	2012 KL_{22}	—	September 19, 2009	Kitt Peak	Spacewatch	NYS	980 m	MPC · JPL
507407	2012 KY_{24}	—	January 28, 2004	Kitt Peak	Spacewatch	NYS	1.1 km	MPC · JPL
507408	2012 KY_{51}	—	May 7, 2008	Mount Lemmon	Mount Lemmon Survey	·	1.3 km	MPC · JPL
507409	2012 LM_{16}	—	November 30, 2005	Mount Lemmon	Mount Lemmon Survey	·	1.1 km	MPC · JPL
507410	2012 LD_{23}	—	May 21, 2012	Mount Lemmon	Mount Lemmon Survey	V	520 m	MPC · JPL
507411	2012 MQ_{6}	—	December 14, 2004	Socorro	LINEAR	·	1.5 km	MPC · JPL
507412	2012 OK	—	September 16, 2003	Socorro	LINEAR	·	1.6 km	MPC · JPL
507413	2012 OC_{4}	—	April 29, 2003	Socorro	LINEAR	·	2.0 km	MPC · JPL
507414	2012 PE	—	June 20, 2012	Mount Lemmon	Mount Lemmon Survey	·	600 m	MPC · JPL
507415	2012 PY_{6}	—	August 8, 2012	Haleakala	Pan-STARRS 1	·	1.6 km	MPC · JPL
507416	2012 PL_{10}	—	August 24, 2008	La Sagra	OAM	EUN	970 m	MPC · JPL
507417	2012 PH_{17}	—	September 4, 2008	Kitt Peak	Spacewatch	·	1.3 km	MPC · JPL
507418	2012 PR_{20}	—	October 28, 2008	Kitt Peak	Spacewatch	AGN	930 m	MPC · JPL
507419	2012 PW_{29}	—	November 3, 2004	Kitt Peak	Spacewatch	·	1.3 km	MPC · JPL
507420	2012 PG_{30}	—	April 29, 2003	Kitt Peak	Spacewatch	(5)	1.5 km	MPC · JPL
507421	2012 PS_{30}	—	March 9, 2011	Kitt Peak	Spacewatch	·	2.4 km	MPC · JPL
507422	2012 QB_{17}	—	August 23, 2012	La Sagra	OAM	AMO	340 m	MPC · JPL
507423	2012 QS_{22}	—	August 14, 2012	Kitt Peak	Spacewatch	·	1.4 km	MPC · JPL
507424	2012 QT_{28}	—	September 22, 2003	Kitt Peak	Spacewatch	·	1.3 km	MPC · JPL
507425	2012 QQ_{33}	—	August 25, 2012	Kitt Peak	Spacewatch	·	1.7 km	MPC · JPL
507426	2012 QA_{36}	—	August 13, 2012	Kitt Peak	Spacewatch	·	1.9 km	MPC · JPL
507427	2012 QD_{37}	—	May 31, 2011	Mount Lemmon	Mount Lemmon Survey	·	1.9 km	MPC · JPL
507428	2012 QL_{37}	—	November 20, 2003	Kitt Peak	Spacewatch	·	1.7 km	MPC · JPL
507429	2012 QQ_{52}	—	November 19, 2008	Mount Lemmon	Mount Lemmon Survey	·	1.9 km	MPC · JPL
507430	2012 RR_{4}	—	May 6, 2011	Mount Lemmon	Mount Lemmon Survey	·	1.7 km	MPC · JPL
507431	2012 RR_{7}	—	October 21, 2003	Kitt Peak	Spacewatch	DOR	2.4 km	MPC · JPL
507432	2012 RY_{8}	—	October 6, 1999	Kitt Peak	Spacewatch	·	1.7 km	MPC · JPL
507433	2012 RA_{20}	—	September 15, 2012	La Sagra	OAM	BRA	1.8 km	MPC · JPL
507434	2012 RZ_{34}	—	April 30, 2006	Kitt Peak	Spacewatch	·	1.9 km	MPC · JPL
507435	2012 RF_{39}	—	February 27, 2006	Kitt Peak	Spacewatch	·	1.7 km	MPC · JPL
507436	2012 SW_{1}	—	September 16, 2012	Kitt Peak	Spacewatch	·	1.3 km	MPC · JPL
507437	2012 SY_{4}	—	September 17, 2012	Mount Lemmon	Mount Lemmon Survey	·	1.5 km	MPC · JPL
507438	2012 SG_{17}	—	September 17, 2012	Mount Lemmon	Mount Lemmon Survey	·	1.5 km	MPC · JPL
507439	2012 SS_{17}	—	October 16, 2007	Kitt Peak	Spacewatch	·	1.1 km	MPC · JPL
507440	2012 SY_{31}	—	September 21, 2012	La Sagra	OAM	EUN	1.3 km	MPC · JPL
507441	2012 SE_{40}	—	May 24, 2011	Haleakala	Pan-STARRS 1	HOF	2.2 km	MPC · JPL
507442	2012 SR_{40}	—	October 12, 1998	Kitt Peak	Spacewatch	·	2.2 km	MPC · JPL
507443	2012 SL_{45}	—	August 25, 2012	Haleakala	Pan-STARRS 1	·	1.8 km	MPC · JPL
507444	2012 ST_{49}	—	May 25, 2006	Mauna Kea	P. A. Wiegert	KOR	1.3 km	MPC · JPL
507445	2012 SF_{68}	—	October 12, 2007	Mount Lemmon	Mount Lemmon Survey	·	2.0 km	MPC · JPL
507446	2012 TR_{16}	—	September 4, 2007	Mount Lemmon	Mount Lemmon Survey	·	1.6 km	MPC · JPL
507447	2012 TG_{31}	—	October 21, 2003	Kitt Peak	Spacewatch	·	1.9 km	MPC · JPL
507448	2012 TC_{38}	—	September 24, 2012	Kitt Peak	Spacewatch	HOF	2.6 km	MPC · JPL
507449	2012 TU_{39}	—	May 3, 2011	Mount Lemmon	Mount Lemmon Survey	·	1.8 km	MPC · JPL
507450	2012 TD_{54}	—	October 6, 2012	Kitt Peak	Spacewatch	·	2.3 km	MPC · JPL
507451	2012 TS_{66}	—	March 15, 2010	Mount Lemmon	Mount Lemmon Survey	·	1.8 km	MPC · JPL
507452	2012 TH_{84}	—	September 11, 2007	Mount Lemmon	Mount Lemmon Survey	KOR	1.2 km	MPC · JPL
507453	2012 TW_{86}	—	September 13, 2007	Mount Lemmon	Mount Lemmon Survey	KOR	1 km	MPC · JPL
507454	2012 TC_{131}	—	September 11, 2012	Siding Spring	SSS	·	1.5 km	MPC · JPL
507455	2012 TJ_{139}	—	June 4, 2011	Mount Lemmon	Mount Lemmon Survey	·	3.0 km	MPC · JPL
507456	2012 TY_{141}	—	October 13, 1998	Kitt Peak	Spacewatch	·	1.4 km	MPC · JPL
507457	2012 TD_{142}	—	February 21, 2006	Mount Lemmon	Mount Lemmon Survey	·	1.5 km	MPC · JPL
507458	2012 TV_{142}	—	August 10, 2007	Kitt Peak	Spacewatch	·	2.1 km	MPC · JPL
507459	2012 TW_{146}	—	August 26, 2012	Haleakala	Pan-STARRS 1	·	1.6 km	MPC · JPL
507460	2012 TO_{147}	—	September 15, 2012	La Sagra	OAM	JUN	1.2 km	MPC · JPL
507461	2012 TD_{157}	—	September 4, 2007	Catalina	CSS	KOR	1.1 km	MPC · JPL
507462	2012 TS_{161}	—	October 8, 2012	Haleakala	Pan-STARRS 1	·	1.7 km	MPC · JPL
507463	2012 TY_{168}	—	October 8, 2012	Haleakala	Pan-STARRS 1	·	1.6 km	MPC · JPL
507464	2012 TR_{175}	—	September 17, 2012	Mount Lemmon	Mount Lemmon Survey	HOF	2.3 km	MPC · JPL
507465	2012 TE_{176}	—	September 12, 2007	Mount Lemmon	Mount Lemmon Survey	KOR	1.1 km	MPC · JPL
507466	2012 TN_{187}	—	November 14, 1998	Kitt Peak	Spacewatch	·	1.8 km	MPC · JPL
507467	2012 TF_{199}	—	October 11, 2012	Kitt Peak	Spacewatch	GEF	1.2 km	MPC · JPL
507468	2012 TM_{208}	—	September 21, 2003	Kitt Peak	Spacewatch	·	1.6 km	MPC · JPL
507469	2012 TN_{215}	—	April 24, 2011	Mount Lemmon	Mount Lemmon Survey	H	390 m	MPC · JPL
507470	2012 TL_{239}	—	October 8, 2012	Mount Lemmon	Mount Lemmon Survey	·	1.8 km	MPC · JPL
507471	2012 TO_{240}	—	December 31, 2008	XuYi	PMO NEO Survey Program	·	1.6 km	MPC · JPL
507472	2012 TQ_{240}	—	October 8, 2012	Mount Lemmon	Mount Lemmon Survey	·	1.6 km	MPC · JPL
507473	2012 TB_{246}	—	August 24, 2012	Kitt Peak	Spacewatch	·	1.7 km	MPC · JPL
507474	2012 TQ_{255}	—	September 19, 2012	Mount Lemmon	Mount Lemmon Survey	·	1.5 km	MPC · JPL
507475	2012 TZ_{258}	—	September 19, 2001	Socorro	LINEAR	·	1.9 km	MPC · JPL
507476	2012 TS_{260}	—	October 7, 2012	Haleakala	Pan-STARRS 1	·	1.5 km	MPC · JPL
507477	2012 TV_{261}	—	February 16, 2010	Kitt Peak	Spacewatch	KOR	1.1 km	MPC · JPL
507478	2012 TT_{262}	—	October 9, 2007	Kitt Peak	Spacewatch	·	1.2 km	MPC · JPL
507479	2012 TP_{288}	—	October 10, 2012	Mount Lemmon	Mount Lemmon Survey	EMA	2.8 km	MPC · JPL
507480	2012 TF_{289}	—	December 29, 2008	Mount Lemmon	Mount Lemmon Survey	·	1.5 km	MPC · JPL
507481	2012 TN_{293}	—	January 29, 2009	Mount Lemmon	Mount Lemmon Survey	EOS	2.1 km	MPC · JPL
507482	2012 TP_{306}	—	September 25, 2012	Mount Lemmon	Mount Lemmon Survey	·	1.8 km	MPC · JPL
507483	2012 TP_{325}	—	October 9, 2012	Mount Lemmon	Mount Lemmon Survey	·	1.7 km	MPC · JPL
507484	2012 TS_{325}	—	October 6, 2012	Haleakala	Pan-STARRS 1	·	1.5 km	MPC · JPL
507485	2012 UE_{3}	—	January 7, 2000	Kitt Peak	Spacewatch	AGN	1.1 km	MPC · JPL
507486	2012 UZ_{10}	—	October 8, 2012	Mount Lemmon	Mount Lemmon Survey	HOF	2.0 km	MPC · JPL
507487	2012 UC_{19}	—	October 16, 2012	Mount Lemmon	Mount Lemmon Survey	AST	1.4 km	MPC · JPL
507488	2012 UX_{19}	—	February 2, 2005	Kitt Peak	Spacewatch	AGN	1.1 km	MPC · JPL
507489	2012 UF_{28}	—	October 16, 2012	Kitt Peak	Spacewatch	·	2.8 km	MPC · JPL
507490 Possum	2012 UZ_{28}	Possum	October 9, 2012	Catalina	CSS	(18466)	2.2 km	MPC · JPL
507491	2012 UE_{44}	—	October 18, 2012	Mount Lemmon	Mount Lemmon Survey	·	2.5 km	MPC · JPL
507492	2012 UY_{59}	—	October 19, 2012	Haleakala	Pan-STARRS 1	·	1.8 km	MPC · JPL
507493	2012 UG_{62}	—	October 8, 2007	Mount Lemmon	Mount Lemmon Survey	KOR	1.2 km	MPC · JPL
507494	2012 UG_{67}	—	October 8, 2012	Haleakala	Pan-STARRS 1	·	1.7 km	MPC · JPL
507495	2012 UB_{71}	—	October 17, 2012	Haleakala	Pan-STARRS 1	GEF	1.1 km	MPC · JPL
507496	2012 UD_{89}	—	April 24, 2006	Mount Lemmon	Mount Lemmon Survey	H	380 m	MPC · JPL
507497	2012 UJ_{90}	—	October 9, 2012	Mount Lemmon	Mount Lemmon Survey	·	1.8 km	MPC · JPL
507498	2012 UM_{91}	—	September 10, 2007	Kitt Peak	Spacewatch	·	1.5 km	MPC · JPL
507499	2012 UP_{91}	—	September 11, 2007	Mount Lemmon	Mount Lemmon Survey	KOR	1.2 km	MPC · JPL
507500	2012 UB_{141}	—	October 18, 2012	Haleakala	Pan-STARRS 1	·	2.5 km	MPC · JPL

== 507501–507600 ==
back to top

Designation			Discovery			Properties		Ref
Permanent	Provisional	Named after	Date	Site	Discoverer(s)	Category	Diam.	Ref
507501	2012 UG_{145}	—	October 18, 2012	Haleakala	Pan-STARRS 1	·	1.9 km	MPC · JPL
507502	2012 UR_{155}	—	October 14, 2012	Kitt Peak	Spacewatch	·	2.6 km	MPC · JPL
507503	2012 UZ_{157}	—	September 16, 2004	Anderson Mesa	LONEOS	H	480 m	MPC · JPL
507504	2012 UD_{163}	—	October 22, 2012	Haleakala	Pan-STARRS 1	BRA	1.1 km	MPC · JPL
507505	2012 UL_{165}	—	October 17, 2003	Kitt Peak	Spacewatch	·	1.4 km	MPC · JPL
507506	2012 UA_{179}	—	October 20, 2007	Mount Lemmon	Mount Lemmon Survey	EOS	1.7 km	MPC · JPL
507507	2012 VN_{12}	—	November 4, 2012	Mount Lemmon	Mount Lemmon Survey	KOR	1.1 km	MPC · JPL
507508	2012 VY_{12}	—	September 10, 2007	Mount Lemmon	Mount Lemmon Survey	·	1.5 km	MPC · JPL
507509	2012 VP_{13}	—	September 12, 2007	Mount Lemmon	Mount Lemmon Survey	KOR	1.1 km	MPC · JPL
507510	2012 VS_{20}	—	October 18, 2007	Mount Lemmon	Mount Lemmon Survey	·	1.7 km	MPC · JPL
507511	2012 VX_{22}	—	October 30, 2007	Mount Lemmon	Mount Lemmon Survey	·	1.4 km	MPC · JPL
507512	2012 VA_{27}	—	September 10, 2007	Kitt Peak	Spacewatch	·	1.8 km	MPC · JPL
507513	2012 VD_{31}	—	November 20, 2001	Socorro	LINEAR	·	2.5 km	MPC · JPL
507514	2012 VE_{36}	—	April 9, 2010	Kitt Peak	Spacewatch	·	1.7 km	MPC · JPL
507515	2012 VG_{41}	—	October 17, 2012	Haleakala	Pan-STARRS 1	HOF	2.4 km	MPC · JPL
507516	2012 VT_{50}	—	March 8, 2005	Mount Lemmon	Mount Lemmon Survey	HOF	2.3 km	MPC · JPL
507517	2012 VM_{52}	—	October 30, 2007	Kitt Peak	Spacewatch	KOR	1.2 km	MPC · JPL
507518	2012 VG_{61}	—	December 4, 2007	Kitt Peak	Spacewatch	·	1.5 km	MPC · JPL
507519	2012 VF_{68}	—	March 26, 2011	Catalina	CSS	H	590 m	MPC · JPL
507520	2012 VF_{73}	—	October 20, 2007	Mount Lemmon	Mount Lemmon Survey	·	1.4 km	MPC · JPL
507521	2012 VD_{76}	—	May 13, 2009	Kitt Peak	Spacewatch	·	2.6 km	MPC · JPL
507522	2012 VS_{78}	—	November 3, 2007	Kitt Peak	Spacewatch	·	3.1 km	MPC · JPL
507523	2012 VE_{86}	—	October 19, 2007	Mount Lemmon	Mount Lemmon Survey	H	650 m	MPC · JPL
507524	2012 VT_{90}	—	August 2, 2011	Haleakala	Pan-STARRS 1	·	2.6 km	MPC · JPL
507525	2012 VV_{91}	—	November 19, 2007	Kitt Peak	Spacewatch	·	1.9 km	MPC · JPL
507526	2012 VA_{94}	—	November 12, 2012	Mount Lemmon	Mount Lemmon Survey	·	1.6 km	MPC · JPL
507527	2012 VK_{108}	—	October 21, 2007	Kitt Peak	Spacewatch	·	1.8 km	MPC · JPL
507528	2012 VM_{114}	—	October 23, 2012	Mount Lemmon	Mount Lemmon Survey	·	3.1 km	MPC · JPL
507529	2012 WW	—	November 17, 2012	Mount Lemmon	Mount Lemmon Survey	EOS	1.5 km	MPC · JPL
507530	2012 WZ_{7}	—	October 13, 2007	Mount Lemmon	Mount Lemmon Survey	·	1.4 km	MPC · JPL
507531	2012 WM_{10}	—	November 5, 2012	Kitt Peak	Spacewatch	·	1.7 km	MPC · JPL
507532	2012 WS_{12}	—	December 4, 2007	Kitt Peak	Spacewatch	·	1.4 km	MPC · JPL
507533	2012 WY_{26}	—	November 4, 2007	Mount Lemmon	Mount Lemmon Survey	·	2.3 km	MPC · JPL
507534	2012 WL_{28}	—	May 31, 2006	Mount Lemmon	Mount Lemmon Survey	H	450 m	MPC · JPL
507535	2012 WB_{30}	—	October 8, 2007	Mount Lemmon	Mount Lemmon Survey	KOR	1.2 km	MPC · JPL
507536	2012 XU_{33}	—	September 19, 2011	Haleakala	Pan-STARRS 1	·	2.2 km	MPC · JPL
507537	2012 XW_{39}	—	December 4, 2007	Kitt Peak	Spacewatch	·	1.8 km	MPC · JPL
507538	2012 XK_{41}	—	December 16, 2007	Kitt Peak	Spacewatch	·	1.6 km	MPC · JPL
507539	2012 XL_{46}	—	November 26, 2012	Mount Lemmon	Mount Lemmon Survey	·	3.1 km	MPC · JPL
507540	2012 XV_{55}	—	December 9, 2012	Haleakala	Pan-STARRS 1	H	480 m	MPC · JPL
507541	2012 XP_{57}	—	October 21, 2012	Haleakala	Pan-STARRS 1	·	1.4 km	MPC · JPL
507542	2012 XM_{70}	—	September 17, 2006	Kitt Peak	Spacewatch	·	2.7 km	MPC · JPL
507543	2012 XK_{80}	—	December 6, 2012	Mount Lemmon	Mount Lemmon Survey	·	1.5 km	MPC · JPL
507544	2012 XS_{91}	—	November 7, 2012	Kitt Peak	Spacewatch	·	1.6 km	MPC · JPL
507545	2012 XJ_{99}	—	November 13, 2012	Kitt Peak	Spacewatch	·	1.7 km	MPC · JPL
507546	2012 XZ_{100}	—	September 19, 2011	Haleakala	Pan-STARRS 1	·	3.3 km	MPC · JPL
507547	2012 XD_{108}	—	November 5, 2007	Mount Lemmon	Mount Lemmon Survey	·	1.6 km	MPC · JPL
507548	2012 XY_{115}	—	December 7, 2012	Haleakala	Pan-STARRS 1	·	2.3 km	MPC · JPL
507549	2012 XY_{116}	—	November 27, 2012	Mount Lemmon	Mount Lemmon Survey	H	510 m	MPC · JPL
507550	2012 XB_{131}	—	November 26, 2012	Mount Lemmon	Mount Lemmon Survey	EOS	1.9 km	MPC · JPL
507551	2012 XK_{148}	—	December 4, 2012	Mount Lemmon	Mount Lemmon Survey	EOS	2.0 km	MPC · JPL
507552	2012 XV_{150}	—	December 31, 2007	Kitt Peak	Spacewatch	·	2.2 km	MPC · JPL
507553	2012 XV_{155}	—	December 9, 2012	Mount Lemmon	Mount Lemmon Survey	H	530 m	MPC · JPL
507554	2012 YY_{1}	—	November 9, 2007	Mount Lemmon	Mount Lemmon Survey	·	2.0 km	MPC · JPL
507555	2012 YR_{5}	—	December 23, 2012	Mount Lemmon	Mount Lemmon Survey	·	1.4 km	MPC · JPL
507556	2012 YV_{9}	—	January 19, 1996	Kitt Peak	Spacewatch	·	2.3 km	MPC · JPL
507557	2013 AF_{20}	—	December 13, 2012	Catalina	CSS	T_{j} (2.92)	2.0 km	MPC · JPL
507558	2013 AW_{22}	—	December 21, 2012	Mount Lemmon	Mount Lemmon Survey	(7605)	4.0 km	MPC · JPL
507559	2013 AM_{27}	—	April 30, 2011	Haleakala	Pan-STARRS 1	H	460 m	MPC · JPL
507560	2013 AH_{37}	—	September 27, 2011	Mount Lemmon	Mount Lemmon Survey	VER	2.6 km	MPC · JPL
507561	2013 AL_{39}	—	November 18, 2007	Mount Lemmon	Mount Lemmon Survey	H	440 m	MPC · JPL
507562	2013 AE_{43}	—	December 13, 2006	Mount Lemmon	Mount Lemmon Survey	LUT	3.6 km	MPC · JPL
507563	2013 AV_{45}	—	January 5, 2013	Mount Lemmon	Mount Lemmon Survey	CYB	3.2 km	MPC · JPL
507564	2013 AZ_{61}	—	February 26, 2008	Mount Lemmon	Mount Lemmon Survey	·	2.7 km	MPC · JPL
507565	2013 AY_{63}	—	December 20, 2012	Catalina	CSS	H	500 m	MPC · JPL
507566	2013 AL_{69}	—	January 6, 2013	Kitt Peak	Spacewatch	H	500 m	MPC · JPL
507567	2013 AX_{74}	—	December 22, 2012	Haleakala	Pan-STARRS 1	·	3.0 km	MPC · JPL
507568	2013 AB_{77}	—	December 9, 2012	Kitt Peak	Spacewatch	·	2.6 km	MPC · JPL
507569	2013 AC_{99}	—	March 3, 2008	Catalina	CSS	·	2.4 km	MPC · JPL
507570	2013 AP_{99}	—	December 12, 2012	Mount Lemmon	Mount Lemmon Survey	·	2.9 km	MPC · JPL
507571	2013 AL_{100}	—	November 13, 2012	Mount Lemmon	Mount Lemmon Survey	·	2.3 km	MPC · JPL
507572	2013 AC_{108}	—	January 4, 2013	Kitt Peak	Spacewatch	·	3.0 km	MPC · JPL
507573	2013 AT_{109}	—	October 23, 2011	Mount Lemmon	Mount Lemmon Survey	·	2.7 km	MPC · JPL
507574	2013 AN_{117}	—	September 23, 2011	Haleakala	Pan-STARRS 1	HYG	2.3 km	MPC · JPL
507575	2013 AM_{126}	—	September 19, 2011	Haleakala	Pan-STARRS 1	·	2.7 km	MPC · JPL
507576	2013 AK_{127}	—	November 11, 2006	Kitt Peak	Spacewatch	THM	1.9 km	MPC · JPL
507577	2013 AE_{152}	—	September 2, 2010	Mount Lemmon	Mount Lemmon Survey	·	2.7 km	MPC · JPL
507578	2013 AP_{155}	—	September 23, 2011	Kitt Peak	Spacewatch	·	2.2 km	MPC · JPL
507579	2013 AB_{156}	—	December 11, 2004	Socorro	LINEAR	H	500 m	MPC · JPL
507580	2013 AB_{158}	—	October 20, 2006	Kitt Peak	Spacewatch	·	1.2 km	MPC · JPL
507581	2013 AJ_{158}	—	February 9, 2008	Kitt Peak	Spacewatch	·	2.0 km	MPC · JPL
507582	2013 AY_{171}	—	September 30, 2005	Kitt Peak	Spacewatch	·	2.3 km	MPC · JPL
507583	2013 AY_{173}	—	September 29, 2011	Mount Lemmon	Mount Lemmon Survey	·	2.3 km	MPC · JPL
507584	2013 AS_{175}	—	April 11, 2008	Mount Lemmon	Mount Lemmon Survey	·	2.0 km	MPC · JPL
507585	2013 BP_{8}	—	February 27, 2008	Mount Lemmon	Mount Lemmon Survey	·	1.7 km	MPC · JPL
507586	2013 BM_{9}	—	October 21, 2012	Mount Lemmon	Mount Lemmon Survey	·	2.9 km	MPC · JPL
507587	2013 BN_{22}	—	September 4, 2011	Haleakala	Pan-STARRS 1	·	2.4 km	MPC · JPL
507588	2013 BW_{31}	—	August 21, 2003	Campo Imperatore	CINEOS	H	540 m	MPC · JPL
507589	2013 BF_{35}	—	January 17, 2013	Haleakala	Pan-STARRS 1	H	600 m	MPC · JPL
507590	2013 BP_{37}	—	January 10, 2007	Mount Lemmon	Mount Lemmon Survey	·	2.5 km	MPC · JPL
507591	2013 BY_{39}	—	January 7, 2013	Kitt Peak	Spacewatch	VER	2.7 km	MPC · JPL
507592	2013 BV_{44}	—	January 17, 2013	Kitt Peak	Spacewatch	H	450 m	MPC · JPL
507593	2013 BT_{48}	—	February 10, 2008	Mount Lemmon	Mount Lemmon Survey	·	2.2 km	MPC · JPL
507594	2013 BD_{65}	—	January 10, 2013	Haleakala	Pan-STARRS 1	·	2.7 km	MPC · JPL
507595	2013 BJ_{68}	—	December 21, 2006	Kitt Peak	Spacewatch	·	2.6 km	MPC · JPL
507596	2013 BY_{73}	—	January 21, 2013	Catalina	CSS	H	590 m	MPC · JPL
507597	2013 BA_{78}	—	February 28, 2008	Catalina	CSS	H	530 m	MPC · JPL
507598	2013 BU_{78}	—	December 20, 2006	Catalina	CSS	·	3.7 km	MPC · JPL
507599	2013 CY_{5}	—	January 10, 2013	Haleakala	Pan-STARRS 1	·	2.9 km	MPC · JPL
507600	2013 CJ_{13}	—	December 21, 2012	Mount Lemmon	Mount Lemmon Survey	LIX	3.5 km	MPC · JPL

== 507601–507700 ==
back to top

Designation			Discovery			Properties		Ref
Permanent	Provisional	Named after	Date	Site	Discoverer(s)	Category	Diam.	Ref
507601	2013 CH_{16}	—	January 19, 2013	Kitt Peak	Spacewatch	·	3.0 km	MPC · JPL
507602	2013 CQ_{20}	—	October 24, 2011	Haleakala	Pan-STARRS 1	CYB	3.0 km	MPC · JPL
507603	2013 CW_{25}	—	October 8, 2005	Kitt Peak	Spacewatch	·	2.4 km	MPC · JPL
507604	2013 CM_{28}	—	January 10, 2013	Haleakala	Pan-STARRS 1	T_{j} (2.93)	3.4 km	MPC · JPL
507605	2013 CE_{35}	—	November 19, 2006	Kitt Peak	Spacewatch	LIX	4.1 km	MPC · JPL
507606	2013 CS_{55}	—	April 29, 2008	Mount Lemmon	Mount Lemmon Survey	TIR	2.2 km	MPC · JPL
507607	2013 CQ_{56}	—	October 18, 2000	Kitt Peak	Spacewatch	·	1.9 km	MPC · JPL
507608	2013 CV_{78}	—	September 24, 2011	Haleakala	Pan-STARRS 1	·	2.3 km	MPC · JPL
507609	2013 CL_{81}	—	August 28, 2005	Kitt Peak	Spacewatch	·	2.6 km	MPC · JPL
507610	2013 CV_{90}	—	January 19, 2013	Kitt Peak	Spacewatch	H	350 m	MPC · JPL
507611	2013 CA_{118}	—	November 18, 2006	Catalina	CSS	·	2.1 km	MPC · JPL
507612	2013 CX_{127}	—	June 2, 2011	Haleakala	Pan-STARRS 1	H	570 m	MPC · JPL
507613	2013 CQ_{153}	—	August 29, 2005	Anderson Mesa	LONEOS	·	3.6 km	MPC · JPL
507614	2013 CC_{183}	—	April 29, 2008	Mount Lemmon	Mount Lemmon Survey	·	3.0 km	MPC · JPL
507615	2013 CV_{190}	—	September 24, 2011	Haleakala	Pan-STARRS 1	·	2.7 km	MPC · JPL
507616	2013 CZ_{205}	—	September 24, 2011	Haleakala	Pan-STARRS 1	·	2.2 km	MPC · JPL
507617	2013 CL_{210}	—	October 9, 2005	Kitt Peak	Spacewatch	HYG	2.2 km	MPC · JPL
507618	2013 DM_{4}	—	August 21, 2008	Kitt Peak	Spacewatch	3:2	6.9 km	MPC · JPL
507619	2013 ED_{21}	—	September 10, 2004	Kitt Peak	Spacewatch	CYB	3.2 km	MPC · JPL
507620	2013 FP_{1}	—	October 22, 2005	Kitt Peak	Spacewatch	URS	3.0 km	MPC · JPL
507621	2013 FM_{2}	—	January 19, 2013	Mount Lemmon	Mount Lemmon Survey	H	500 m	MPC · JPL
507622	2013 FK_{15}	—	January 17, 2007	Kitt Peak	Spacewatch	THM	2.3 km	MPC · JPL
507623	2013 GE_{17}	—	October 1, 2005	Mount Lemmon	Mount Lemmon Survey	·	2.3 km	MPC · JPL
507624	2013 GX_{19}	—	December 7, 2001	Socorro	LINEAR	H	570 m	MPC · JPL
507625	2013 GS_{29}	—	March 19, 2013	Haleakala	Pan-STARRS 1	·	610 m	MPC · JPL
507626	2013 GC_{69}	—	April 12, 2013	Haleakala	Pan-STARRS 1	H	610 m	MPC · JPL
507627	2013 GJ_{97}	—	March 5, 2013	Haleakala	Pan-STARRS 1	HYG	3.3 km	MPC · JPL
507628	2013 GG_{113}	—	April 13, 2013	Haleakala	Pan-STARRS 1	THB	2.9 km	MPC · JPL
507629	2013 GM_{115}	—	March 18, 2013	Kitt Peak	Spacewatch	·	600 m	MPC · JPL
507630	2013 HY_{84}	—	December 29, 2011	Kitt Peak	Spacewatch	·	2.5 km	MPC · JPL
507631	2013 HK_{101}	—	October 25, 2011	Haleakala	Pan-STARRS 1	·	700 m	MPC · JPL
507632	2013 JA_{7}	—	April 1, 2013	Mount Lemmon	Mount Lemmon Survey	H	590 m	MPC · JPL
507633	2013 JZ_{7}	—	October 15, 2007	Kitt Peak	Spacewatch	·	670 m	MPC · JPL
507634	2013 JR_{41}	—	May 6, 2002	Kitt Peak	Spacewatch	·	3.2 km	MPC · JPL
507635	2013 JS_{52}	—	November 24, 2003	Kitt Peak	Spacewatch	H	520 m	MPC · JPL
507636	2013 KZ_{4}	—	November 4, 2010	Mount Lemmon	Mount Lemmon Survey	·	610 m	MPC · JPL
507637	2013 KG_{7}	—	February 14, 2013	Haleakala	Pan-STARRS 1	PHO	950 m	MPC · JPL
507638	2013 KD_{13}	—	May 8, 2013	Haleakala	Pan-STARRS 1	·	560 m	MPC · JPL
507639	2013 LU_{34}	—	November 4, 2010	Mount Lemmon	Mount Lemmon Survey	·	660 m	MPC · JPL
507640	2013 MP_{1}	—	October 24, 2009	Mount Lemmon	Mount Lemmon Survey	3:2	5.0 km	MPC · JPL
507641	2013 NP_{2}	—	July 1, 2013	Haleakala	Pan-STARRS 1	·	700 m	MPC · JPL
507642	2013 NE_{7}	—	July 2, 2013	Haleakala	Pan-STARRS 1	·	630 m	MPC · JPL
507643	2013 NF_{12}	—	October 11, 2010	Mount Lemmon	Mount Lemmon Survey	·	710 m	MPC · JPL
507644	2013 NN_{12}	—	November 2, 2007	Kitt Peak	Spacewatch	·	690 m	MPC · JPL
507645	2013 NH_{17}	—	September 20, 2006	Catalina	CSS	·	780 m	MPC · JPL
507646	2013 OY	—	January 19, 2012	Haleakala	Pan-STARRS 1	V	480 m	MPC · JPL
507647	2013 OV_{11}	—	September 9, 2004	Socorro	LINEAR	MIS	2.4 km	MPC · JPL
507648	2013 PQ_{4}	—	September 15, 2010	Mount Lemmon	Mount Lemmon Survey	·	580 m	MPC · JPL
507649	2013 PY_{5}	—	November 3, 2010	Mount Lemmon	Mount Lemmon Survey	·	660 m	MPC · JPL
507650	2013 PB_{18}	—	April 22, 2009	Mount Lemmon	Mount Lemmon Survey	·	570 m	MPC · JPL
507651	2013 PH_{27}	—	February 25, 2012	Mount Lemmon	Mount Lemmon Survey	·	720 m	MPC · JPL
507652	2013 PA_{37}	—	January 3, 2012	Mount Lemmon	Mount Lemmon Survey	·	650 m	MPC · JPL
507653	2013 PK_{42}	—	August 9, 2013	Kitt Peak	Spacewatch	·	950 m	MPC · JPL
507654	2013 PW_{44}	—	November 1, 2010	Mount Lemmon	Mount Lemmon Survey	·	720 m	MPC · JPL
507655	2013 PG_{61}	—	July 16, 2013	Haleakala	Pan-STARRS 1	·	810 m	MPC · JPL
507656	2013 PN_{71}	—	October 2, 2003	Kitt Peak	Spacewatch	BAP	780 m	MPC · JPL
507657	2013 QV_{9}	—	December 13, 2006	Kitt Peak	Spacewatch	NYS	870 m	MPC · JPL
507658	2013 QX_{16}	—	September 27, 2006	Mount Lemmon	Mount Lemmon Survey	·	1.2 km	MPC · JPL
507659	2013 QZ_{35}	—	August 12, 2013	Kitt Peak	Spacewatch	·	970 m	MPC · JPL
507660	2013 QH_{83}	—	June 16, 2013	Mount Lemmon	Mount Lemmon Survey	·	1.1 km	MPC · JPL
507661	2013 QF_{92}	—	November 6, 2010	Kitt Peak	Spacewatch	·	650 m	MPC · JPL
507662	2013 RZ_{12}	—	January 10, 2011	Mount Lemmon	Mount Lemmon Survey	·	1.2 km	MPC · JPL
507663	2013 RM_{18}	—	November 15, 2006	Kitt Peak	Spacewatch	·	920 m	MPC · JPL
507664	2013 RM_{22}	—	February 23, 2012	Mount Lemmon	Mount Lemmon Survey	·	1.1 km	MPC · JPL
507665	2013 RA_{27}	—	November 14, 2006	Kitt Peak	Spacewatch	·	1.0 km	MPC · JPL
507666	2013 RF_{41}	—	February 5, 2011	Haleakala	Pan-STARRS 1	·	930 m	MPC · JPL
507667	2013 RZ_{41}	—	April 14, 2007	Kitt Peak	Spacewatch	HNS	1.2 km	MPC · JPL
507668	2013 RD_{68}	—	January 19, 2012	Haleakala	Pan-STARRS 1	·	1 km	MPC · JPL
507669	2013 RF_{91}	—	August 1, 2009	Kitt Peak	Spacewatch	NYS	760 m	MPC · JPL
507670	2013 RW_{91}	—	September 14, 2013	Kitt Peak	Spacewatch	CLA	1.3 km	MPC · JPL
507671	2013 RC_{93}	—	October 24, 1998	Kitt Peak	Spacewatch	·	1.2 km	MPC · JPL
507672	2013 RK_{99}	—	September 28, 2009	Kitt Peak	Spacewatch	·	990 m	MPC · JPL
507673	2013 RR_{100}	—	September 21, 2009	Mount Lemmon	Mount Lemmon Survey	·	1.6 km	MPC · JPL
507674	2013 RZ_{100}	—	November 25, 2005	Mount Lemmon	Mount Lemmon Survey	·	740 m	MPC · JPL
507675	2013 SY_{22}	—	March 2, 2011	Mount Lemmon	Mount Lemmon Survey	V	630 m	MPC · JPL
507676	2013 SL_{23}	—	February 13, 2011	Mount Lemmon	Mount Lemmon Survey	MAS	630 m	MPC · JPL
507677	2013 SG_{26}	—	December 24, 2006	Kitt Peak	Spacewatch	NYS	1.2 km	MPC · JPL
507678	2013 SX_{35}	—	April 2, 2005	Mount Lemmon	Mount Lemmon Survey	·	790 m	MPC · JPL
507679	2013 SW_{43}	—	November 17, 2009	Catalina	CSS	·	1.2 km	MPC · JPL
507680	2013 SK_{51}	—	January 30, 2011	Kitt Peak	Spacewatch	NYS	1.1 km	MPC · JPL
507681	2013 SE_{53}	—	November 22, 2006	Kitt Peak	Spacewatch	MAS	610 m	MPC · JPL
507682	2013 SF_{54}	—	September 1, 2013	Mount Lemmon	Mount Lemmon Survey	·	950 m	MPC · JPL
507683	2013 SA_{62}	—	February 8, 2011	Mount Lemmon	Mount Lemmon Survey	·	930 m	MPC · JPL
507684	2013 SD_{62}	—	September 9, 2013	Haleakala	Pan-STARRS 1	NYS	950 m	MPC · JPL
507685	2013 SS_{79}	—	September 15, 2006	Kitt Peak	Spacewatch	·	630 m	MPC · JPL
507686	2013 SL_{80}	—	March 9, 2011	Mount Lemmon	Mount Lemmon Survey	HNS	1.2 km	MPC · JPL
507687	2013 SK_{84}	—	December 24, 2006	Catalina	CSS	·	960 m	MPC · JPL
507688	2013 SQ_{84}	—	January 14, 2011	Mount Lemmon	Mount Lemmon Survey	·	1.2 km	MPC · JPL
507689	2013 SG_{100}	—	September 26, 2013	Mount Lemmon	Mount Lemmon Survey	EUN	800 m	MPC · JPL
507690	2013 TM_{9}	—	March 27, 2008	Kitt Peak	Spacewatch	·	1.3 km	MPC · JPL
507691	2013 TV_{10}	—	October 1, 2013	Kitt Peak	Spacewatch	·	1.2 km	MPC · JPL
507692	2013 TC_{12}	—	March 28, 2008	Mount Lemmon	Mount Lemmon Survey	V	480 m	MPC · JPL
507693	2013 TE_{13}	—	July 28, 2009	Kitt Peak	Spacewatch	NYS	980 m	MPC · JPL
507694	2013 TZ_{18}	—	August 1, 2009	Kitt Peak	Spacewatch	·	980 m	MPC · JPL
507695	2013 TM_{28}	—	August 27, 2009	Catalina	CSS	·	1.2 km	MPC · JPL
507696	2013 TO_{44}	—	April 14, 2012	Haleakala	Pan-STARRS 1	MAS	630 m	MPC · JPL
507697	2013 TU_{46}	—	September 17, 2009	Kitt Peak	Spacewatch	·	1.2 km	MPC · JPL
507698	2013 TE_{50}	—	September 17, 2009	Kitt Peak	Spacewatch	MAS	550 m	MPC · JPL
507699	2013 TD_{67}	—	January 1, 2012	Mount Lemmon	Mount Lemmon Survey	·	790 m	MPC · JPL
507700	2013 TJ_{72}	—	July 27, 2009	Kitt Peak	Spacewatch	·	1.0 km	MPC · JPL

== 507701–507800 ==
back to top

Designation			Discovery			Properties		Ref
Permanent	Provisional	Named after	Date	Site	Discoverer(s)	Category	Diam.	Ref
507701	2013 TH_{80}	—	August 18, 2009	Kitt Peak	Spacewatch	·	920 m	MPC · JPL
507702	2013 TY_{82}	—	August 17, 2009	Kitt Peak	Spacewatch	·	930 m	MPC · JPL
507703	2013 TB_{91}	—	September 19, 2006	Kitt Peak	Spacewatch	·	670 m	MPC · JPL
507704	2013 TB_{94}	—	October 1, 2013	Kitt Peak	Spacewatch	EUN	1.2 km	MPC · JPL
507705	2013 TD_{94}	—	September 19, 2009	Mount Lemmon	Mount Lemmon Survey	·	980 m	MPC · JPL
507706	2013 TH_{108}	—	August 18, 2009	Kitt Peak	Spacewatch	MAS	610 m	MPC · JPL
507707	2013 TK_{108}	—	April 22, 2007	Kitt Peak	Spacewatch	·	2.0 km	MPC · JPL
507708	2013 TP_{128}	—	February 27, 2012	Haleakala	Pan-STARRS 1	·	1.6 km	MPC · JPL
507709	2013 TV_{128}	—	November 12, 2006	Catalina	CSS	·	1.1 km	MPC · JPL
507710	2013 TU_{136}	—	March 16, 2012	Haleakala	Pan-STARRS 1	BAR	1.0 km	MPC · JPL
507711	2013 TR_{139}	—	September 3, 2013	Mount Lemmon	Mount Lemmon Survey	MAS	580 m	MPC · JPL
507712	2013 TX_{140}	—	March 4, 2011	Mount Lemmon	Mount Lemmon Survey	·	940 m	MPC · JPL
507713	2013 TU_{161}	—	March 29, 2003	Anderson Mesa	LONEOS	EUN	1.4 km	MPC · JPL
507714	2013 UN	—	June 11, 2004	Kitt Peak	Spacewatch	·	1.3 km	MPC · JPL
507715	2013 UE_{8}	—	February 23, 2007	Mount Lemmon	Mount Lemmon Survey	·	820 m	MPC · JPL
507716	2013 UP_{8}	—	October 25, 2013	Haleakala	Pan-STARRS 1	T_{j} (2.79) · APO +1km · PHA	1.9 km	MPC · JPL
507717	2013 UL_{11}	—	March 30, 2011	Mount Lemmon	Mount Lemmon Survey	·	960 m	MPC · JPL
507718	2013 US_{16}	—	July 14, 2004	Siding Spring	SSS	EUN	1.4 km	MPC · JPL
507719	2013 UT_{16}	—	March 11, 2011	Mount Lemmon	Mount Lemmon Survey	·	1.3 km	MPC · JPL
507720	2013 UV_{16}	—	November 4, 2004	Catalina	CSS	·	2.5 km	MPC · JPL
507721	2013 VK_{4}	—	July 13, 2013	Haleakala	Pan-STARRS 1	·	1.9 km	MPC · JPL
507722	2013 VE_{14}	—	October 14, 2013	Kitt Peak	Spacewatch	·	1.3 km	MPC · JPL
507723	2013 VX_{17}	—	July 14, 2013	Haleakala	Pan-STARRS 1	(5)	1.2 km	MPC · JPL
507724	2013 VU_{24}	—	December 28, 2005	Kitt Peak	Spacewatch	(5)	1.1 km	MPC · JPL
507725	2013 VD_{25}	—	November 12, 2013	Mount Lemmon	Mount Lemmon Survey	·	2.3 km	MPC · JPL
507726	2013 WX_{12}	—	September 7, 2004	Kitt Peak	Spacewatch	·	1.1 km	MPC · JPL
507727	2013 WF_{22}	—	January 12, 2010	Catalina	CSS	·	2.1 km	MPC · JPL
507728	2013 WZ_{47}	—	July 14, 2013	Haleakala	Pan-STARRS 1	WAT	1.8 km	MPC · JPL
507729	2013 WL_{53}	—	October 28, 2013	Mount Lemmon	Mount Lemmon Survey	·	1.6 km	MPC · JPL
507730	2013 WA_{58}	—	April 3, 2011	Haleakala	Pan-STARRS 1	·	1.7 km	MPC · JPL
507731	2013 WG_{61}	—	November 2, 2013	Catalina	CSS	BAR	990 m	MPC · JPL
507732	2013 WC_{66}	—	September 12, 2013	Mount Lemmon	Mount Lemmon Survey	·	1.1 km	MPC · JPL
507733	2013 WH_{69}	—	September 28, 2009	Mount Lemmon	Mount Lemmon Survey	V	720 m	MPC · JPL
507734	2013 WB_{70}	—	November 9, 2009	Kitt Peak	Spacewatch	·	800 m	MPC · JPL
507735	2013 WM_{97}	—	November 28, 2013	Mount Lemmon	Mount Lemmon Survey	(194)	1.3 km	MPC · JPL
507736	2013 WO_{110}	—	November 25, 2013	Haleakala	Pan-STARRS 1	HNS	1.7 km	MPC · JPL
507737	2013 WQ_{110}	—	November 28, 2013	Kitt Peak	Spacewatch	·	2.6 km	MPC · JPL
507738	2013 XP	—	January 24, 2006	Catalina	CSS	·	1.8 km	MPC · JPL
507739	2013 XR_{10}	—	November 1, 2013	Kitt Peak	Spacewatch	MAR	1.3 km	MPC · JPL
507740	2013 XO_{11}	—	October 6, 1996	Kitt Peak	Spacewatch	(5)	1.1 km	MPC · JPL
507741	2013 XN_{13}	—	December 4, 2005	Kitt Peak	Spacewatch	·	900 m	MPC · JPL
507742	2013 XD_{15}	—	November 12, 2013	Mount Lemmon	Mount Lemmon Survey	·	1.3 km	MPC · JPL
507743	2013 XU_{17}	—	November 24, 2003	Kitt Peak	Spacewatch	BRA	1.5 km	MPC · JPL
507744	2013 XL_{24}	—	February 15, 2010	Catalina	CSS	EUN	1.2 km	MPC · JPL
507745	2013 YW_{9}	—	December 24, 2013	Mount Lemmon	Mount Lemmon Survey	HNS	1.1 km	MPC · JPL
507746	2013 YP_{11}	—	April 2, 2006	Kitt Peak	Spacewatch	·	1.3 km	MPC · JPL
507747	2013 YG_{13}	—	January 10, 2010	Mount Lemmon	Mount Lemmon Survey	KON	2.0 km	MPC · JPL
507748	2013 YB_{15}	—	November 28, 2013	Mount Lemmon	Mount Lemmon Survey	·	1.3 km	MPC · JPL
507749	2013 YF_{17}	—	December 24, 2013	Mount Lemmon	Mount Lemmon Survey	·	1.6 km	MPC · JPL
507750	2013 YT_{17}	—	October 7, 2012	Haleakala	Pan-STARRS 1	·	2.2 km	MPC · JPL
507751	2013 YP_{20}	—	December 26, 2013	Mount Lemmon	Mount Lemmon Survey	CYB	4.1 km	MPC · JPL
507752	2013 YY_{26}	—	April 26, 2006	Kitt Peak	Spacewatch	MIS	2.6 km	MPC · JPL
507753	2013 YH_{30}	—	January 20, 2009	Mount Lemmon	Mount Lemmon Survey	·	1.7 km	MPC · JPL
507754	2013 YS_{31}	—	October 9, 2008	Kitt Peak	Spacewatch	·	1.2 km	MPC · JPL
507755	2013 YN_{42}	—	November 28, 2013	Mount Lemmon	Mount Lemmon Survey	·	2.3 km	MPC · JPL
507756	2013 YG_{53}	—	November 9, 2013	Mount Lemmon	Mount Lemmon Survey	·	1.7 km	MPC · JPL
507757	2013 YC_{55}	—	December 25, 2013	Mount Lemmon	Mount Lemmon Survey	PAD	1.3 km	MPC · JPL
507758	2013 YG_{66}	—	May 25, 2010	WISE	WISE	·	1.8 km	MPC · JPL
507759	2013 YK_{69}	—	November 28, 2013	Mount Lemmon	Mount Lemmon Survey	·	1.6 km	MPC · JPL
507760	2013 YY_{71}	—	November 12, 2013	Mount Lemmon	Mount Lemmon Survey	·	1.0 km	MPC · JPL
507761	2013 YX_{74}	—	November 11, 2004	Kitt Peak	Spacewatch	·	1.3 km	MPC · JPL
507762	2013 YK_{88}	—	October 15, 2012	Haleakala	Pan-STARRS 1	HOF	2.8 km	MPC · JPL
507763	2013 YN_{89}	—	November 21, 2009	Kitt Peak	Spacewatch	·	1.6 km	MPC · JPL
507764	2013 YD_{93}	—	May 8, 2006	Mount Lemmon	Mount Lemmon Survey	·	2.3 km	MPC · JPL
507765	2013 YR_{101}	—	September 22, 2008	Kitt Peak	Spacewatch	·	1.5 km	MPC · JPL
507766	2013 YK_{102}	—	December 26, 2013	Mount Lemmon	Mount Lemmon Survey	AGN	1.1 km	MPC · JPL
507767	2013 YG_{103}	—	September 14, 2007	Kitt Peak	Spacewatch	·	1.9 km	MPC · JPL
507768	2013 YW_{105}	—	December 11, 2013	Haleakala	Pan-STARRS 1	·	1.7 km	MPC · JPL
507769	2013 YJ_{106}	—	December 11, 2004	Kitt Peak	Spacewatch	EUN	1.0 km	MPC · JPL
507770	2013 YT_{107}	—	January 21, 2006	Kitt Peak	Spacewatch	·	1.2 km	MPC · JPL
507771	2013 YK_{109}	—	December 24, 2013	Mount Lemmon	Mount Lemmon Survey	·	1.8 km	MPC · JPL
507772	2013 YH_{113}	—	December 11, 2013	Mount Lemmon	Mount Lemmon Survey	·	1.7 km	MPC · JPL
507773	2013 YR_{116}	—	December 30, 2013	Mount Lemmon	Mount Lemmon Survey	·	2.6 km	MPC · JPL
507774	2013 YC_{123}	—	December 24, 2013	Mount Lemmon	Mount Lemmon Survey	HNS	1.1 km	MPC · JPL
507775	2013 YN_{130}	—	December 31, 2013	Mount Lemmon	Mount Lemmon Survey	·	2.1 km	MPC · JPL
507776	2013 YQ_{132}	—	March 16, 2010	Mount Lemmon	Mount Lemmon Survey	·	1.6 km	MPC · JPL
507777	2013 YX_{151}	—	September 4, 2007	Mount Lemmon	Mount Lemmon Survey	KOR	1.2 km	MPC · JPL
507778	2013 YY_{151}	—	October 1, 2008	Kitt Peak	Spacewatch	·	1.3 km	MPC · JPL
507779	2013 YZ_{151}	—	September 25, 2012	Mount Lemmon	Mount Lemmon Survey	·	1.4 km	MPC · JPL
507780	2014 AE_{8}	—	December 11, 2004	Kitt Peak	Spacewatch	·	1.5 km	MPC · JPL
507781	2014 AF_{12}	—	April 19, 2010	WISE	WISE	·	2.5 km	MPC · JPL
507782	2014 AF_{14}	—	January 1, 2014	Haleakala	Pan-STARRS 1	·	1.8 km	MPC · JPL
507783	2014 AK_{38}	—	January 3, 2014	Mount Lemmon	Mount Lemmon Survey	·	1.6 km	MPC · JPL
507784	2014 AJ_{44}	—	January 19, 2010	WISE	WISE	·	1.8 km	MPC · JPL
507785	2014 AR_{51}	—	March 19, 2010	Catalina	CSS	·	1.7 km	MPC · JPL
507786	2014 AF_{56}	—	April 22, 2010	WISE	WISE	·	3.3 km	MPC · JPL
507787	2014 AT_{56}	—	March 9, 2005	Mount Lemmon	Mount Lemmon Survey	AGN	1.2 km	MPC · JPL
507788	2014 AU_{56}	—	February 19, 2009	Catalina	CSS	·	3.9 km	MPC · JPL
507789	2014 BF_{4}	—	October 8, 2008	Kitt Peak	Spacewatch	·	1.3 km	MPC · JPL
507790	2014 BD_{6}	—	January 13, 2005	Kitt Peak	Spacewatch	·	1.3 km	MPC · JPL
507791	2014 BP_{7}	—	December 30, 2013	Mount Lemmon	Mount Lemmon Survey	MRX	800 m	MPC · JPL
507792	2014 BX_{9}	—	March 17, 2010	Catalina	CSS	JUN	1.1 km	MPC · JPL
507793	2014 BO_{13}	—	January 16, 2005	Kitt Peak	Spacewatch	·	2.0 km	MPC · JPL
507794	2014 BJ_{15}	—	September 29, 2008	Kitt Peak	Spacewatch	JUN	900 m	MPC · JPL
507795	2014 BG_{19}	—	January 5, 2014	Haleakala	Pan-STARRS 1	·	1.4 km	MPC · JPL
507796	2014 BZ_{21}	—	September 4, 2011	Haleakala	Pan-STARRS 1	·	2.5 km	MPC · JPL
507797	2014 BH_{29}	—	January 21, 2014	Mount Lemmon	Mount Lemmon Survey	·	2.1 km	MPC · JPL
507798	2014 BP_{37}	—	October 6, 2012	Haleakala	Pan-STARRS 1	MAR	1.2 km	MPC · JPL
507799	2014 BV_{57}	—	September 23, 2000	Socorro	LINEAR	·	1.4 km	MPC · JPL
507800	2014 BR_{60}	—	April 20, 2010	Mount Lemmon	Mount Lemmon Survey	MRX	1.0 km	MPC · JPL

== 507801–507900 ==
back to top

Designation			Discovery			Properties		Ref
Permanent	Provisional	Named after	Date	Site	Discoverer(s)	Category	Diam.	Ref
507801	2014 BZ_{63}	—	November 1, 2008	Mount Lemmon	Mount Lemmon Survey	MRX	830 m	MPC · JPL
507802	2014 BL_{65}	—	March 8, 2005	Mount Lemmon	Mount Lemmon Survey	HOF	2.1 km	MPC · JPL
507803	2014 BR_{65}	—	February 2, 2009	Kitt Peak	Spacewatch	·	1.9 km	MPC · JPL
507804	2014 CS_{22}	—	December 30, 2013	Mount Lemmon	Mount Lemmon Survey	AEG	2.9 km	MPC · JPL
507805	2014 CY_{22}	—	February 10, 2014	Catalina	CSS	·	2.3 km	MPC · JPL
507806	2014 DF_{4}	—	February 25, 2010	WISE	WISE	·	2.0 km	MPC · JPL
507807	2014 DF_{5}	—	February 10, 2014	Haleakala	Pan-STARRS 1	EOS	1.9 km	MPC · JPL
507808	2014 DH_{9}	—	February 15, 2010	Kitt Peak	Spacewatch	·	1.1 km	MPC · JPL
507809	2014 DB_{14}	—	January 29, 2009	Mount Lemmon	Mount Lemmon Survey	AEG	3.1 km	MPC · JPL
507810	2014 DJ_{21}	—	February 15, 2010	Catalina	CSS	·	2.5 km	MPC · JPL
507811	2014 DG_{30}	—	January 28, 2014	Kitt Peak	Spacewatch	EOS	1.8 km	MPC · JPL
507812	2014 DY_{35}	—	February 22, 2014	Kitt Peak	Spacewatch	·	1.7 km	MPC · JPL
507813	2014 DB_{38}	—	October 8, 2008	Kitt Peak	Spacewatch	(5)	1.2 km	MPC · JPL
507814	2014 DY_{40}	—	October 7, 2008	Mount Lemmon	Mount Lemmon Survey	·	1.2 km	MPC · JPL
507815	2014 DM_{54}	—	March 16, 2004	Kitt Peak	Spacewatch	·	1.5 km	MPC · JPL
507816	2014 DK_{59}	—	February 26, 2014	Haleakala	Pan-STARRS 1	·	2.6 km	MPC · JPL
507817	2014 DF_{73}	—	October 4, 2006	Mount Lemmon	Mount Lemmon Survey	·	2.7 km	MPC · JPL
507818	2014 DQ_{78}	—	September 6, 2008	Mount Lemmon	Mount Lemmon Survey	·	1.2 km	MPC · JPL
507819	2014 DJ_{103}	—	February 10, 2014	Haleakala	Pan-STARRS 1	·	2.5 km	MPC · JPL
507820	2014 DL_{117}	—	February 11, 2008	Mount Lemmon	Mount Lemmon Survey	·	3.1 km	MPC · JPL
507821	2014 DJ_{121}	—	September 4, 2011	Haleakala	Pan-STARRS 1	EOS	1.8 km	MPC · JPL
507822	2014 DF_{123}	—	September 18, 2011	Mount Lemmon	Mount Lemmon Survey	·	1.6 km	MPC · JPL
507823	2014 DD_{126}	—	February 9, 2014	Kitt Peak	Spacewatch	EOS	1.9 km	MPC · JPL
507824	2014 DP_{134}	—	February 7, 2008	Mount Lemmon	Mount Lemmon Survey	·	2.5 km	MPC · JPL
507825	2014 DO_{142}	—	January 13, 2010	WISE	WISE	·	2.2 km	MPC · JPL
507826	2014 DT_{145}	—	August 31, 2007	Siding Spring	K. Sárneczky, L. Kiss	·	2.2 km	MPC · JPL
507827	2014 DV_{145}	—	October 9, 2007	Kitt Peak	Spacewatch	AGN	990 m	MPC · JPL
507828	2014 DE_{146}	—	December 4, 2007	Kitt Peak	Spacewatch	·	2.9 km	MPC · JPL
507829	2014 EC_{3}	—	February 9, 2014	Haleakala	Pan-STARRS 1	EOS	2.2 km	MPC · JPL
507830	2014 EP_{10}	—	March 18, 2009	Kitt Peak	Spacewatch	·	2.0 km	MPC · JPL
507831	2014 EM_{31}	—	February 26, 2014	Haleakala	Pan-STARRS 1	·	1.8 km	MPC · JPL
507832	2014 EQ_{31}	—	June 13, 2010	WISE	WISE	EUP	4.1 km	MPC · JPL
507833	2014 EB_{32}	—	October 24, 2011	Haleakala	Pan-STARRS 1	THB	3.8 km	MPC · JPL
507834	2014 EX_{41}	—	December 2, 2010	Kitt Peak	Spacewatch	L4	8.6 km	MPC · JPL
507835	2014 EG_{42}	—	February 17, 2004	Kitt Peak	Spacewatch	·	1.7 km	MPC · JPL
507836	2014 ET_{45}	—	October 18, 2012	Haleakala	Pan-STARRS 1	·	1.8 km	MPC · JPL
507837	2014 FT_{3}	—	February 28, 2014	Mount Lemmon	Mount Lemmon Survey	·	2.8 km	MPC · JPL
507838	2014 FE_{14}	—	April 24, 2006	Kitt Peak	Spacewatch	·	1.9 km	MPC · JPL
507839	2014 FM_{14}	—	December 4, 2013	Haleakala	Pan-STARRS 1	HNS	1.3 km	MPC · JPL
507840	2014 FT_{14}	—	March 8, 2014	Mount Lemmon	Mount Lemmon Survey	·	2.9 km	MPC · JPL
507841	2014 FA_{22}	—	August 30, 2011	Haleakala	Pan-STARRS 1	·	1.7 km	MPC · JPL
507842	2014 FT_{23}	—	August 20, 2011	Haleakala	Pan-STARRS 1	·	2.5 km	MPC · JPL
507843	2014 FA_{27}	—	December 30, 2007	Mount Lemmon	Mount Lemmon Survey	HYG	2.8 km	MPC · JPL
507844	2014 FQ_{53}	—	November 18, 2007	Mount Lemmon	Mount Lemmon Survey	·	2.3 km	MPC · JPL
507845	2014 FM_{73}	—	October 25, 2011	Haleakala	Pan-STARRS 1	EOS	2.3 km	MPC · JPL
507846	2014 FN_{73}	—	October 7, 2005	Mount Lemmon	Mount Lemmon Survey	·	3.0 km	MPC · JPL
507847	2014 GM_{1}	—	May 31, 2006	Mount Lemmon	Mount Lemmon Survey	AMO +1km	1.1 km	MPC · JPL
507848	2014 GV_{6}	—	March 27, 2003	Kitt Peak	Spacewatch	·	3.0 km	MPC · JPL
507849	2014 GX_{6}	—	September 24, 2011	Mount Lemmon	Mount Lemmon Survey	·	2.7 km	MPC · JPL
507850	2014 GY_{15}	—	February 28, 2014	Haleakala	Pan-STARRS 1	·	2.0 km	MPC · JPL
507851	2014 GX_{35}	—	May 1, 2010	WISE	WISE	·	3.2 km	MPC · JPL
507852	2014 GD_{44}	—	February 10, 2014	Haleakala	Pan-STARRS 1	·	2.2 km	MPC · JPL
507853	2014 GB_{46}	—	October 26, 2011	Haleakala	Pan-STARRS 1	URS	4.2 km	MPC · JPL
507854	2014 HL_{10}	—	April 20, 2014	Mount Lemmon	Mount Lemmon Survey	·	2.4 km	MPC · JPL
507855	2014 HE_{11}	—	March 10, 2003	Kitt Peak	Spacewatch	·	3.7 km	MPC · JPL
507856	2014 HQ_{137}	—	March 9, 2008	Mount Lemmon	Mount Lemmon Survey	·	2.3 km	MPC · JPL
507857	2014 HC_{139}	—	October 19, 2010	Mount Lemmon	Mount Lemmon Survey	CYB	4.0 km	MPC · JPL
507858	2014 HM_{147}	—	October 7, 2005	Mount Lemmon	Mount Lemmon Survey	·	2.5 km	MPC · JPL
507859	2014 HP_{150}	—	February 26, 2014	Haleakala	Pan-STARRS 1	·	1.5 km	MPC · JPL
507860	2014 HX_{150}	—	February 28, 2014	Haleakala	Pan-STARRS 1	·	3.1 km	MPC · JPL
507861	2014 HM_{154}	—	October 19, 2011	Mount Lemmon	Mount Lemmon Survey	·	3.4 km	MPC · JPL
507862	2014 HN_{168}	—	October 17, 2011	Kitt Peak	Spacewatch	·	3.4 km	MPC · JPL
507863	2014 HU_{182}	—	February 8, 2013	Haleakala	Pan-STARRS 1	LUT	3.8 km	MPC · JPL
507864	2014 HS_{183}	—	October 21, 2006	Mount Lemmon	Mount Lemmon Survey	·	2.5 km	MPC · JPL
507865	2014 HU_{184}	—	December 13, 2012	Mount Lemmon	Mount Lemmon Survey	·	3.0 km	MPC · JPL
507866	2014 JF_{9}	—	April 14, 2008	Mount Lemmon	Mount Lemmon Survey	·	2.6 km	MPC · JPL
507867	2014 JJ_{15}	—	December 4, 2005	Kitt Peak	Spacewatch	H	420 m	MPC · JPL
507868	2014 JA_{38}	—	November 17, 2011	Kitt Peak	Spacewatch	·	2.8 km	MPC · JPL
507869	2014 JP_{53}	—	September 27, 2011	Mount Lemmon	Mount Lemmon Survey	·	4.0 km	MPC · JPL
507870	2014 JM_{55}	—	September 18, 2012	Mount Lemmon	Mount Lemmon Survey	H	400 m	MPC · JPL
507871	2014 JQ_{76}	—	March 5, 2013	Mount Lemmon	Mount Lemmon Survey	·	3.3 km	MPC · JPL
507872	2014 KF_{7}	—	September 29, 2011	Mount Lemmon	Mount Lemmon Survey	·	2.0 km	MPC · JPL
507873	2014 KU_{19}	—	April 4, 2003	Kitt Peak	Spacewatch	·	2.0 km	MPC · JPL
507874	2014 KN_{25}	—	December 16, 2011	Mount Lemmon	Mount Lemmon Survey	·	2.6 km	MPC · JPL
507875	2014 KR_{38}	—	May 24, 2014	Haleakala	Pan-STARRS 1	H	460 m	MPC · JPL
507876	2014 KK_{43}	—	May 7, 2014	Haleakala	Pan-STARRS 1	·	3.0 km	MPC · JPL
507877	2014 MG_{26}	—	March 20, 2013	Haleakala	Pan-STARRS 1	·	4.1 km	MPC · JPL
507878	2014 MX_{33}	—	December 26, 2011	Kitt Peak	Spacewatch	·	4.2 km	MPC · JPL
507879	2014 MD_{38}	—	June 26, 2014	Haleakala	Pan-STARRS 1	H	690 m	MPC · JPL
507880	2014 MX_{41}	—	March 8, 2005	Catalina	CSS	·	3.1 km	MPC · JPL
507881	2014 MK_{57}	—	June 27, 2014	Haleakala	Pan-STARRS 1	H	420 m	MPC · JPL
507882	2014 NQ_{47}	—	June 3, 2014	Haleakala	Pan-STARRS 1	H	520 m	MPC · JPL
507883	2014 OO_{193}	—	July 27, 2014	Haleakala	Pan-STARRS 1	H	530 m	MPC · JPL
507884	2014 OJ_{244}	—	September 23, 2011	Haleakala	Pan-STARRS 1	·	560 m	MPC · JPL
507885	2014 OO_{344}	—	June 27, 2014	Haleakala	Pan-STARRS 1	H	440 m	MPC · JPL
507886	2014 PH_{53}	—	January 14, 2013	Mount Lemmon	Mount Lemmon Survey	H	420 m	MPC · JPL
507887	2014 PW_{66}	—	January 22, 2013	Mount Lemmon	Mount Lemmon Survey	H	360 m	MPC · JPL
507888	2014 QD_{169}	—	May 7, 2014	Haleakala	Pan-STARRS 1	H	540 m	MPC · JPL
507889	2014 QA_{328}	—	August 25, 2014	Haleakala	Pan-STARRS 1	H	410 m	MPC · JPL
507890	2014 QB_{409}	—	October 4, 2004	Kitt Peak	Spacewatch	·	500 m	MPC · JPL
507891	2014 QM_{442}	—	August 25, 2014	Haleakala	Pan-STARRS 1	H	480 m	MPC · JPL
507892	2014 RG_{12}	—	September 6, 2014	Catalina	CSS	H	700 m	MPC · JPL
507893	2014 SG_{217}	—	September 20, 2014	Haleakala	Pan-STARRS 1	H	520 m	MPC · JPL
507894	2014 SF_{261}	—	June 12, 2008	Kitt Peak	Spacewatch	H	700 m	MPC · JPL
507895	2014 SH_{262}	—	January 17, 2008	Mount Lemmon	Mount Lemmon Survey	H	420 m	MPC · JPL
507896	2014 SV_{350}	—	September 2, 2014	Kitt Peak	Spacewatch	H	430 m	MPC · JPL
507897	2014 SL_{351}	—	September 20, 2014	Haleakala	Pan-STARRS 1	H	390 m	MPC · JPL
507898	2014 TS_{17}	—	November 25, 2009	Mount Lemmon	Mount Lemmon Survey	H	470 m	MPC · JPL
507899	2014 TU_{34}	—	September 14, 2014	Haleakala	Pan-STARRS 1	H	580 m	MPC · JPL
507900	2014 TO_{86}	—	October 2, 2014	Catalina	CSS	H	510 m	MPC · JPL

== 507901–508000 ==
back to top

Designation			Discovery			Properties		Ref
Permanent	Provisional	Named after	Date	Site	Discoverer(s)	Category	Diam.	Ref
507901	2014 UZ_{11}	—	January 20, 2009	Kitt Peak	Spacewatch	·	500 m	MPC · JPL
507902	2014 UX_{50}	—	January 2, 2009	Kitt Peak	Spacewatch	·	630 m	MPC · JPL
507903	2014 UE_{119}	—	December 3, 2004	Kitt Peak	Spacewatch	·	760 m	MPC · JPL
507904	2014 UB_{148}	—	April 5, 2013	Haleakala	Pan-STARRS 1	·	690 m	MPC · JPL
507905	2014 US_{227}	—	May 15, 2009	Kitt Peak	Spacewatch	·	1.1 km	MPC · JPL
507906	2014 VY_{1}	—	July 5, 2003	Kitt Peak	Spacewatch	H	660 m	MPC · JPL
507907	2014 VX_{22}	—	October 21, 2014	Kitt Peak	Spacewatch	·	760 m	MPC · JPL
507908	2014 VS_{30}	—	December 1, 2008	Mount Lemmon	Mount Lemmon Survey	·	800 m	MPC · JPL
507909	2014 WQ_{3}	—	November 30, 2003	Kitt Peak	Spacewatch	H	370 m	MPC · JPL
507910	2014 WU_{69}	—	November 20, 2014	Catalina	CSS	H	790 m	MPC · JPL
507911	2014 WO_{119}	—	November 12, 2007	Mount Lemmon	Mount Lemmon Survey	·	580 m	MPC · JPL
507912	2014 WQ_{135}	—	August 29, 2006	Kitt Peak	Spacewatch	·	1.1 km	MPC · JPL
507913	2014 WX_{141}	—	October 18, 2014	Mount Lemmon	Mount Lemmon Survey	·	640 m	MPC · JPL
507914	2014 WW_{209}	—	November 17, 2014	Haleakala	Pan-STARRS 1	·	690 m	MPC · JPL
507915	2014 WB_{429}	—	January 30, 2011	Haleakala	Pan-STARRS 1	·	2.0 km	MPC · JPL
507916	2014 WH_{429}	—	February 27, 2006	Catalina	CSS	EUN	1.4 km	MPC · JPL
507917	2014 WM_{480}	—	August 3, 2013	Haleakala	Pan-STARRS 1	·	1.3 km	MPC · JPL
507918	2014 WD_{495}	—	May 29, 2008	Kitt Peak	Spacewatch	·	1.2 km	MPC · JPL
507919	2014 WN_{498}	—	October 1, 2011	Mount Lemmon	Mount Lemmon Survey	H	590 m	MPC · JPL
507920	2014 WL_{505}	—	October 3, 2014	Haleakala	Pan-STARRS 1	H	600 m	MPC · JPL
507921	2014 WH_{516}	—	January 2, 2006	Mount Lemmon	Mount Lemmon Survey	·	1.8 km	MPC · JPL
507922	2014 XA_{8}	—	December 13, 2014	Haleakala	Pan-STARRS 1	H	650 m	MPC · JPL
507923	2014 XX_{37}	—	January 1, 2008	Kitt Peak	Spacewatch	V	760 m	MPC · JPL
507924	2014 XH_{38}	—	May 1, 2008	Siding Spring	SSS	slow	1.5 km	MPC · JPL
507925	2014 YK_{5}	—	December 1, 2010	Mount Lemmon	Mount Lemmon Survey	V	760 m	MPC · JPL
507926	2014 YY_{33}	—	January 19, 2012	Haleakala	Pan-STARRS 1	·	870 m	MPC · JPL
507927	2014 YC_{54}	—	March 4, 2008	Mount Lemmon	Mount Lemmon Survey	·	900 m	MPC · JPL
507928	2014 YD_{54}	—	November 26, 2010	Mount Lemmon	Mount Lemmon Survey	·	880 m	MPC · JPL
507929	2015 AK_{14}	—	January 28, 2011	Catalina	CSS	·	1.6 km	MPC · JPL
507930	2015 AF_{15}	—	January 11, 2015	Haleakala	Pan-STARRS 1	·	1.2 km	MPC · JPL
507931	2015 AM_{39}	—	May 27, 2009	Mount Lemmon	Mount Lemmon Survey	·	1.2 km	MPC · JPL
507932	2015 AS_{41}	—	November 5, 2007	Kitt Peak	Spacewatch	·	510 m	MPC · JPL
507933	2015 AQ_{108}	—	May 24, 2006	Mount Lemmon	Mount Lemmon Survey	·	800 m	MPC · JPL
507934	2015 AM_{123}	—	November 9, 2007	Kitt Peak	Spacewatch	·	570 m	MPC · JPL
507935	2015 AL_{125}	—	February 11, 2008	Mount Lemmon	Mount Lemmon Survey	V	510 m	MPC · JPL
507936	2015 AZ_{156}	—	December 21, 2014	Haleakala	Pan-STARRS 1	·	590 m	MPC · JPL
507937	2015 AJ_{159}	—	March 8, 2005	Kitt Peak	Spacewatch	BAP	680 m	MPC · JPL
507938	2015 AR_{178}	—	September 17, 2010	Mount Lemmon	Mount Lemmon Survey	·	560 m	MPC · JPL
507939	2015 AQ_{192}	—	January 30, 2012	Haleakala	Pan-STARRS 1	·	1.1 km	MPC · JPL
507940	2015 AS_{196}	—	February 13, 2008	Mount Lemmon	Mount Lemmon Survey	NYS	1.1 km	MPC · JPL
507941	2015 AA_{210}	—	September 17, 2004	Kitt Peak	Spacewatch	·	450 m	MPC · JPL
507942	2015 AY_{223}	—	December 3, 2010	Mount Lemmon	Mount Lemmon Survey	·	1 km	MPC · JPL
507943	2015 AM_{224}	—	June 7, 2008	Catalina	CSS	·	1.4 km	MPC · JPL
507944	2015 AF_{233}	—	September 30, 2009	Mount Lemmon	Mount Lemmon Survey	·	1.6 km	MPC · JPL
507945	2015 AM_{239}	—	August 23, 2001	Anderson Mesa	LONEOS	·	1.6 km	MPC · JPL
507946	2015 AE_{245}	—	January 8, 2011	Mount Lemmon	Mount Lemmon Survey	·	1.1 km	MPC · JPL
507947	2015 AV_{253}	—	January 14, 2015	Haleakala	Pan-STARRS 1	·	570 m	MPC · JPL
507948	2015 AF_{263}	—	November 6, 2007	Mount Lemmon	Mount Lemmon Survey	·	640 m	MPC · JPL
507949	2015 AT_{264}	—	January 15, 2015	Haleakala	Pan-STARRS 1	·	1.0 km	MPC · JPL
507950	2015 BE_{3}	—	November 19, 2006	Kitt Peak	Spacewatch	CLA	1.5 km	MPC · JPL
507951	2015 BO_{6}	—	November 29, 2014	Haleakala	Pan-STARRS 1	·	1.6 km	MPC · JPL
507952	2015 BE_{15}	—	May 16, 2009	Kitt Peak	Spacewatch	·	670 m	MPC · JPL
507953	2015 BT_{17}	—	December 31, 1997	Kitt Peak	Spacewatch	·	610 m	MPC · JPL
507954	2015 BQ_{19}	—	January 19, 2012	Haleakala	Pan-STARRS 1	·	630 m	MPC · JPL
507955	2015 BZ_{19}	—	April 15, 2008	Kitt Peak	Spacewatch	·	1.1 km	MPC · JPL
507956	2015 BY_{25}	—	December 13, 2006	Kitt Peak	Spacewatch	·	1.2 km	MPC · JPL
507957	2015 BB_{26}	—	December 11, 2010	Mount Lemmon	Mount Lemmon Survey	·	1.2 km	MPC · JPL
507958	2015 BY_{32}	—	October 30, 2005	Mount Lemmon	Mount Lemmon Survey	·	1.2 km	MPC · JPL
507959	2015 BE_{33}	—	November 15, 1998	Kitt Peak	Spacewatch	·	1.0 km	MPC · JPL
507960	2015 BZ_{37}	—	November 21, 2014	Haleakala	Pan-STARRS 1	(2076)	580 m	MPC · JPL
507961	2015 BV_{59}	—	January 1, 2008	Kitt Peak	Spacewatch	·	540 m	MPC · JPL
507962	2015 BJ_{62}	—	January 16, 2008	Mount Lemmon	Mount Lemmon Survey	·	640 m	MPC · JPL
507963	2015 BA_{64}	—	March 27, 2008	Kitt Peak	Spacewatch	V	480 m	MPC · JPL
507964	2015 BU_{64}	—	January 17, 2015	Haleakala	Pan-STARRS 1	·	1.3 km	MPC · JPL
507965	2015 BJ_{65}	—	January 24, 2011	Mount Lemmon	Mount Lemmon Survey	·	1.0 km	MPC · JPL
507966	2015 BO_{65}	—	November 30, 2005	Kitt Peak	Spacewatch	·	1.6 km	MPC · JPL
507967	2015 BR_{69}	—	March 12, 2008	Kitt Peak	Spacewatch	·	1.1 km	MPC · JPL
507968	2015 BM_{71}	—	March 11, 2008	Mount Lemmon	Mount Lemmon Survey	·	1 km	MPC · JPL
507969	2015 BX_{71}	—	December 6, 2010	Mount Lemmon	Mount Lemmon Survey	·	1.2 km	MPC · JPL
507970	2015 BA_{75}	—	December 18, 2007	Mount Lemmon	Mount Lemmon Survey	·	740 m	MPC · JPL
507971	2015 BS_{76}	—	March 31, 2012	Kitt Peak	Spacewatch	V	470 m	MPC · JPL
507972	2015 BZ_{76}	—	February 28, 2008	Mount Lemmon	Mount Lemmon Survey	·	1.5 km	MPC · JPL
507973	2015 BD_{79}	—	April 1, 2012	Mount Lemmon	Mount Lemmon Survey	·	660 m	MPC · JPL
507974	2015 BU_{90}	—	April 5, 2008	Mount Lemmon	Mount Lemmon Survey	·	1.2 km	MPC · JPL
507975	2015 BY_{90}	—	January 13, 2005	Kitt Peak	Spacewatch	·	690 m	MPC · JPL
507976	2015 BU_{95}	—	July 13, 2013	Haleakala	Pan-STARRS 1	·	520 m	MPC · JPL
507977	2015 BH_{98}	—	January 16, 2015	Mount Lemmon	Mount Lemmon Survey	·	2.6 km	MPC · JPL
507978	2015 BP_{100}	—	January 11, 2008	Mount Lemmon	Mount Lemmon Survey	·	1.2 km	MPC · JPL
507979	2015 BA_{104}	—	September 22, 2008	Kitt Peak	Spacewatch	AGN	1.1 km	MPC · JPL
507980	2015 BC_{107}	—	January 16, 2015	Haleakala	Pan-STARRS 1	·	1.5 km	MPC · JPL
507981	2015 BM_{114}	—	February 26, 2009	Mount Lemmon	Mount Lemmon Survey	·	620 m	MPC · JPL
507982	2015 BS_{119}	—	February 3, 2008	Kitt Peak	Spacewatch	·	630 m	MPC · JPL
507983	2015 BN_{120}	—	February 3, 2008	Mount Lemmon	Mount Lemmon Survey	·	570 m	MPC · JPL
507984	2015 BG_{130}	—	March 9, 2007	Kitt Peak	Spacewatch	·	1.1 km	MPC · JPL
507985	2015 BM_{140}	—	November 2, 2010	Kitt Peak	Spacewatch	·	870 m	MPC · JPL
507986	2015 BC_{149}	—	November 17, 2007	Kitt Peak	Spacewatch	·	770 m	MPC · JPL
507987	2015 BA_{157}	—	March 31, 2008	Mount Lemmon	Mount Lemmon Survey	·	1.1 km	MPC · JPL
507988	2015 BF_{161}	—	September 6, 2008	Mount Lemmon	Mount Lemmon Survey	·	1.4 km	MPC · JPL
507989	2015 BK_{169}	—	April 15, 2012	Haleakala	Pan-STARRS 1	·	680 m	MPC · JPL
507990	2015 BJ_{170}	—	February 9, 2008	Kitt Peak	Spacewatch	·	810 m	MPC · JPL
507991	2015 BS_{171}	—	July 14, 2013	Haleakala	Pan-STARRS 1	·	870 m	MPC · JPL
507992	2015 BG_{189}	—	February 16, 2004	Kitt Peak	Spacewatch	V	720 m	MPC · JPL
507993	2015 BA_{192}	—	August 21, 2006	Kitt Peak	Spacewatch	·	990 m	MPC · JPL
507994	2015 BS_{195}	—	January 26, 2011	Mount Lemmon	Mount Lemmon Survey	·	1.3 km	MPC · JPL
507995	2015 BQ_{202}	—	December 20, 2007	Kitt Peak	Spacewatch	·	670 m	MPC · JPL
507996	2015 BM_{211}	—	March 11, 2005	Mount Lemmon	Mount Lemmon Survey	·	620 m	MPC · JPL
507997	2015 BF_{241}	—	October 3, 2010	Kitt Peak	Spacewatch	·	530 m	MPC · JPL
507998	2015 BC_{247}	—	December 30, 2007	Mount Lemmon	Mount Lemmon Survey	·	570 m	MPC · JPL
507999	2015 BX_{251}	—	March 9, 2005	Kitt Peak	Spacewatch	·	630 m	MPC · JPL
508000	2015 BL_{252}	—	March 5, 2008	Mount Lemmon	Mount Lemmon Survey	·	1.0 km	MPC · JPL

back to top

== Meaning of names ==
As minor planet discoveries are confirmed, they are given a permanent number by the IAU's Minor Planet Center (MPC), and the discoverers can then submit names for them, following the IAU's naming conventions. The list below concerns those minor planets in the specified number-range that have received names, and explains the meanings of those names.

Official naming citations of newly named small Solar System bodies are approved and published in a bulletin by IAU's Working Group for Small Bodies Nomenclature (WGSBN). Before May 2021, citations were published in MPC's Minor Planet Circulars for many decades. Recent citations can also be found on the JPL Small-Body Database (SBDB). Until his death in 2016, German astronomer Lutz D. Schmadel compiled these citations into the Dictionary of Minor Planet Names (DMP) and regularly updated the collection.

Based on Paul Herget's The Names of the Minor Planets, Schmadel also researched the unclear origin of numerous asteroids, most of which had been named prior to World War II. This article incorporates text from this source, which is in the public domain: SBDB New namings may only be added to this list below after official publication as the preannouncement of names is condemned. The WGSBN publishes a comprehensive guideline for the naming rules of non-cometary small Solar System bodies.

Named minor planet	Provisional	This minor planet was named for...	Ref · Catalog
507490 Possum	2012 UZ_{28}	The Possum Observatory (E94) near Gisborne, New Zealand. It regularly conducts and submits astrometric observations of comets, asteroids and NEOs. In addition, Possum Observatory has helped detect exoplanets using microlensing. The observatory is named after the owner, John Drummond's late wife, Elizabeth `Possum' Drummond.	JPL · 507490
