= List of minor planets: 510001–511000 =

The following is a partial list of minor planets, running from minor-planet number 510001 through 511000, inclusive. The primary data for this and other partial lists is based on JPL's "Small-Body Orbital Elements" and data available from the Minor Planet Center. Critical list information is also provided by the MPC, unless otherwise specified from Lowell Observatory. A detailed description of the table's columns and additional sources are given on the main page including a complete list of every page in this series, and a statistical break-up on the dynamical classification of minor planets.

Also see the summary list of all named bodies in numerical and alphabetical order, and the corresponding naming citations for the number range of this particular list. New namings may only be added to this list after official publication, as the preannouncement of names is condemned by the Working Group for Small Bodies Nomenclature of the International Astronomical Union.

Near-Earth obj.	MBA (inner)	MBA (outer)	Centaur
Mars-crosser	MBA (middle)	Jupiter trojan	Trans-Neptunian obj.
Unclassified

== 510001–510100 ==
Designation			Discovery			Properties		Ref
Permanent	Provisional	Named after	Date	Site	Discoverer(s)	Category	Diam.	Ref
510001	2009 VR_{59}	—	October 14, 2009	Mount Lemmon	Mount Lemmon Survey	·	1.9 km	MPC · JPL
510002	2009 VP_{92}	—	November 8, 2009	Catalina	CSS	·	1.5 km	MPC · JPL
510003	2009 VH_{112}	—	November 9, 2009	Catalina	CSS	H	510 m	MPC · JPL
510004	2009 WT_{17}	—	October 26, 2009	Kitt Peak	Spacewatch	·	1.0 km	MPC · JPL
510005	2009 WJ_{24}	—	October 14, 2009	Mount Lemmon	Mount Lemmon Survey	·	1.3 km	MPC · JPL
510006	2009 WF_{25}	—	November 21, 2009	Catalina	CSS	H	620 m	MPC · JPL
510007	2009 WU_{27}	—	October 27, 2009	Kitt Peak	Spacewatch	NYS	970 m	MPC · JPL
510008	2009 WQ_{29}	—	September 29, 2009	Mount Lemmon	Mount Lemmon Survey	V	530 m	MPC · JPL
510009	2009 WU_{36}	—	November 17, 2009	Kitt Peak	Spacewatch	·	840 m	MPC · JPL
510010	2009 WK_{70}	—	November 18, 2009	Kitt Peak	Spacewatch	MAS	610 m	MPC · JPL
510011	2009 WQ_{145}	—	November 8, 2009	Catalina	CSS	H	470 m	MPC · JPL
510012	2009 WN_{260}	—	November 25, 2009	Kitt Peak	Spacewatch	MAR	910 m	MPC · JPL
510013	2009 YZ_{1}	—	December 17, 2009	Mount Lemmon	Mount Lemmon Survey	·	1.3 km	MPC · JPL
510014	2009 YN_{7}	—	December 16, 2009	Kitt Peak	Spacewatch	3:2	4.2 km	MPC · JPL
510015	2009 YL_{11}	—	December 18, 2009	Mount Lemmon	Mount Lemmon Survey	·	2.3 km	MPC · JPL
510016	2009 YJ_{14}	—	December 18, 2009	Mount Lemmon	Mount Lemmon Survey	H	470 m	MPC · JPL
510017	2009 YB_{21}	—	December 27, 2009	Kitt Peak	Spacewatch	·	790 m	MPC · JPL
510018	2010 AA_{4}	—	January 9, 2010	Mount Lemmon	Mount Lemmon Survey	H	570 m	MPC · JPL
510019	2010 AF_{21}	—	January 5, 2010	Kitt Peak	Spacewatch	H	440 m	MPC · JPL
510020	2010 AW_{31}	—	December 19, 2009	Mount Lemmon	Mount Lemmon Survey	EUN	1.1 km	MPC · JPL
510021	2010 AV_{50}	—	January 8, 2010	Kitt Peak	Spacewatch	·	1.2 km	MPC · JPL
510022	2010 AN_{77}	—	January 12, 2010	Catalina	CSS	·	1.7 km	MPC · JPL
510023	2010 AT_{125}	—	January 14, 2010	WISE	WISE	·	2.7 km	MPC · JPL
510024	2010 BW_{60}	—	January 21, 2010	WISE	WISE	·	2.4 km	MPC · JPL
510025	2010 BX_{99}	—	January 27, 2010	WISE	WISE	T_{j} (2.98)	4.5 km	MPC · JPL
510026	2010 BH_{130}	—	May 4, 2010	Kitt Peak	Spacewatch	·	2.1 km	MPC · JPL
510027	2010 CK_{4}	—	February 6, 2010	Mount Lemmon	Mount Lemmon Survey	H	560 m	MPC · JPL
510028	2010 CL_{17}	—	February 11, 2010	WISE	WISE	·	2.3 km	MPC · JPL
510029	2010 CF_{31}	—	February 9, 2010	Kitt Peak	Spacewatch	·	1.6 km	MPC · JPL
510030	2010 CF_{33}	—	January 12, 2010	Kitt Peak	Spacewatch	·	1.1 km	MPC · JPL
510031	2010 CN_{41}	—	February 5, 2010	Catalina	CSS	H	760 m	MPC · JPL
510032	2010 CX_{98}	—	February 14, 2010	Kitt Peak	Spacewatch	·	1.2 km	MPC · JPL
510033	2010 CB_{104}	—	February 14, 2010	Kitt Peak	Spacewatch	H	540 m	MPC · JPL
510034	2010 CX_{152}	—	February 14, 2010	Kitt Peak	Spacewatch	(5)	920 m	MPC · JPL
510035	2010 CS_{161}	—	February 6, 2010	Kitt Peak	Spacewatch	BRG	1.3 km	MPC · JPL
510036	2010 CW_{181}	—	February 15, 2010	Mount Lemmon	Mount Lemmon Survey	·	1.9 km	MPC · JPL
510037	2010 CS_{182}	—	February 17, 2010	Mount Lemmon	Mount Lemmon Survey	·	970 m	MPC · JPL
510038	2010 CM_{183}	—	February 13, 2010	Mount Lemmon	Mount Lemmon Survey	·	990 m	MPC · JPL
510039	2010 CH_{185}	—	February 15, 2010	Catalina	CSS	H	550 m	MPC · JPL
510040	2010 CP_{206}	—	February 4, 2010	WISE	WISE	·	4.6 km	MPC · JPL
510041	2010 CY_{213}	—	January 13, 2005	Socorro	LINEAR	·	2.5 km	MPC · JPL
510042	2010 DB_{64}	—	February 26, 2010	WISE	WISE	·	1.4 km	MPC · JPL
510043	2010 DC_{76}	—	February 18, 2010	Mount Lemmon	Mount Lemmon Survey	JUN	970 m	MPC · JPL
510044	2010 DB_{79}	—	February 19, 2010	Mount Lemmon	Mount Lemmon Survey	·	1.7 km	MPC · JPL
510045 Vincematteo	2010 EP_{2}	Vincematteo	March 4, 2010	Vail-Jarnac	D. H. Levy, Glinos, T.	·	1.6 km	MPC · JPL
510046	2010 ED_{31}	—	March 4, 2010	Kitt Peak	Spacewatch	H	430 m	MPC · JPL
510047	2010 EM_{35}	—	March 10, 2010	La Sagra	OAM	EUN	1.5 km	MPC · JPL
510048	2010 EK_{72}	—	February 19, 2010	Mount Lemmon	Mount Lemmon Survey	HNS	860 m	MPC · JPL
510049	2010 EM_{77}	—	March 12, 2010	Catalina	CSS	·	2.4 km	MPC · JPL
510050	2010 EH_{107}	—	March 12, 2010	Kitt Peak	Spacewatch	·	1.2 km	MPC · JPL
510051	2010 EJ_{107}	—	February 18, 2010	Mount Lemmon	Mount Lemmon Survey	·	1.1 km	MPC · JPL
510052	2010 EB_{138}	—	March 13, 2010	Mount Lemmon	Mount Lemmon Survey	·	1.6 km	MPC · JPL
510053	2010 FQ_{31}	—	March 20, 2010	Siding Spring	SSS	·	1.3 km	MPC · JPL
510054	2010 FK_{69}	—	September 28, 2006	Catalina	CSS	·	5.0 km	MPC · JPL
510055	2010 FH_{81}	—	April 1, 2010	WISE	WISE	APO · PHA	200 m	MPC · JPL
510056	2010 FN_{92}	—	February 14, 2010	Mount Lemmon	Mount Lemmon Survey	·	1.7 km	MPC · JPL
510057	2010 FM_{97}	—	March 17, 2010	Kitt Peak	Spacewatch	·	1.4 km	MPC · JPL
510058	2010 GW_{65}	—	April 4, 2010	XuYi	PMO NEO Survey Program	H	570 m	MPC · JPL
510059	2010 GS_{143}	—	April 6, 2010	Kitt Peak	Spacewatch	JUN	820 m	MPC · JPL
510060	2010 GL_{145}	—	April 6, 2010	Kitt Peak	Spacewatch	·	1.3 km	MPC · JPL
510061	2010 GB_{146}	—	April 6, 2010	Catalina	CSS	·	3.4 km	MPC · JPL
510062	2010 GE_{159}	—	April 6, 2010	Catalina	CSS	·	1.6 km	MPC · JPL
510063	2010 HU_{21}	—	April 22, 2010	WISE	WISE	L5	7.1 km	MPC · JPL
510064	2010 HO_{45}	—	April 23, 2010	WISE	WISE	EOS	1.7 km	MPC · JPL
510065	2010 HG_{59}	—	April 24, 2010	WISE	WISE	·	1.5 km	MPC · JPL
510066	2010 HG_{74}	—	April 28, 2010	WISE	WISE	·	3.2 km	MPC · JPL
510067	2010 HZ_{107}	—	April 25, 2010	Mount Lemmon	Mount Lemmon Survey	·	1.6 km	MPC · JPL
510068	2010 HX_{108}	—	April 20, 2010	Mount Lemmon	Mount Lemmon Survey	JUN	1.0 km	MPC · JPL
510069	2010 JZ_{29}	—	April 9, 2010	Kitt Peak	Spacewatch	ADE	1.8 km	MPC · JPL
510070	2010 JO_{72}	—	May 6, 2010	Kitt Peak	Spacewatch	·	2.2 km	MPC · JPL
510071	2010 JJ_{76}	—	April 14, 2010	Mount Lemmon	Mount Lemmon Survey	·	2.0 km	MPC · JPL
510072	2010 JL_{83}	—	May 6, 2010	Catalina	CSS	·	2.6 km	MPC · JPL
510073	2010 JF_{88}	—	May 14, 2010	Catalina	CSS	APO	450 m	MPC · JPL
510074	2010 JQ_{111}	—	May 11, 2010	Mount Lemmon	Mount Lemmon Survey	·	1.4 km	MPC · JPL
510075	2010 JN_{132}	—	November 25, 2006	Kitt Peak	Spacewatch	·	6.5 km	MPC · JPL
510076	2010 JB_{153}	—	May 13, 2010	Catalina	CSS	·	1.4 km	MPC · JPL
510077	2010 JF_{176}	—	December 31, 2008	Kitt Peak	Spacewatch	·	1.7 km	MPC · JPL
510078	2010 JN_{179}	—	November 19, 2003	Kitt Peak	Spacewatch	L5	10 km	MPC · JPL
510079	2010 KZ_{36}	—	April 6, 2010	Kitt Peak	Spacewatch	·	1.8 km	MPC · JPL
510080	2010 KB_{60}	—	April 11, 2010	Kitt Peak	Spacewatch	·	1.4 km	MPC · JPL
510081	2010 KP_{97}	—	May 28, 2010	WISE	WISE	·	3.6 km	MPC · JPL
510082	2010 KL_{100}	—	May 28, 2010	WISE	WISE	·	3.8 km	MPC · JPL
510083	2010 KC_{114}	—	May 30, 2010	WISE	WISE	·	3.3 km	MPC · JPL
510084	2010 KB_{117}	—	May 30, 2010	WISE	WISE	·	3.9 km	MPC · JPL
510085	2010 LM_{1}	—	May 19, 2010	Mount Lemmon	Mount Lemmon Survey	·	1.7 km	MPC · JPL
510086	2010 LF_{96}	—	February 19, 2010	Kitt Peak	Spacewatch	·	3.4 km	MPC · JPL
510087	2010 MS_{8}	—	November 26, 2006	Kitt Peak	Spacewatch	·	3.8 km	MPC · JPL
510088	2010 MY_{24}	—	February 21, 2007	Mount Lemmon	Mount Lemmon Survey	·	4.3 km	MPC · JPL
510089	2010 MD_{36}	—	June 21, 2010	WISE	WISE	EUP	3.4 km	MPC · JPL
510090	2010 MY_{93}	—	June 28, 2010	WISE	WISE	·	2.9 km	MPC · JPL
510091	2010 NH_{35}	—	October 25, 2005	Kitt Peak	Spacewatch	·	3.2 km	MPC · JPL
510092	2010 OX_{6}	—	January 19, 2010	WISE	WISE	·	2.3 km	MPC · JPL
510093	2010 OK_{10}	—	July 16, 2010	WISE	WISE	EMA	4.3 km	MPC · JPL
510094	2010 OS_{40}	—	July 21, 2010	WISE	WISE	·	3.0 km	MPC · JPL
510095	2010 ON_{55}	—	July 23, 2010	WISE	WISE	EUP	3.8 km	MPC · JPL
510096	2010 OD_{64}	—	July 24, 2010	WISE	WISE	·	3.0 km	MPC · JPL
510097	2010 OF_{126}	—	July 23, 2010	WISE	WISE	T_{j} (2.87)	5.7 km	MPC · JPL
510098	2010 PZ_{40}	—	July 27, 2009	Kitt Peak	Spacewatch	·	3.3 km	MPC · JPL
510099	2010 PZ_{61}	—	August 10, 2010	Kitt Peak	Spacewatch	·	520 m	MPC · JPL
510100	2010 PY_{70}	—	August 10, 2010	WISE	WISE	T_{j} (2.97)	6.0 km	MPC · JPL

== 510101–510200 ==
back to top

Designation			Discovery			Properties		Ref
Permanent	Provisional	Named after	Date	Site	Discoverer(s)	Category	Diam.	Ref
510101	2010 RE_{8}	—	June 13, 2010	WISE	WISE	·	3.1 km	MPC · JPL
510102	2010 RK_{11}	—	September 2, 2010	Mount Lemmon	Mount Lemmon Survey	EOS	1.6 km	MPC · JPL
510103	2010 RO_{22}	—	October 1, 2000	Socorro	LINEAR	·	580 m	MPC · JPL
510104	2010 RE_{50}	—	September 4, 2010	Kitt Peak	Spacewatch	·	3.2 km	MPC · JPL
510105	2010 RA_{60}	—	September 6, 2010	Kitt Peak	Spacewatch	·	590 m	MPC · JPL
510106	2010 RF_{62}	—	September 7, 2010	La Sagra	OAM	·	630 m	MPC · JPL
510107	2010 RW_{80}	—	December 15, 2007	Kitt Peak	Spacewatch	·	640 m	MPC · JPL
510108	2010 RR_{100}	—	September 10, 2010	Kitt Peak	Spacewatch	·	3.3 km	MPC · JPL
510109	2010 RR_{101}	—	September 10, 2010	Kitt Peak	Spacewatch	·	530 m	MPC · JPL
510110	2010 RF_{103}	—	September 10, 2010	Kitt Peak	Spacewatch	·	630 m	MPC · JPL
510111	2010 RG_{112}	—	November 25, 2005	Mount Lemmon	Mount Lemmon Survey	THM	2.0 km	MPC · JPL
510112	2010 RN_{149}	—	September 15, 2010	Kitt Peak	Spacewatch	EOS	1.9 km	MPC · JPL
510113	2010 RV_{156}	—	September 15, 2010	Mount Lemmon	Mount Lemmon Survey	·	3.3 km	MPC · JPL
510114	2010 SC_{23}	—	September 17, 2010	Mount Lemmon	Mount Lemmon Survey	·	1.9 km	MPC · JPL
510115	2010 SG_{40}	—	September 30, 2010	Mount Lemmon	Mount Lemmon Survey	·	2.5 km	MPC · JPL
510116	2010 TP_{6}	—	September 11, 2010	Catalina	CSS	·	670 m	MPC · JPL
510117	2010 TU_{17}	—	December 15, 2006	Kitt Peak	Spacewatch	·	2.2 km	MPC · JPL
510118	2010 TD_{21}	—	October 1, 2010	Kitt Peak	Spacewatch	·	2.3 km	MPC · JPL
510119	2010 TZ_{25}	—	October 2, 2010	Kitt Peak	Spacewatch	·	2.0 km	MPC · JPL
510120	2010 TT_{61}	—	January 27, 2007	Mount Lemmon	Mount Lemmon Survey	·	3.6 km	MPC · JPL
510121	2010 TN_{75}	—	September 17, 2010	Kitt Peak	Spacewatch	·	670 m	MPC · JPL
510122	2010 TK_{84}	—	November 19, 2007	Kitt Peak	Spacewatch	·	520 m	MPC · JPL
510123	2010 TA_{91}	—	September 4, 2010	Kitt Peak	Spacewatch	·	490 m	MPC · JPL
510124	2010 TA_{101}	—	September 16, 2010	Kitt Peak	Spacewatch	·	3.1 km	MPC · JPL
510125	2010 TG_{124}	—	October 1, 2010	Kitt Peak	Spacewatch	·	470 m	MPC · JPL
510126	2010 TY_{137}	—	October 11, 2010	Mount Lemmon	Mount Lemmon Survey	·	690 m	MPC · JPL
510127	2010 TL_{176}	—	October 1, 2010	La Sagra	OAM	·	3.4 km	MPC · JPL
510128	2010 TQ_{176}	—	October 1, 2010	La Sagra	OAM	·	680 m	MPC · JPL
510129	2010 UX_{1}	—	October 17, 2010	Mount Lemmon	Mount Lemmon Survey	·	2.9 km	MPC · JPL
510130	2010 US_{9}	—	September 18, 2010	Mount Lemmon	Mount Lemmon Survey	·	620 m	MPC · JPL
510131	2010 UC_{45}	—	October 13, 2010	Mount Lemmon	Mount Lemmon Survey	·	580 m	MPC · JPL
510132	2010 UY_{57}	—	October 8, 1996	Kitt Peak	Spacewatch	·	620 m	MPC · JPL
510133	2010 UH_{59}	—	October 21, 2003	Kitt Peak	Spacewatch	·	620 m	MPC · JPL
510134	2010 UJ_{69}	—	September 10, 2010	Mount Lemmon	Mount Lemmon Survey	·	630 m	MPC · JPL
510135	2010 UY_{69}	—	October 28, 2010	Catalina	CSS	·	4.3 km	MPC · JPL
510136	2010 UH_{70}	—	August 12, 2010	Kitt Peak	Spacewatch	·	850 m	MPC · JPL
510137	2010 UK_{70}	—	December 31, 2007	Kitt Peak	Spacewatch	·	570 m	MPC · JPL
510138	2010 UJ_{80}	—	October 30, 2010	Mount Lemmon	Mount Lemmon Survey	·	620 m	MPC · JPL
510139	2010 UX_{82}	—	October 2, 2010	Kitt Peak	Spacewatch	URS	2.7 km	MPC · JPL
510140	2010 UK_{108}	—	October 30, 2010	Kitt Peak	Spacewatch	L4	7.9 km	MPC · JPL
510141	2010 VQ_{36}	—	January 15, 2008	Mount Lemmon	Mount Lemmon Survey	·	630 m	MPC · JPL
510142	2010 VC_{46}	—	October 13, 2010	Mount Lemmon	Mount Lemmon Survey	(6355)	4.1 km	MPC · JPL
510143	2010 VQ_{67}	—	October 13, 2010	Mount Lemmon	Mount Lemmon Survey	·	2.4 km	MPC · JPL
510144	2010 VE_{78}	—	September 11, 2010	Mount Lemmon	Mount Lemmon Survey	·	580 m	MPC · JPL
510145	2010 VW_{91}	—	November 19, 2003	Kitt Peak	Spacewatch	·	550 m	MPC · JPL
510146	2010 VO_{108}	—	January 13, 2008	Mount Lemmon	Mount Lemmon Survey	·	460 m	MPC · JPL
510147	2010 VH_{152}	—	November 6, 2010	Mount Lemmon	Mount Lemmon Survey	·	630 m	MPC · JPL
510148	2010 VF_{160}	—	February 2, 2005	Kitt Peak	Spacewatch	·	460 m	MPC · JPL
510149	2010 VC_{168}	—	January 14, 2008	Kitt Peak	Spacewatch	·	540 m	MPC · JPL
510150	2010 VC_{173}	—	October 14, 2010	Mount Lemmon	Mount Lemmon Survey	·	570 m	MPC · JPL
510151	2010 VR_{214}	—	February 9, 2007	Kitt Peak	Spacewatch	·	3.3 km	MPC · JPL
510152	2010 WU_{2}	—	October 30, 2010	Kitt Peak	Spacewatch	·	640 m	MPC · JPL
510153	2010 WQ_{30}	—	October 20, 2003	Kitt Peak	Spacewatch	·	670 m	MPC · JPL
510154	2010 WJ_{35}	—	November 8, 2010	Kitt Peak	Spacewatch	·	630 m	MPC · JPL
510155	2010 WZ_{47}	—	November 10, 2010	Mount Lemmon	Mount Lemmon Survey	·	940 m	MPC · JPL
510156	2010 WO_{55}	—	November 24, 2003	Kitt Peak	Spacewatch	·	1.3 km	MPC · JPL
510157	2010 XB_{23}	—	November 16, 2003	Kitt Peak	Spacewatch	·	500 m	MPC · JPL
510158	2010 XN_{31}	—	January 11, 2008	Kitt Peak	Spacewatch	·	490 m	MPC · JPL
510159	2010 XF_{56}	—	December 1, 2010	Mount Lemmon	Mount Lemmon Survey	CYB	3.8 km	MPC · JPL
510160	2010 XO_{56}	—	December 11, 2010	Socorro	LINEAR	APO	320 m	MPC · JPL
510161	2010 XR_{56}	—	February 28, 2008	Mount Lemmon	Mount Lemmon Survey	·	700 m	MPC · JPL
510162	2010 XT_{76}	—	November 14, 2010	Mount Lemmon	Mount Lemmon Survey	·	490 m	MPC · JPL
510163	2010 XJ_{77}	—	August 15, 2009	Catalina	CSS	·	4.0 km	MPC · JPL
510164	2011 AK_{8}	—	January 2, 2011	Mount Lemmon	Mount Lemmon Survey	·	740 m	MPC · JPL
510165	2011 AO_{15}	—	November 15, 2010	Mount Lemmon	Mount Lemmon Survey	·	730 m	MPC · JPL
510166	2011 AZ_{28}	—	January 22, 2004	Socorro	LINEAR	·	850 m	MPC · JPL
510167	2011 AX_{42}	—	September 27, 2006	Kitt Peak	Spacewatch	·	580 m	MPC · JPL
510168	2011 AY_{42}	—	October 23, 2006	Kitt Peak	Spacewatch	·	620 m	MPC · JPL
510169	2011 AH_{43}	—	January 10, 2011	Kitt Peak	Spacewatch	·	920 m	MPC · JPL
510170	2011 AX_{46}	—	February 18, 2004	Kitt Peak	Spacewatch	·	740 m	MPC · JPL
510171	2011 AU_{48}	—	November 16, 2006	Catalina	CSS	·	940 m	MPC · JPL
510172	2011 AY_{50}	—	December 5, 2010	Mount Lemmon	Mount Lemmon Survey	·	610 m	MPC · JPL
510173	2011 AM_{56}	—	December 8, 2010	Mount Lemmon	Mount Lemmon Survey	·	770 m	MPC · JPL
510174	2011 AN_{56}	—	January 10, 2011	Kitt Peak	Spacewatch	·	630 m	MPC · JPL
510175	2011 AO_{69}	—	January 10, 2011	Mount Lemmon	Mount Lemmon Survey	·	580 m	MPC · JPL
510176	2011 BN_{31}	—	February 13, 1997	Kitt Peak	Spacewatch	·	500 m	MPC · JPL
510177	2011 BX_{31}	—	January 8, 2011	Mount Lemmon	Mount Lemmon Survey	·	690 m	MPC · JPL
510178	2011 BC_{43}	—	January 28, 2011	Catalina	CSS	·	980 m	MPC · JPL
510179	2011 BT_{62}	—	October 27, 2006	Catalina	CSS	·	950 m	MPC · JPL
510180	2011 BS_{70}	—	December 1, 2006	Mount Lemmon	Mount Lemmon Survey	·	780 m	MPC · JPL
510181	2011 BN_{101}	—	February 5, 2011	Mayhill	L. Elenin	·	790 m	MPC · JPL
510182	2011 BB_{102}	—	December 22, 2006	Mount Lemmon	Mount Lemmon Survey	NYS	980 m	MPC · JPL
510183	2011 BG_{103}	—	March 23, 2004	Kitt Peak	Spacewatch	3:2	4.3 km	MPC · JPL
510184	2011 BM_{115}	—	September 27, 2006	Mount Lemmon	Mount Lemmon Survey	·	530 m	MPC · JPL
510185	2011 BZ_{118}	—	January 11, 2011	Kitt Peak	Spacewatch	·	590 m	MPC · JPL
510186	2011 BB_{119}	—	January 26, 2011	Mount Lemmon	Mount Lemmon Survey	·	910 m	MPC · JPL
510187	2011 BS_{121}	—	March 16, 2004	Kitt Peak	Spacewatch	·	710 m	MPC · JPL
510188	2011 BW_{123}	—	March 15, 2004	Kitt Peak	Spacewatch	·	690 m	MPC · JPL
510189	2011 CZ_{4}	—	February 5, 2011	Catalina	CSS	·	810 m	MPC · JPL
510190	2011 CX_{7}	—	February 5, 2011	Mount Lemmon	Mount Lemmon Survey	APO	290 m	MPC · JPL
510191	2011 CO_{9}	—	December 10, 2010	Mount Lemmon	Mount Lemmon Survey	MAS	560 m	MPC · JPL
510192	2011 CN_{16}	—	December 10, 2010	Mount Lemmon	Mount Lemmon Survey	·	1.0 km	MPC · JPL
510193	2011 CA_{28}	—	December 10, 2010	Mount Lemmon	Mount Lemmon Survey	·	820 m	MPC · JPL
510194	2011 CZ_{30}	—	February 5, 2011	Catalina	CSS	NYS	780 m	MPC · JPL
510195	2011 CH_{36}	—	December 8, 2010	Mount Lemmon	Mount Lemmon Survey	MAS	560 m	MPC · JPL
510196	2011 CS_{44}	—	January 30, 2011	Mount Lemmon	Mount Lemmon Survey	·	600 m	MPC · JPL
510197	2011 CT_{52}	—	September 30, 2006	Mount Lemmon	Mount Lemmon Survey	·	810 m	MPC · JPL
510198	2011 CY_{66}	—	January 12, 2011	Mount Lemmon	Mount Lemmon Survey	·	900 m	MPC · JPL
510199	2011 CN_{67}	—	December 8, 2010	Mount Lemmon	Mount Lemmon Survey	·	780 m	MPC · JPL
510200	2011 CC_{74}	—	February 10, 2011	Catalina	CSS	PHO	1.2 km	MPC · JPL

== 510201–510300 ==
back to top

Designation			Discovery			Properties		Ref
Permanent	Provisional	Named after	Date	Site	Discoverer(s)	Category	Diam.	Ref
510201	2011 CW_{75}	—	February 10, 2011	Catalina	CSS	·	2.4 km	MPC · JPL
510202	2011 CC_{79}	—	February 4, 2011	Catalina	CSS	·	960 m	MPC · JPL
510203	2011 CR_{79}	—	March 14, 2011	Mount Lemmon	Mount Lemmon Survey	V	500 m	MPC · JPL
510204	2011 CB_{81}	—	January 27, 2011	Kitt Peak	Spacewatch	PHO	800 m	MPC · JPL
510205	2011 CM_{82}	—	February 5, 2011	Haleakala	Pan-STARRS 1	·	780 m	MPC · JPL
510206	2011 CU_{86}	—	January 27, 2011	Kitt Peak	Spacewatch	·	650 m	MPC · JPL
510207	2011 CP_{89}	—	February 12, 2011	Mount Lemmon	Mount Lemmon Survey	·	1.1 km	MPC · JPL
510208	2011 CZ_{111}	—	November 16, 1995	Kitt Peak	Spacewatch	V	410 m	MPC · JPL
510209	2011 CP_{112}	—	February 10, 2011	Mount Lemmon	Mount Lemmon Survey	·	850 m	MPC · JPL
510210	2011 DY_{1}	—	February 23, 2011	Kitt Peak	Spacewatch	V	650 m	MPC · JPL
510211	2011 DP_{11}	—	January 28, 2011	Mount Lemmon	Mount Lemmon Survey	·	760 m	MPC · JPL
510212	2011 DG_{13}	—	November 16, 2006	Kitt Peak	Spacewatch	·	870 m	MPC · JPL
510213	2011 DM_{19}	—	February 25, 2011	Mount Lemmon	Mount Lemmon Survey	·	800 m	MPC · JPL
510214	2011 DQ_{28}	—	January 29, 2011	Kitt Peak	Spacewatch	NYS	1.0 km	MPC · JPL
510215	2011 DJ_{49}	—	February 12, 2011	Mount Lemmon	Mount Lemmon Survey	·	850 m	MPC · JPL
510216	2011 DK_{51}	—	November 14, 2006	Kitt Peak	Spacewatch	·	940 m	MPC · JPL
510217	2011 EK_{5}	—	February 10, 2011	Mount Lemmon	Mount Lemmon Survey	·	1.1 km	MPC · JPL
510218	2011 EW_{7}	—	February 8, 2011	Mount Lemmon	Mount Lemmon Survey	·	740 m	MPC · JPL
510219	2011 ES_{8}	—	October 17, 2006	Mount Lemmon	Mount Lemmon Survey	NYS	660 m	MPC · JPL
510220	2011 EY_{8}	—	November 12, 2006	Mount Lemmon	Mount Lemmon Survey	·	720 m	MPC · JPL
510221	2011 EM_{12}	—	February 23, 2007	Mount Lemmon	Mount Lemmon Survey	MAS	580 m	MPC · JPL
510222	2011 EZ_{18}	—	November 16, 2006	Kitt Peak	Spacewatch	·	710 m	MPC · JPL
510223	2011 ED_{27}	—	March 6, 2011	Kitt Peak	Spacewatch	PHO	940 m	MPC · JPL
510224	2011 EU_{27}	—	November 18, 2006	Mount Lemmon	Mount Lemmon Survey	·	560 m	MPC · JPL
510225	2011 EE_{29}	—	December 14, 2006	Mount Lemmon	Mount Lemmon Survey	·	730 m	MPC · JPL
510226	2011 EH_{35}	—	March 5, 2011	Mount Lemmon	Mount Lemmon Survey	NYS	1.0 km	MPC · JPL
510227	2011 EU_{44}	—	March 15, 1997	Kitt Peak	Spacewatch	·	910 m	MPC · JPL
510228	2011 EG_{45}	—	January 10, 2011	Mount Lemmon	Mount Lemmon Survey	·	750 m	MPC · JPL
510229	2011 EA_{55}	—	December 13, 2006	Kitt Peak	Spacewatch	NYS	770 m	MPC · JPL
510230	2011 ER_{67}	—	March 1, 2011	Mount Lemmon	Mount Lemmon Survey	MAS	510 m	MPC · JPL
510231	2011 EP_{70}	—	September 20, 2009	Mount Lemmon	Mount Lemmon Survey	V	570 m	MPC · JPL
510232	2011 ER_{76}	—	April 28, 1997	Kitt Peak	Spacewatch	·	830 m	MPC · JPL
510233	2011 EJ_{78}	—	January 29, 2011	Kitt Peak	Spacewatch	·	850 m	MPC · JPL
510234	2011 FN_{6}	—	March 11, 2007	Kitt Peak	Spacewatch	·	1.1 km	MPC · JPL
510235	2011 FT_{6}	—	March 25, 2011	Socorro	LINEAR	·	1.0 km	MPC · JPL
510236	2011 FM_{13}	—	March 27, 2011	Kitt Peak	Spacewatch	NYS	1.0 km	MPC · JPL
510237	2011 FY_{23}	—	March 28, 2011	Kitt Peak	Spacewatch	NYS	1.1 km	MPC · JPL
510238	2011 FC_{29}	—	March 30, 2011	Mount Lemmon	Mount Lemmon Survey	APO	250 m	MPC · JPL
510239	2011 FJ_{31}	—	February 27, 2007	Kitt Peak	Spacewatch	MAS	660 m	MPC · JPL
510240	2011 FD_{32}	—	March 28, 2011	Kitt Peak	Spacewatch	·	860 m	MPC · JPL
510241	2011 FK_{41}	—	March 2, 2011	Catalina	CSS	·	1 km	MPC · JPL
510242	2011 FJ_{53}	—	March 10, 2011	Kitt Peak	Spacewatch	MAS	620 m	MPC · JPL
510243	2011 FT_{55}	—	January 27, 2007	Mount Lemmon	Mount Lemmon Survey	·	1.0 km	MPC · JPL
510244	2011 FR_{63}	—	February 22, 2011	Kitt Peak	Spacewatch	·	750 m	MPC · JPL
510245	2011 FZ_{117}	—	April 2, 2011	Mount Lemmon	Mount Lemmon Survey	·	1.1 km	MPC · JPL
510246	2011 FY_{133}	—	January 27, 2007	Mount Lemmon	Mount Lemmon Survey	MAS	530 m	MPC · JPL
510247	2011 FA_{141}	—	January 24, 2007	Mount Lemmon	Mount Lemmon Survey	MAS	610 m	MPC · JPL
510248	2011 FP_{146}	—	February 8, 2011	Mount Lemmon	Mount Lemmon Survey	NYS	1.0 km	MPC · JPL
510249	2011 GF_{28}	—	March 24, 2011	Kitt Peak	Spacewatch	·	950 m	MPC · JPL
510250	2011 GC_{68}	—	April 15, 2011	Haleakala	Pan-STARRS 1	H	570 m	MPC · JPL
510251	2011 GN_{78}	—	March 27, 2011	Catalina	CSS	·	1.1 km	MPC · JPL
510252	2011 GP_{89}	—	April 3, 2011	Haleakala	Pan-STARRS 1	·	1.3 km	MPC · JPL
510253	2011 GQ_{89}	—	February 25, 2007	Kitt Peak	Spacewatch	NYS	920 m	MPC · JPL
510254	2011 HY	—	April 24, 2011	Haleakala	Pan-STARRS 1	H	460 m	MPC · JPL
510255	2011 HZ_{22}	—	April 2, 2011	Mount Lemmon	Mount Lemmon Survey	·	1.3 km	MPC · JPL
510256	2011 HX_{30}	—	April 22, 2011	Kitt Peak	Spacewatch	·	1.4 km	MPC · JPL
510257	2011 HV_{31}	—	April 3, 2011	Haleakala	Pan-STARRS 1	PHO	650 m	MPC · JPL
510258	2011 HG_{34}	—	September 4, 2008	Kitt Peak	Spacewatch	·	1.3 km	MPC · JPL
510259	2011 HZ_{35}	—	June 17, 2007	Kitt Peak	Spacewatch	·	1.1 km	MPC · JPL
510260	2011 HJ_{48}	—	April 13, 2011	Catalina	CSS	·	1.7 km	MPC · JPL
510261	2011 HE_{59}	—	February 17, 2007	Mount Lemmon	Mount Lemmon Survey	·	1.1 km	MPC · JPL
510262	2011 HJ_{61}	—	April 30, 2011	Mount Lemmon	Mount Lemmon Survey	APO +1km	1.3 km	MPC · JPL
510263	2011 HY_{61}	—	April 28, 2011	Haleakala	Pan-STARRS 1	H	360 m	MPC · JPL
510264	2011 HA_{62}	—	April 28, 2011	Haleakala	Pan-STARRS 1	H	580 m	MPC · JPL
510265	2011 HZ_{64}	—	December 12, 2006	Mount Lemmon	Mount Lemmon Survey	·	870 m	MPC · JPL
510266	2011 HD_{67}	—	April 23, 2011	Kitt Peak	Spacewatch	DOR	2.2 km	MPC · JPL
510267	2011 HF_{67}	—	April 23, 2011	Kitt Peak	Spacewatch	EUN	1.4 km	MPC · JPL
510268	2011 HS_{81}	—	March 26, 2011	Kitt Peak	Spacewatch	·	1.3 km	MPC · JPL
510269	2011 HW_{83}	—	February 25, 2007	Mount Lemmon	Mount Lemmon Survey	·	1.1 km	MPC · JPL
510270	2011 HE_{85}	—	April 12, 2011	Mount Lemmon	Mount Lemmon Survey	(194)	880 m	MPC · JPL
510271	2011 HH_{94}	—	April 13, 2011	Mount Lemmon	Mount Lemmon Survey	·	1.2 km	MPC · JPL
510272	2011 JQ_{8}	—	April 28, 2011	Haleakala	Pan-STARRS 1	·	2.3 km	MPC · JPL
510273	2011 JT_{17}	—	March 11, 2007	Kitt Peak	Spacewatch	NYS	1.2 km	MPC · JPL
510274	2011 KA_{8}	—	May 12, 2011	Mount Lemmon	Mount Lemmon Survey	·	1.0 km	MPC · JPL
510275	2011 KF_{8}	—	May 21, 2011	Haleakala	Pan-STARRS 1	EUN	1.1 km	MPC · JPL
510276	2011 KK_{8}	—	May 21, 2011	Haleakala	Pan-STARRS 1	·	1.4 km	MPC · JPL
510277	2011 KW_{8}	—	May 24, 2011	Mount Lemmon	Mount Lemmon Survey	H	390 m	MPC · JPL
510278	2011 KN_{10}	—	May 22, 2011	Kitt Peak	Spacewatch	·	1.7 km	MPC · JPL
510279	2011 KS_{11}	—	November 30, 2005	Mount Lemmon	Mount Lemmon Survey	·	1.3 km	MPC · JPL
510280	2011 KU_{17}	—	May 24, 2011	Mount Lemmon	Mount Lemmon Survey	EUN	950 m	MPC · JPL
510281	2011 KU_{22}	—	February 11, 2008	Črni Vrh	Mikuž, H.	H	540 m	MPC · JPL
510282	2011 KJ_{37}	—	February 9, 1999	Kitt Peak	Spacewatch	MAS	700 m	MPC · JPL
510283	2011 KB_{49}	—	May 25, 2011	Kitt Peak	Spacewatch	H	350 m	MPC · JPL
510284	2011 KC_{49}	—	May 30, 2011	Haleakala	Pan-STARRS 1	·	1.5 km	MPC · JPL
510285	2011 LK_{11}	—	May 23, 2011	Mount Lemmon	Mount Lemmon Survey	·	920 m	MPC · JPL
510286	2011 LM_{28}	—	February 9, 2010	WISE	WISE	·	4.8 km	MPC · JPL
510287	2011 LA_{29}	—	August 29, 2006	Catalina	CSS	·	2.5 km	MPC · JPL
510288	2011 ME_{3}	—	May 6, 2008	Mount Lemmon	Mount Lemmon Survey	H	560 m	MPC · JPL
510289	2011 OX_{1}	—	July 22, 2011	Haleakala	Pan-STARRS 1	L5	9.0 km	MPC · JPL
510290	2011 OH_{4}	—	July 24, 2011	La Sagra	OAM	·	1.8 km	MPC · JPL
510291	2011 OG_{5}	—	January 12, 2010	Mount Lemmon	Mount Lemmon Survey	H	470 m	MPC · JPL
510292	2011 OH_{5}	—	July 25, 2011	Haleakala	Pan-STARRS 1	·	1.2 km	MPC · JPL
510293	2011 OO_{12}	—	July 25, 2011	Haleakala	Pan-STARRS 1	MAR	1.2 km	MPC · JPL
510294	2011 OS_{16}	—	July 26, 2011	Haleakala	Pan-STARRS 1	·	1.6 km	MPC · JPL
510295	2011 OF_{17}	—	July 27, 2011	Haleakala	Pan-STARRS 1	·	1.8 km	MPC · JPL
510296	2011 OA_{18}	—	July 27, 2011	Haleakala	Pan-STARRS 1	H	470 m	MPC · JPL
510297	2011 OE_{28}	—	July 26, 2011	Haleakala	Pan-STARRS 1	·	2.2 km	MPC · JPL
510298	2011 PG_{5}	—	September 2, 2007	Mount Lemmon	Mount Lemmon Survey	HNS	1.3 km	MPC · JPL
510299	2011 PP_{13}	—	July 27, 2011	Haleakala	Pan-STARRS 1	H	620 m	MPC · JPL
510300	2011 PN_{14}	—	August 9, 2011	Haleakala	Pan-STARRS 1	H	610 m	MPC · JPL

== 510301–510400 ==
back to top

Designation			Discovery			Properties		Ref
Permanent	Provisional	Named after	Date	Site	Discoverer(s)	Category	Diam.	Ref
510301	2011 QD_{17}	—	August 20, 2011	Haleakala	Pan-STARRS 1	HOF	2.5 km	MPC · JPL
510302	2011 QS_{19}	—	June 8, 2011	Mount Lemmon	Mount Lemmon Survey	·	1.3 km	MPC · JPL
510303	2011 QM_{21}	—	December 20, 2009	Mount Lemmon	Mount Lemmon Survey	H	610 m	MPC · JPL
510304	2011 QQ_{29}	—	August 23, 2011	La Sagra	OAM	·	2.0 km	MPC · JPL
510305	2011 QA_{34}	—	July 31, 2011	La Sagra	OAM	·	2.3 km	MPC · JPL
510306	2011 QA_{38}	—	August 25, 2011	La Sagra	OAM	H	730 m	MPC · JPL
510307	2011 QC_{38}	—	August 26, 2011	Haleakala	Pan-STARRS 1	H	500 m	MPC · JPL
510308	2011 QX_{46}	—	October 20, 2007	Mount Lemmon	Mount Lemmon Survey	·	1.2 km	MPC · JPL
510309	2011 QT_{49}	—	February 14, 2010	Catalina	CSS	H	620 m	MPC · JPL
510310	2011 QJ_{59}	—	August 28, 2011	Haleakala	Pan-STARRS 1	·	2.1 km	MPC · JPL
510311	2011 QN_{63}	—	August 30, 2011	La Sagra	OAM	·	2.3 km	MPC · JPL
510312	2011 QK_{68}	—	August 2, 2011	Haleakala	Pan-STARRS 1	·	2.4 km	MPC · JPL
510313	2011 QW_{77}	—	October 20, 2006	Kitt Peak	Spacewatch	·	1.7 km	MPC · JPL
510314	2011 QS_{79}	—	August 23, 2011	Haleakala	Pan-STARRS 1	H	450 m	MPC · JPL
510315	2011 QX_{88}	—	September 19, 2006	Catalina	CSS	·	1.3 km	MPC · JPL
510316	2011 QL_{97}	—	August 31, 2011	Haleakala	Pan-STARRS 1	·	2.3 km	MPC · JPL
510317	2011 QN_{99}	—	February 9, 2005	Anderson Mesa	LONEOS	H	470 m	MPC · JPL
510318	2011 RN_{12}	—	September 4, 2011	Haleakala	Pan-STARRS 1	H	590 m	MPC · JPL
510319	2011 RZ_{12}	—	September 5, 2011	Haleakala	Pan-STARRS 1	·	1.3 km	MPC · JPL
510320	2011 RC_{18}	—	September 4, 2011	Haleakala	Pan-STARRS 1	·	2.5 km	MPC · JPL
510321	2011 RK_{19}	—	June 8, 2011	Haleakala	Pan-STARRS 1	MAR	1.3 km	MPC · JPL
510322	2011 SY_{6}	—	September 25, 2006	Kitt Peak	Spacewatch	·	1.6 km	MPC · JPL
510323	2011 SU_{8}	—	October 2, 2006	Mount Lemmon	Mount Lemmon Survey	·	1.9 km	MPC · JPL
510324	2011 SW_{19}	—	September 22, 2000	Socorro	LINEAR	·	2.7 km	MPC · JPL
510325	2011 SS_{22}	—	August 27, 2011	Haleakala	Pan-STARRS 1	·	1.6 km	MPC · JPL
510326	2011 SQ_{27}	—	October 19, 2006	Mount Lemmon	Mount Lemmon Survey	·	2.5 km	MPC · JPL
510327	2011 SD_{37}	—	September 20, 2011	Kitt Peak	Spacewatch	·	2.8 km	MPC · JPL
510328	2011 SQ_{37}	—	September 20, 2011	Kitt Peak	Spacewatch	H	720 m	MPC · JPL
510329	2011 SY_{47}	—	September 20, 2011	Mount Lemmon	Mount Lemmon Survey	BRA	1.2 km	MPC · JPL
510330	2011 SX_{48}	—	August 27, 2006	Kitt Peak	Spacewatch	KOR	1.0 km	MPC · JPL
510331	2011 SY_{63}	—	November 11, 2007	Mount Lemmon	Mount Lemmon Survey	EOS	2.2 km	MPC · JPL
510332	2011 SD_{69}	—	July 5, 2011	Haleakala	Pan-STARRS 1	·	1.8 km	MPC · JPL
510333	2011 SM_{70}	—	April 30, 2006	Kitt Peak	Spacewatch	·	1.5 km	MPC · JPL
510334	2011 SP_{72}	—	April 13, 1996	Kitt Peak	Spacewatch	·	1.4 km	MPC · JPL
510335	2011 SP_{73}	—	June 9, 2011	Haleakala	Pan-STARRS 1	·	2.4 km	MPC · JPL
510336	2011 SC_{75}	—	September 19, 2011	Haleakala	Pan-STARRS 1	615	1.1 km	MPC · JPL
510337	2011 SG_{82}	—	September 2, 2011	Haleakala	Pan-STARRS 1	AGN	1.3 km	MPC · JPL
510338	2011 SE_{88}	—	July 9, 2011	Haleakala	Pan-STARRS 1	EUN	1.3 km	MPC · JPL
510339	2011 SG_{108}	—	September 3, 2000	Socorro	LINEAR	·	2.4 km	MPC · JPL
510340	2011 SY_{108}	—	September 2, 2000	Anderson Mesa	LONEOS	TIR	3.5 km	MPC · JPL
510341	2011 SP_{111}	—	August 23, 2011	La Sagra	OAM	·	1.8 km	MPC · JPL
510342	2011 SK_{115}	—	August 29, 2011	La Sagra	OAM	·	2.1 km	MPC · JPL
510343	2011 SO_{115}	—	September 21, 2011	Catalina	CSS	KOR	1.5 km	MPC · JPL
510344	2011 SE_{121}	—	September 18, 2011	Mount Lemmon	Mount Lemmon Survey	·	2.7 km	MPC · JPL
510345	2011 SZ_{122}	—	April 9, 2008	Kitt Peak	Spacewatch	·	3.3 km	MPC · JPL
510346	2011 SE_{136}	—	September 30, 2006	Mount Lemmon	Mount Lemmon Survey	·	2.3 km	MPC · JPL
510347	2011 SN_{147}	—	September 18, 2006	Kitt Peak	Spacewatch	·	1.2 km	MPC · JPL
510348	2011 SF_{162}	—	September 23, 2011	Kitt Peak	Spacewatch	·	2.4 km	MPC · JPL
510349	2011 SJ_{163}	—	October 31, 2006	Kitt Peak	Spacewatch	·	1.3 km	MPC · JPL
510350	2011 SB_{166}	—	September 26, 2011	Kitt Peak	Spacewatch	EOS	1.8 km	MPC · JPL
510351	2011 SH_{167}	—	September 4, 2011	Haleakala	Pan-STARRS 1	·	2.0 km	MPC · JPL
510352	2011 SL_{197}	—	September 2, 2011	Haleakala	Pan-STARRS 1	KOR	1.3 km	MPC · JPL
510353	2011 SN_{197}	—	May 11, 2010	Mount Lemmon	Mount Lemmon Survey	·	1.4 km	MPC · JPL
510354	2011 SX_{201}	—	August 20, 2011	Haleakala	Pan-STARRS 1	·	1.7 km	MPC · JPL
510355	2011 SQ_{217}	—	September 2, 2011	Haleakala	Pan-STARRS 1	WIT	940 m	MPC · JPL
510356	2011 SK_{220}	—	November 20, 2006	Kitt Peak	Spacewatch	·	2.1 km	MPC · JPL
510357	2011 SS_{233}	—	September 23, 2011	Kitt Peak	Spacewatch	·	2.8 km	MPC · JPL
510358	2011 SS_{235}	—	September 27, 2011	Mount Lemmon	Mount Lemmon Survey	EOS	1.8 km	MPC · JPL
510359	2011 SH_{244}	—	September 15, 2006	Kitt Peak	Spacewatch	KOR	1.3 km	MPC · JPL
510360	2011 SD_{248}	—	September 26, 2006	Kitt Peak	Spacewatch	·	1.2 km	MPC · JPL
510361	2011 ST_{248}	—	October 17, 1995	Kitt Peak	Spacewatch	·	2.2 km	MPC · JPL
510362	2011 SM_{254}	—	July 16, 2010	WISE	WISE	·	2.9 km	MPC · JPL
510363	2011 SC_{259}	—	September 24, 2011	Haleakala	Pan-STARRS 1	·	2.3 km	MPC · JPL
510364	2011 SR_{263}	—	November 8, 2007	Mount Lemmon	Mount Lemmon Survey	·	1.7 km	MPC · JPL
510365	2011 ST_{266}	—	August 20, 2011	Haleakala	Pan-STARRS 1	·	1.8 km	MPC · JPL
510366	2011 SB_{275}	—	September 24, 2011	Haleakala	Pan-STARRS 1	·	2.0 km	MPC · JPL
510367	2011 TO_{4}	—	September 24, 2011	Haleakala	Pan-STARRS 1	·	1.7 km	MPC · JPL
510368	2011 TP_{4}	—	September 24, 2011	Haleakala	Pan-STARRS 1	·	2.4 km	MPC · JPL
510369	2011 TE_{8}	—	September 4, 2011	Haleakala	Pan-STARRS 1	·	2.0 km	MPC · JPL
510370	2011 UO	—	September 24, 2011	Haleakala	Pan-STARRS 1	EOS	1.8 km	MPC · JPL
510371	2011 UH_{9}	—	October 18, 2011	Mount Lemmon	Mount Lemmon Survey	·	2.4 km	MPC · JPL
510372	2011 UZ_{11}	—	September 24, 2011	Haleakala	Pan-STARRS 1	EOS	1.7 km	MPC · JPL
510373	2011 UP_{12}	—	September 23, 2011	Kitt Peak	Spacewatch	·	2.3 km	MPC · JPL
510374	2011 UF_{23}	—	September 25, 2005	Kitt Peak	Spacewatch	·	2.2 km	MPC · JPL
510375	2011 UL_{23}	—	September 23, 2011	Kitt Peak	Spacewatch	·	1.8 km	MPC · JPL
510376	2011 UO_{30}	—	September 27, 2011	Mount Lemmon	Mount Lemmon Survey	·	2.7 km	MPC · JPL
510377	2011 UK_{39}	—	September 24, 2011	Haleakala	Pan-STARRS 1	·	3.1 km	MPC · JPL
510378	2011 UF_{41}	—	September 22, 2011	Kitt Peak	Spacewatch	·	2.3 km	MPC · JPL
510379	2011 UG_{41}	—	September 26, 2011	Kitt Peak	Spacewatch	EOS	1.7 km	MPC · JPL
510380	2011 UO_{45}	—	September 24, 2011	Haleakala	Pan-STARRS 1	·	1.9 km	MPC · JPL
510381	2011 UW_{49}	—	October 18, 2011	Kitt Peak	Spacewatch	·	2.6 km	MPC · JPL
510382	2011 UL_{52}	—	October 18, 2011	Kitt Peak	Spacewatch	LIX	2.6 km	MPC · JPL
510383	2011 UX_{52}	—	December 16, 2006	Mount Lemmon	Mount Lemmon Survey	·	2.2 km	MPC · JPL
510384	2011 UC_{55}	—	September 2, 2010	La Sagra	OAM	·	4.1 km	MPC · JPL
510385	2011 US_{77}	—	October 19, 2011	Kitt Peak	Spacewatch	·	2.1 km	MPC · JPL
510386	2011 UH_{81}	—	October 19, 2011	Kitt Peak	Spacewatch	THM	1.7 km	MPC · JPL
510387	2011 UE_{83}	—	October 19, 2011	Kitt Peak	Spacewatch	·	1.9 km	MPC · JPL
510388	2011 UL_{83}	—	October 19, 2011	Kitt Peak	Spacewatch	·	2.9 km	MPC · JPL
510389	2011 UR_{83}	—	August 30, 2005	Kitt Peak	Spacewatch	·	1.9 km	MPC · JPL
510390	2011 UE_{95}	—	September 17, 2006	Kitt Peak	Spacewatch	KOR	1.1 km	MPC · JPL
510391	2011 UJ_{98}	—	October 20, 2011	Kitt Peak	Spacewatch	EOS	1.5 km	MPC · JPL
510392	2011 UO_{101}	—	November 19, 2006	Kitt Peak	Spacewatch	·	2.9 km	MPC · JPL
510393	2011 UT_{114}	—	October 24, 2011	Mount Lemmon	Mount Lemmon Survey	·	2.6 km	MPC · JPL
510394	2011 UU_{114}	—	October 24, 2011	Mount Lemmon	Mount Lemmon Survey	·	2.9 km	MPC · JPL
510395	2011 UG_{121}	—	December 5, 2007	Kitt Peak	Spacewatch	·	2.0 km	MPC · JPL
510396	2011 UX_{124}	—	September 20, 2011	Kitt Peak	Spacewatch	·	1.5 km	MPC · JPL
510397	2011 UH_{127}	—	October 20, 2011	Mount Lemmon	Mount Lemmon Survey	THM	1.7 km	MPC · JPL
510398	2011 UJ_{128}	—	September 25, 2011	Haleakala	Pan-STARRS 1	LIX	2.9 km	MPC · JPL
510399	2011 UH_{130}	—	September 21, 2011	Kitt Peak	Spacewatch	·	1.7 km	MPC · JPL
510400	2011 UF_{132}	—	October 29, 2005	Catalina	CSS	CYB	2.9 km	MPC · JPL

== 510401–510500 ==
back to top

Designation			Discovery			Properties		Ref
Permanent	Provisional	Named after	Date	Site	Discoverer(s)	Category	Diam.	Ref
510401	2011 UY_{134}	—	March 31, 2008	Kitt Peak	Spacewatch	·	2.6 km	MPC · JPL
510402	2011 UB_{140}	—	October 23, 2011	Kitt Peak	Spacewatch	·	2.3 km	MPC · JPL
510403	2011 UO_{140}	—	October 23, 2011	Kitt Peak	Spacewatch	·	2.3 km	MPC · JPL
510404	2011 UE_{151}	—	October 24, 2011	Haleakala	Pan-STARRS 1	EMA	2.9 km	MPC · JPL
510405	2011 UH_{154}	—	December 21, 2006	Kitt Peak	Spacewatch	·	2.9 km	MPC · JPL
510406	2011 UD_{160}	—	November 24, 2006	Kitt Peak	Spacewatch	·	2.3 km	MPC · JPL
510407	2011 UW_{161}	—	September 24, 2011	Mount Lemmon	Mount Lemmon Survey	·	2.3 km	MPC · JPL
510408	2011 UJ_{162}	—	October 24, 2011	Kitt Peak	Spacewatch	·	2.6 km	MPC · JPL
510409	2011 UU_{168}	—	December 31, 2007	Kitt Peak	Spacewatch	615	1.7 km	MPC · JPL
510410	2011 UT_{192}	—	October 28, 2011	Mount Lemmon	Mount Lemmon Survey	·	370 m	MPC · JPL
510411	2011 UL_{200}	—	December 15, 2006	Kitt Peak	Spacewatch	·	2.4 km	MPC · JPL
510412	2011 UF_{218}	—	September 28, 2011	Kitt Peak	Spacewatch	·	2.4 km	MPC · JPL
510413	2011 UH_{240}	—	April 14, 2004	Kitt Peak	Spacewatch	·	1.5 km	MPC · JPL
510414	2011 UD_{252}	—	October 26, 2011	Haleakala	Pan-STARRS 1	·	2.0 km	MPC · JPL
510415	2011 UY_{252}	—	October 26, 2011	Haleakala	Pan-STARRS 1	·	1.6 km	MPC · JPL
510416	2011 UJ_{257}	—	October 24, 2011	Haleakala	Pan-STARRS 1	·	2.2 km	MPC · JPL
510417	2011 UA_{264}	—	October 25, 2011	Haleakala	Pan-STARRS 1	·	3.4 km	MPC · JPL
510418	2011 UP_{265}	—	October 26, 2011	Haleakala	Pan-STARRS 1	·	2.8 km	MPC · JPL
510419	2011 UE_{269}	—	September 23, 2011	Haleakala	Pan-STARRS 1	·	3.0 km	MPC · JPL
510420	2011 UH_{275}	—	October 23, 2011	Kitt Peak	Spacewatch	·	2.6 km	MPC · JPL
510421	2011 UX_{280}	—	September 24, 2011	Mount Lemmon	Mount Lemmon Survey	·	1.9 km	MPC · JPL
510422	2011 UG_{294}	—	May 8, 2010	WISE	WISE	·	2.0 km	MPC · JPL
510423	2011 UX_{308}	—	November 22, 2006	Mount Lemmon	Mount Lemmon Survey	·	4.1 km	MPC · JPL
510424	2011 US_{310}	—	September 25, 2011	Haleakala	Pan-STARRS 1	·	1.6 km	MPC · JPL
510425	2011 UB_{320}	—	May 4, 2009	Mount Lemmon	Mount Lemmon Survey	·	3.4 km	MPC · JPL
510426	2011 UY_{332}	—	October 26, 2011	Haleakala	Pan-STARRS 1	·	3.0 km	MPC · JPL
510427	2011 UU_{333}	—	September 24, 2011	Haleakala	Pan-STARRS 1	EOS	2.2 km	MPC · JPL
510428	2011 UU_{334}	—	June 9, 2011	Haleakala	Pan-STARRS 1	·	960 m	MPC · JPL
510429	2011 UK_{336}	—	October 18, 1995	Kitt Peak	Spacewatch	3:2 · SHU	3.9 km	MPC · JPL
510430	2011 UV_{340}	—	September 25, 2006	Kitt Peak	Spacewatch	KOR	1.1 km	MPC · JPL
510431	2011 UD_{343}	—	December 21, 2006	Kitt Peak	Spacewatch	·	1.7 km	MPC · JPL
510432	2011 UM_{349}	—	October 19, 2011	Kitt Peak	Spacewatch	·	2.4 km	MPC · JPL
510433	2011 UZ_{369}	—	March 28, 2008	Mount Lemmon	Mount Lemmon Survey	·	1.4 km	MPC · JPL
510434	2011 UG_{387}	—	October 25, 2011	Haleakala	Pan-STARRS 1	VER	2.7 km	MPC · JPL
510435	2011 UM_{387}	—	October 25, 2011	Haleakala	Pan-STARRS 1	·	3.3 km	MPC · JPL
510436	2011 UM_{389}	—	September 24, 2011	Haleakala	Pan-STARRS 1	·	2.5 km	MPC · JPL
510437	2011 UL_{390}	—	September 14, 2005	Kitt Peak	Spacewatch	LIX	3.2 km	MPC · JPL
510438	2011 UG_{391}	—	October 26, 2011	Haleakala	Pan-STARRS 1	·	2.6 km	MPC · JPL
510439	2011 UU_{400}	—	July 28, 2005	Siding Spring	SSS	T_{j} (2.94)	3.6 km	MPC · JPL
510440	2011 UD_{414}	—	October 26, 2011	Haleakala	Pan-STARRS 1	(1298)	2.5 km	MPC · JPL
510441	2011 VX_{7}	—	October 25, 2011	Haleakala	Pan-STARRS 1	·	3.6 km	MPC · JPL
510442	2011 VM_{8}	—	November 17, 2006	Mount Lemmon	Mount Lemmon Survey	H	600 m	MPC · JPL
510443	2011 VJ_{14}	—	October 6, 2005	Kitt Peak	Spacewatch	·	2.3 km	MPC · JPL
510444	2011 VG_{15}	—	October 17, 2011	Kitt Peak	Spacewatch	VER	2.2 km	MPC · JPL
510445	2011 VF_{21}	—	March 12, 2008	Kitt Peak	Spacewatch	·	2.5 km	MPC · JPL
510446	2011 WG_{4}	—	October 26, 2011	Haleakala	Pan-STARRS 1	·	2.5 km	MPC · JPL
510447	2011 WE_{9}	—	October 26, 2011	Haleakala	Pan-STARRS 1	·	2.1 km	MPC · JPL
510448	2011 WQ_{9}	—	October 26, 2011	Haleakala	Pan-STARRS 1	·	2.7 km	MPC · JPL
510449	2011 WS_{10}	—	November 3, 2011	Kitt Peak	Spacewatch	·	2.0 km	MPC · JPL
510450	2011 WT_{11}	—	March 12, 2008	Mount Lemmon	Mount Lemmon Survey	·	1.4 km	MPC · JPL
510451	2011 WQ_{15}	—	October 18, 2011	Catalina	CSS	·	2.5 km	MPC · JPL
510452	2011 WC_{20}	—	October 25, 2011	Haleakala	Pan-STARRS 1	·	3.0 km	MPC · JPL
510453	2011 WS_{27}	—	October 23, 2011	Kitt Peak	Spacewatch	·	3.4 km	MPC · JPL
510454	2011 WG_{29}	—	October 25, 2011	Haleakala	Pan-STARRS 1	·	2.0 km	MPC · JPL
510455	2011 WW_{31}	—	February 23, 2007	Kitt Peak	Spacewatch	·	1.5 km	MPC · JPL
510456	2011 WZ_{35}	—	April 9, 2010	Kitt Peak	Spacewatch	·	2.5 km	MPC · JPL
510457	2011 WS_{38}	—	October 26, 2011	Haleakala	Pan-STARRS 1	·	2.0 km	MPC · JPL
510458	2011 WW_{39}	—	October 18, 2011	Haleakala	Pan-STARRS 1	·	2.5 km	MPC · JPL
510459	2011 WA_{50}	—	March 12, 2007	Catalina	CSS	·	2.5 km	MPC · JPL
510460	2011 WR_{50}	—	October 25, 2011	Haleakala	Pan-STARRS 1	EOS	2.3 km	MPC · JPL
510461	2011 WG_{55}	—	October 20, 2011	Mount Lemmon	Mount Lemmon Survey	·	1.8 km	MPC · JPL
510462	2011 WG_{59}	—	October 26, 2011	Haleakala	Pan-STARRS 1	EOS	1.9 km	MPC · JPL
510463	2011 WQ_{59}	—	October 26, 2011	Haleakala	Pan-STARRS 1	·	2.2 km	MPC · JPL
510464	2011 WU_{59}	—	October 26, 2011	Haleakala	Pan-STARRS 1	·	2.2 km	MPC · JPL
510465	2011 WT_{60}	—	March 4, 2008	Mount Lemmon	Mount Lemmon Survey	EOS	1.7 km	MPC · JPL
510466 Varna	2011 WK_{61}	Varna	November 24, 2011	Haleakala	Pan-STARRS 1	H	650 m	MPC · JPL
510467	2011 WR_{62}	—	October 24, 2011	Haleakala	Pan-STARRS 1	·	3.9 km	MPC · JPL
510468	2011 WF_{72}	—	November 1, 2011	Mount Lemmon	Mount Lemmon Survey	TIR	2.6 km	MPC · JPL
510469	2011 WT_{74}	—	June 1, 2005	Kitt Peak	Spacewatch	H	650 m	MPC · JPL
510470	2011 WC_{80}	—	October 26, 2011	Haleakala	Pan-STARRS 1	EOS	1.6 km	MPC · JPL
510471	2011 WZ_{84}	—	October 26, 2011	Haleakala	Pan-STARRS 1	·	2.3 km	MPC · JPL
510472	2011 WW_{89}	—	October 23, 2011	Haleakala	Pan-STARRS 1	·	2.9 km	MPC · JPL
510473	2011 WJ_{91}	—	November 26, 2011	Kitt Peak	Spacewatch	·	2.2 km	MPC · JPL
510474	2011 WC_{98}	—	October 29, 2005	Mount Lemmon	Mount Lemmon Survey	·	2.7 km	MPC · JPL
510475	2011 WV_{98}	—	October 7, 2005	Mount Lemmon	Mount Lemmon Survey	EOS	1.5 km	MPC · JPL
510476	2011 WK_{100}	—	October 23, 2011	Haleakala	Pan-STARRS 1	EOS	2.2 km	MPC · JPL
510477	2011 WO_{105}	—	October 25, 2011	Haleakala	Pan-STARRS 1	·	3.1 km	MPC · JPL
510478	2011 WB_{108}	—	January 24, 2007	Mount Lemmon	Mount Lemmon Survey	·	1.6 km	MPC · JPL
510479	2011 WY_{108}	—	September 24, 2011	Haleakala	Pan-STARRS 1	EOS	2.0 km	MPC · JPL
510480	2011 WX_{114}	—	October 26, 2011	Haleakala	Pan-STARRS 1	TIR	2.5 km	MPC · JPL
510481	2011 WL_{116}	—	October 25, 2011	Haleakala	Pan-STARRS 1	EOS	2.2 km	MPC · JPL
510482	2011 WU_{118}	—	November 18, 2011	Mount Lemmon	Mount Lemmon Survey	·	3.6 km	MPC · JPL
510483	2011 WT_{120}	—	November 24, 2011	Mount Lemmon	Mount Lemmon Survey	·	3.4 km	MPC · JPL
510484	2011 WD_{124}	—	November 1, 2006	Mount Lemmon	Mount Lemmon Survey	·	1.6 km	MPC · JPL
510485	2011 WU_{131}	—	October 26, 2011	Haleakala	Pan-STARRS 1	·	1.9 km	MPC · JPL
510486	2011 WO_{144}	—	April 14, 2008	Mount Lemmon	Mount Lemmon Survey	·	2.6 km	MPC · JPL
510487	2011 WX_{157}	—	November 29, 2011	Kitt Peak	Spacewatch	·	2.5 km	MPC · JPL
510488	2011 XX	—	October 24, 2011	Haleakala	Pan-STARRS 1	·	3.8 km	MPC · JPL
510489	2011 XA_{4}	—	December 6, 2011	Haleakala	Pan-STARRS 1	·	2.8 km	MPC · JPL
510490	2011 YE	—	December 16, 2011	Haleakala	Pan-STARRS 1	H	620 m	MPC · JPL
510491	2011 YU	—	January 9, 2002	Kitt Peak	Spacewatch	·	2.0 km	MPC · JPL
510492	2011 YG_{4}	—	November 24, 2011	Mount Lemmon	Mount Lemmon Survey	·	2.7 km	MPC · JPL
510493	2011 YF_{15}	—	December 26, 2011	Kitt Peak	Spacewatch	·	3.0 km	MPC · JPL
510494	2011 YD_{23}	—	May 13, 2008	Mount Lemmon	Mount Lemmon Survey	·	5.9 km	MPC · JPL
510495	2011 YA_{26}	—	December 25, 2011	Kitt Peak	Spacewatch	·	2.7 km	MPC · JPL
510496	2011 YX_{27}	—	December 28, 2011	Mount Lemmon	Mount Lemmon Survey	·	3.4 km	MPC · JPL
510497	2011 YY_{40}	—	December 25, 2011	Mount Lemmon	Mount Lemmon Survey	·	3.1 km	MPC · JPL
510498	2011 YD_{44}	—	December 27, 2011	Kitt Peak	Spacewatch	·	3.5 km	MPC · JPL
510499	2011 YX_{45}	—	December 27, 2011	Kitt Peak	Spacewatch	EUP	3.9 km	MPC · JPL
510500	2011 YK_{49}	—	December 25, 2011	Mount Lemmon	Mount Lemmon Survey	L4	9.0 km	MPC · JPL

== 510501–510600 ==
back to top

Designation			Discovery			Properties		Ref
Permanent	Provisional	Named after	Date	Site	Discoverer(s)	Category	Diam.	Ref
510501	2011 YG_{72}	—	December 27, 2011	Kitt Peak	Spacewatch	TIR	2.9 km	MPC · JPL
510502	2011 YD_{78}	—	January 24, 2007	Mount Lemmon	Mount Lemmon Survey	·	2.3 km	MPC · JPL
510503	2012 AG_{3}	—	December 13, 2004	Kitt Peak	Spacewatch	L5	10 km	MPC · JPL
510504	2012 BW_{3}	—	January 4, 2012	Kitt Peak	Spacewatch	·	2.4 km	MPC · JPL
510505	2012 BL_{15}	—	September 4, 2008	Kitt Peak	Spacewatch	L4	6.4 km	MPC · JPL
510506	2012 BC_{22}	—	December 10, 2005	Kitt Peak	Spacewatch	LUT	3.7 km	MPC · JPL
510507	2012 BQ_{25}	—	October 24, 2011	Mount Lemmon	Mount Lemmon Survey	ARM	3.7 km	MPC · JPL
510508	2012 BY_{34}	—	August 24, 2008	Kitt Peak	Spacewatch	L4	9.2 km	MPC · JPL
510509	2012 BJ_{35}	—	October 5, 2005	Catalina	CSS	·	2.6 km	MPC · JPL
510510	2012 BA_{44}	—	January 2, 2012	Kitt Peak	Spacewatch	·	2.9 km	MPC · JPL
510511	2012 BR_{53}	—	January 21, 2012	Haleakala	Pan-STARRS 1	·	2.6 km	MPC · JPL
510512	2012 BA_{58}	—	December 25, 2011	Kitt Peak	Spacewatch	·	3.7 km	MPC · JPL
510513	2012 BE_{79}	—	January 18, 2012	Kitt Peak	Spacewatch	EUP	3.5 km	MPC · JPL
510514	2012 BB_{95}	—	August 13, 2010	Kitt Peak	Spacewatch	·	2.8 km	MPC · JPL
510515	2012 BV_{96}	—	December 15, 2010	Mount Lemmon	Mount Lemmon Survey	L4	8.5 km	MPC · JPL
510516	2012 BU_{98}	—	January 26, 2012	Haleakala	Pan-STARRS 1	·	3.1 km	MPC · JPL
510517	2012 BN_{102}	—	January 18, 2012	Kitt Peak	Spacewatch	EOS	2.3 km	MPC · JPL
510518	2012 BE_{133}	—	January 1, 2012	Mount Lemmon	Mount Lemmon Survey	LIX	3.5 km	MPC · JPL
510519	2012 BB_{155}	—	September 12, 2007	Mount Lemmon	Mount Lemmon Survey	L4	7.7 km	MPC · JPL
510520	2012 BE_{155}	—	October 25, 2009	Kitt Peak	Spacewatch	L4	6.9 km	MPC · JPL
510521	2012 BT_{155}	—	January 19, 2012	Haleakala	Pan-STARRS 1	3:2	4.3 km	MPC · JPL
510522	2012 CQ_{2}	—	February 1, 2012	Kitt Peak	Spacewatch	·	2.9 km	MPC · JPL
510523	2012 CW_{38}	—	July 28, 2010	WISE	WISE	·	2.5 km	MPC · JPL
510524	2012 CE_{57}	—	January 18, 2012	Catalina	CSS	·	2.9 km	MPC · JPL
510525	2012 CC_{58}	—	January 4, 2006	Kitt Peak	Spacewatch	·	2.8 km	MPC · JPL
510526	2012 DH_{22}	—	February 20, 2012	Haleakala	Pan-STARRS 1	·	4.3 km	MPC · JPL
510527	2012 DJ_{77}	—	February 28, 2012	Haleakala	Pan-STARRS 1	·	700 m	MPC · JPL
510528	2012 DM_{87}	—	February 24, 2012	Haleakala	Pan-STARRS 1	·	810 m	MPC · JPL
510529	2012 EY_{11}	—	March 14, 2012	Mount Lemmon	Mount Lemmon Survey	APO · PHA	170 m	MPC · JPL
510530	2012 FV_{19}	—	February 22, 2012	Kitt Peak	Spacewatch	·	540 m	MPC · JPL
510531	2012 FR_{34}	—	February 28, 2012	Haleakala	Pan-STARRS 1	·	630 m	MPC · JPL
510532	2012 FK_{68}	—	February 28, 2012	Haleakala	Pan-STARRS 1	·	610 m	MPC · JPL
510533	2012 FE_{83}	—	March 2, 2012	Catalina	CSS	·	650 m	MPC · JPL
510534	2012 GW_{39}	—	September 16, 2003	Kitt Peak	Spacewatch	·	910 m	MPC · JPL
510535	2012 HS_{3}	—	March 29, 2012	Kitt Peak	Spacewatch	·	1.4 km	MPC · JPL
510536	2012 HU_{4}	—	March 29, 2012	Haleakala	Pan-STARRS 1	·	740 m	MPC · JPL
510537	2012 HT_{7}	—	March 13, 2012	Mount Lemmon	Mount Lemmon Survey	·	570 m	MPC · JPL
510538	2012 HL_{34}	—	April 15, 2012	Haleakala	Pan-STARRS 1	·	610 m	MPC · JPL
510539	2012 HK_{58}	—	April 17, 2012	Catalina	CSS	·	660 m	MPC · JPL
510540	2012 HD_{59}	—	August 1, 2009	Kitt Peak	Spacewatch	·	660 m	MPC · JPL
510541	2012 HX_{73}	—	March 29, 2012	Mount Lemmon	Mount Lemmon Survey	·	560 m	MPC · JPL
510542	2012 JD_{1}	—	June 21, 2009	Kitt Peak	Spacewatch	·	580 m	MPC · JPL
510543	2012 JK_{10}	—	April 15, 2008	Mount Lemmon	Mount Lemmon Survey	·	1.2 km	MPC · JPL
510544	2012 JM_{46}	—	April 8, 2008	Mount Lemmon	Mount Lemmon Survey	NYS	860 m	MPC · JPL
510545	2012 JC_{52}	—	April 28, 2012	Mount Lemmon	Mount Lemmon Survey	·	490 m	MPC · JPL
510546	2012 JJ_{67}	—	February 20, 2002	Kitt Peak	Spacewatch	L4	7.7 km	MPC · JPL
510547	2012 KB_{13}	—	April 20, 2012	Kitt Peak	Spacewatch	·	840 m	MPC · JPL
510548	2012 KE_{15}	—	February 11, 2008	Mount Lemmon	Mount Lemmon Survey	·	670 m	MPC · JPL
510549	2012 KJ_{17}	—	May 20, 2012	Mount Lemmon	Mount Lemmon Survey	·	650 m	MPC · JPL
510550	2012 KT_{43}	—	April 27, 2012	Haleakala	Pan-STARRS 1	·	980 m	MPC · JPL
510551	2012 KZ_{51}	—	May 21, 2012	Mount Lemmon	Mount Lemmon Survey	·	2.1 km	MPC · JPL
510552	2012 LC_{8}	—	October 12, 2009	Mount Lemmon	Mount Lemmon Survey	·	1.0 km	MPC · JPL
510553	2012 LB_{17}	—	June 11, 2012	Haleakala	Pan-STARRS 1	·	1.0 km	MPC · JPL
510554	2012 LX_{17}	—	May 21, 2012	Haleakala	Pan-STARRS 1	V	550 m	MPC · JPL
510555	2012 LM_{26}	—	April 23, 2012	Mount Lemmon	Mount Lemmon Survey	BAR	980 m	MPC · JPL
510556	2012 MS	—	May 16, 2012	Kitt Peak	Spacewatch	·	1.1 km	MPC · JPL
510557	2012 MR_{11}	—	June 28, 2012	Siding Spring	SSS	BAR	1.5 km	MPC · JPL
510558	2012 MS_{13}	—	March 13, 2008	Kitt Peak	Spacewatch	·	640 m	MPC · JPL
510559	2012 PZ_{3}	—	August 8, 2012	Haleakala	Pan-STARRS 1	·	1.3 km	MPC · JPL
510560	2012 PP_{7}	—	May 21, 2012	Mount Lemmon	Mount Lemmon Survey	JUN	1.0 km	MPC · JPL
510561	2012 PV_{9}	—	August 8, 2012	Haleakala	Pan-STARRS 1	·	1.0 km	MPC · JPL
510562	2012 PG_{12}	—	March 13, 2011	Kitt Peak	Spacewatch	·	1.7 km	MPC · JPL
510563	2012 PA_{23}	—	September 23, 2008	Kitt Peak	Spacewatch	·	1.5 km	MPC · JPL
510564	2012 PL_{24}	—	August 13, 2012	Haleakala	Pan-STARRS 1	L5	8.0 km	MPC · JPL
510565	2012 PS_{31}	—	August 12, 2012	Haleakala	Pan-STARRS 1	·	1.9 km	MPC · JPL
510566	2012 PK_{37}	—	August 14, 2012	Haleakala	Pan-STARRS 1	·	1.2 km	MPC · JPL
510567	2012 PN_{44}	—	June 26, 2011	Mount Lemmon	Mount Lemmon Survey	L5	10 km	MPC · JPL
510568	2012 QF_{10}	—	March 9, 2007	Mount Lemmon	Mount Lemmon Survey	L5	9.3 km	MPC · JPL
510569	2012 QR_{15}	—	August 11, 2012	Siding Spring	SSS	·	1.2 km	MPC · JPL
510570	2012 QW_{29}	—	January 26, 2007	Kitt Peak	Spacewatch	·	1.4 km	MPC · JPL
510571	2012 QB_{32}	—	May 7, 2007	Kitt Peak	Spacewatch	·	1.4 km	MPC · JPL
510572	2012 QS_{33}	—	August 10, 2012	Kitt Peak	Spacewatch	JUN	930 m	MPC · JPL
510573	2012 QN_{52}	—	August 24, 2012	Kitt Peak	Spacewatch	L5	8.2 km	MPC · JPL
510574	2012 RT	—	August 26, 2012	Haleakala	Pan-STARRS 1	JUN	740 m	MPC · JPL
510575	2012 RU_{9}	—	September 7, 2008	Mount Lemmon	Mount Lemmon Survey	(1547)	1.1 km	MPC · JPL
510576	2012 RW_{23}	—	May 31, 2011	Mount Lemmon	Mount Lemmon Survey	·	1.4 km	MPC · JPL
510577	2012 RX_{32}	—	August 25, 1995	Kitt Peak	Spacewatch	EUN	960 m	MPC · JPL
510578	2012 RD_{36}	—	September 15, 2012	Catalina	CSS	·	2.1 km	MPC · JPL
510579	2012 RF_{40}	—	March 28, 2011	Mount Lemmon	Mount Lemmon Survey	·	1.4 km	MPC · JPL
510580	2012 RE_{41}	—	September 15, 2012	Catalina	CSS	(1547)	1.8 km	MPC · JPL
510581	2012 SP	—	April 2, 2011	Mount Lemmon	Mount Lemmon Survey	·	1.5 km	MPC · JPL
510582	2012 ST	—	October 31, 2008	Mount Lemmon	Mount Lemmon Survey	ADE	1.5 km	MPC · JPL
510583	2012 SQ_{5}	—	October 13, 1999	Kitt Peak	Spacewatch	·	1.2 km	MPC · JPL
510584	2012 SC_{10}	—	August 26, 2012	Haleakala	Pan-STARRS 1	EUN	950 m	MPC · JPL
510585	2012 SJ_{10}	—	August 14, 2012	Haleakala	Pan-STARRS 1	MAS	640 m	MPC · JPL
510586	2012 SH_{13}	—	September 27, 2003	Kitt Peak	Spacewatch	·	1.6 km	MPC · JPL
510587	2012 SU_{15}	—	September 17, 2012	Kitt Peak	Spacewatch	MRX	1.0 km	MPC · JPL
510588	2012 SG_{16}	—	September 24, 2008	Mount Lemmon	Mount Lemmon Survey	·	920 m	MPC · JPL
510589	2012 SG_{19}	—	September 21, 2008	Mount Lemmon	Mount Lemmon Survey	·	1.2 km	MPC · JPL
510590	2012 SH_{25}	—	September 17, 2012	Mount Lemmon	Mount Lemmon Survey	AGN	1.1 km	MPC · JPL
510591	2012 SA_{32}	—	August 21, 2011	Haleakala	Pan-STARRS 1	L5	7.5 km	MPC · JPL
510592	2012 SE_{38}	—	January 31, 1997	Kitt Peak	Spacewatch	(29841)	1.2 km	MPC · JPL
510593	2012 SU_{52}	—	September 23, 2008	Kitt Peak	Spacewatch	(5)	1.1 km	MPC · JPL
510594	2012 SJ_{57}	—	September 15, 2012	Kitt Peak	Spacewatch	·	1.4 km	MPC · JPL
510595	2012 SQ_{64}	—	July 3, 2003	Kitt Peak	Spacewatch	·	1.6 km	MPC · JPL
510596	2012 SB_{65}	—	December 6, 2008	Mount Lemmon	Mount Lemmon Survey	JUN	950 m	MPC · JPL
510597	2012 SC_{68}	—	September 21, 2012	Kitt Peak	Spacewatch	·	1.8 km	MPC · JPL
510598	2012 TK_{2}	—	August 13, 2012	Kitt Peak	Spacewatch	·	1.5 km	MPC · JPL
510599	2012 TL_{12}	—	May 24, 2011	Haleakala	Pan-STARRS 1	·	1.3 km	MPC · JPL
510600	2012 TK_{15}	—	September 18, 2012	Kitt Peak	Spacewatch	H	490 m	MPC · JPL

== 510601–510700 ==
back to top

Designation			Discovery			Properties		Ref
Permanent	Provisional	Named after	Date	Site	Discoverer(s)	Category	Diam.	Ref
510601	2012 TJ_{18}	—	October 6, 2012	Mount Lemmon	Mount Lemmon Survey	·	1.8 km	MPC · JPL
510602	2012 TB_{19}	—	October 6, 2012	Haleakala	Pan-STARRS 1	ADE	1.7 km	MPC · JPL
510603	2012 TA_{27}	—	November 2, 2008	Mount Lemmon	Mount Lemmon Survey	·	1.3 km	MPC · JPL
510604	2012 TK_{33}	—	October 3, 2003	Kitt Peak	Spacewatch	WIT	1.1 km	MPC · JPL
510605	2012 TT_{34}	—	August 25, 2012	Haleakala	Pan-STARRS 1	·	2.1 km	MPC · JPL
510606	2012 TU_{37}	—	December 17, 2003	Socorro	LINEAR	·	1.9 km	MPC · JPL
510607	2012 TP_{51}	—	September 30, 2005	Mount Lemmon	Mount Lemmon Survey	·	910 m	MPC · JPL
510608	2012 TO_{52}	—	October 8, 2012	Mount Lemmon	Mount Lemmon Survey	L5	9.5 km	MPC · JPL
510609	2012 TF_{59}	—	December 29, 2008	Kitt Peak	Spacewatch	·	1.5 km	MPC · JPL
510610	2012 TS_{70}	—	January 1, 2009	Kitt Peak	Spacewatch	DOR	1.9 km	MPC · JPL
510611	2012 TN_{85}	—	October 6, 2012	Mount Lemmon	Mount Lemmon Survey	AGN	930 m	MPC · JPL
510612	2012 TQ_{96}	—	October 8, 2012	Kitt Peak	Spacewatch	·	1.3 km	MPC · JPL
510613	2012 TT_{96}	—	August 10, 2007	Kitt Peak	Spacewatch	·	1.6 km	MPC · JPL
510614	2012 TT_{101}	—	November 21, 2008	Kitt Peak	Spacewatch	·	1.2 km	MPC · JPL
510615	2012 TD_{104}	—	October 9, 2008	Kitt Peak	Spacewatch	·	2.3 km	MPC · JPL
510616	2012 TO_{105}	—	October 9, 2008	Kitt Peak	Spacewatch	·	1.1 km	MPC · JPL
510617	2012 TH_{125}	—	December 29, 2005	Kitt Peak	Spacewatch	·	990 m	MPC · JPL
510618	2012 TX_{130}	—	August 12, 2012	Kitt Peak	Spacewatch	·	1.5 km	MPC · JPL
510619	2012 TA_{135}	—	October 6, 2012	Haleakala	Pan-STARRS 1	L5	8.7 km	MPC · JPL
510620	2012 TJ_{138}	—	September 15, 2012	Mount Lemmon	Mount Lemmon Survey	·	1.3 km	MPC · JPL
510621	2012 TA_{142}	—	November 7, 2008	Mount Lemmon	Mount Lemmon Survey	·	1.1 km	MPC · JPL
510622	2012 TZ_{153}	—	September 22, 2012	Kitt Peak	Spacewatch	MRX	820 m	MPC · JPL
510623	2012 TU_{158}	—	October 8, 2012	Mount Lemmon	Mount Lemmon Survey	AST	1.5 km	MPC · JPL
510624	2012 TV_{161}	—	September 10, 2007	Kitt Peak	Spacewatch	·	1.4 km	MPC · JPL
510625	2012 TX_{164}	—	September 17, 2012	Kitt Peak	Spacewatch	L5	7.1 km	MPC · JPL
510626	2012 TP_{168}	—	October 8, 2012	Haleakala	Pan-STARRS 1	NEM	2.4 km	MPC · JPL
510627	2012 TX_{169}	—	September 19, 2012	Mount Lemmon	Mount Lemmon Survey	·	1.5 km	MPC · JPL
510628	2012 TP_{174}	—	September 25, 2012	Catalina	CSS	·	1.2 km	MPC · JPL
510629	2012 TY_{174}	—	January 18, 2005	Kitt Peak	Spacewatch	·	1.1 km	MPC · JPL
510630	2012 TM_{175}	—	September 16, 2003	Kitt Peak	Spacewatch	·	1.3 km	MPC · JPL
510631	2012 TU_{176}	—	October 23, 2008	Mount Lemmon	Mount Lemmon Survey	·	900 m	MPC · JPL
510632	2012 TT_{177}	—	October 8, 2012	Mount Lemmon	Mount Lemmon Survey	L5	6.2 km	MPC · JPL
510633	2012 TF_{189}	—	October 10, 2012	Kitt Peak	Spacewatch	·	1.3 km	MPC · JPL
510634	2012 TN_{201}	—	November 18, 2008	Catalina	CSS	·	1.1 km	MPC · JPL
510635	2012 TT_{206}	—	October 17, 2003	Kitt Peak	Spacewatch	·	1.3 km	MPC · JPL
510636	2012 TT_{207}	—	May 30, 2011	Haleakala	Pan-STARRS 1	·	1.7 km	MPC · JPL
510637	2012 TB_{208}	—	October 11, 2012	Kitt Peak	Spacewatch	·	1.3 km	MPC · JPL
510638	2012 TQ_{208}	—	November 17, 2009	Kitt Peak	Spacewatch	·	590 m	MPC · JPL
510639	2012 TS_{210}	—	November 8, 2008	Kitt Peak	Spacewatch	·	1.3 km	MPC · JPL
510640	2012 TV_{213}	—	October 11, 2012	Haleakala	Pan-STARRS 1	·	2.2 km	MPC · JPL
510641	2012 TA_{216}	—	September 14, 2012	Mount Lemmon	Mount Lemmon Survey	·	1.9 km	MPC · JPL
510642	2012 TQ_{216}	—	September 19, 2012	Mount Lemmon	Mount Lemmon Survey	·	1.6 km	MPC · JPL
510643	2012 TC_{219}	—	October 14, 2012	Catalina	CSS	·	2.3 km	MPC · JPL
510644	2012 TM_{219}	—	October 8, 2012	Haleakala	Pan-STARRS 1	H	410 m	MPC · JPL
510645	2012 TF_{221}	—	October 29, 2008	Kitt Peak	Spacewatch	·	860 m	MPC · JPL
510646	2012 TV_{222}	—	October 20, 2008	Kitt Peak	Spacewatch	·	1.0 km	MPC · JPL
510647	2012 TZ_{233}	—	October 6, 2012	Haleakala	Pan-STARRS 1	·	1.3 km	MPC · JPL
510648	2012 TG_{235}	—	September 21, 2012	Catalina	CSS	·	1.9 km	MPC · JPL
510649	2012 TJ_{235}	—	October 7, 2012	Haleakala	Pan-STARRS 1	·	1.6 km	MPC · JPL
510650	2012 TS_{238}	—	February 3, 2009	Mount Lemmon	Mount Lemmon Survey	·	2.8 km	MPC · JPL
510651	2012 TE_{241}	—	October 8, 2012	Kitt Peak	Spacewatch	·	1.8 km	MPC · JPL
510652	2012 TG_{244}	—	October 8, 2012	Haleakala	Pan-STARRS 1	·	1.3 km	MPC · JPL
510653	2012 TH_{256}	—	October 18, 2007	Kitt Peak	Spacewatch	KOR	1.1 km	MPC · JPL
510654	2012 TV_{260}	—	October 7, 2012	Haleakala	Pan-STARRS 1	·	1.7 km	MPC · JPL
510655	2012 TF_{266}	—	September 15, 2012	Mount Lemmon	Mount Lemmon Survey	EOS	1.9 km	MPC · JPL
510656	2012 TN_{268}	—	October 10, 2012	Haleakala	Pan-STARRS 1	EUN	1.0 km	MPC · JPL
510657	2012 TC_{282}	—	October 11, 2012	Mount Lemmon	Mount Lemmon Survey	·	1.2 km	MPC · JPL
510658	2012 TK_{284}	—	January 17, 2007	Kitt Peak	Spacewatch	·	1.0 km	MPC · JPL
510659	2012 TX_{286}	—	October 8, 2012	Haleakala	Pan-STARRS 1	·	1.7 km	MPC · JPL
510660	2012 TC_{293}	—	December 22, 2008	Kitt Peak	Spacewatch	·	1.5 km	MPC · JPL
510661	2012 TD_{296}	—	August 28, 2012	Mount Lemmon	Mount Lemmon Survey	·	1.3 km	MPC · JPL
510662	2012 TW_{300}	—	December 2, 2008	Kitt Peak	Spacewatch	TIN	1.3 km	MPC · JPL
510663	2012 TU_{306}	—	October 9, 2012	Haleakala	Pan-STARRS 1	·	1.4 km	MPC · JPL
510664	2012 TL_{308}	—	October 10, 2012	Haleakala	Pan-STARRS 1	·	1.7 km	MPC · JPL
510665	2012 TS_{312}	—	September 16, 2012	Kitt Peak	Spacewatch	·	1.4 km	MPC · JPL
510666	2012 TM_{322}	—	September 23, 2012	La Sagra	OAM	MAR	1.4 km	MPC · JPL
510667	2012 UB_{1}	—	August 14, 2012	Siding Spring	SSS	·	1.6 km	MPC · JPL
510668	2012 UO_{6}	—	September 18, 2012	Kitt Peak	Spacewatch	·	1.8 km	MPC · JPL
510669	2012 UR_{7}	—	October 7, 2012	Haleakala	Pan-STARRS 1	HOF	2.2 km	MPC · JPL
510670	2012 UO_{12}	—	November 1, 2008	Mount Lemmon	Mount Lemmon Survey	·	1.0 km	MPC · JPL
510671	2012 UM_{15}	—	October 8, 2012	Haleakala	Pan-STARRS 1	·	760 m	MPC · JPL
510672	2012 UP_{21}	—	September 12, 2007	Mount Lemmon	Mount Lemmon Survey	·	1.5 km	MPC · JPL
510673	2012 UL_{26}	—	October 1, 2003	Kitt Peak	Spacewatch	·	1.2 km	MPC · JPL
510674	2012 UL_{28}	—	October 18, 2003	Kitt Peak	Spacewatch	·	1.4 km	MPC · JPL
510675	2012 UK_{38}	—	October 17, 2012	Kitt Peak	Spacewatch	·	1.4 km	MPC · JPL
510676	2012 UM_{38}	—	October 17, 2012	Kitt Peak	Spacewatch	·	1.6 km	MPC · JPL
510677	2012 UO_{43}	—	October 17, 2012	Mount Lemmon	Mount Lemmon Survey	·	1.3 km	MPC · JPL
510678	2012 UJ_{47}	—	October 18, 2012	Haleakala	Pan-STARRS 1	·	1.7 km	MPC · JPL
510679	2012 UY_{48}	—	November 24, 2008	Kitt Peak	Spacewatch	·	1.2 km	MPC · JPL
510680	2012 UH_{49}	—	October 8, 2012	Kitt Peak	Spacewatch	·	1.6 km	MPC · JPL
510681	2012 UJ_{51}	—	November 30, 2008	Mount Lemmon	Mount Lemmon Survey	·	1.2 km	MPC · JPL
510682	2012 UW_{57}	—	October 22, 2003	Kitt Peak	Spacewatch	·	1.7 km	MPC · JPL
510683	2012 UY_{57}	—	December 29, 2008	Kitt Peak	Spacewatch	AEO	1.1 km	MPC · JPL
510684	2012 UM_{66}	—	November 21, 2003	Kitt Peak	Spacewatch	·	1.2 km	MPC · JPL
510685	2012 UB_{67}	—	October 20, 2012	Haleakala	Pan-STARRS 1	·	1.7 km	MPC · JPL
510686	2012 UH_{90}	—	October 21, 2012	Haleakala	Pan-STARRS 1	·	1.1 km	MPC · JPL
510687	2012 UG_{107}	—	September 21, 2012	Mount Lemmon	Mount Lemmon Survey	·	1.4 km	MPC · JPL
510688	2012 UL_{110}	—	July 26, 2011	Haleakala	Pan-STARRS 1	HOF	2.9 km	MPC · JPL
510689	2012 UA_{115}	—	September 22, 2008	Kitt Peak	Spacewatch	·	1.1 km	MPC · JPL
510690	2012 UQ_{123}	—	October 22, 2012	Haleakala	Pan-STARRS 1	·	1.0 km	MPC · JPL
510691	2012 UC_{126}	—	October 22, 2012	Haleakala	Pan-STARRS 1	·	1.4 km	MPC · JPL
510692	2012 UD_{126}	—	October 22, 2012	Haleakala	Pan-STARRS 1	·	1.7 km	MPC · JPL
510693	2012 UP_{126}	—	September 19, 2003	Kitt Peak	Spacewatch	·	1.1 km	MPC · JPL
510694	2012 UX_{131}	—	October 25, 2003	Socorro	LINEAR	·	1.6 km	MPC · JPL
510695	2012 UF_{133}	—	October 10, 2012	Haleakala	Pan-STARRS 1	·	1.5 km	MPC · JPL
510696	2012 UF_{135}	—	September 22, 2012	Kitt Peak	Spacewatch	·	1.5 km	MPC · JPL
510697	2012 UF_{137}	—	January 16, 2009	Mount Lemmon	Mount Lemmon Survey	·	1.5 km	MPC · JPL
510698	2012 UE_{138}	—	October 15, 2012	Kitt Peak	Spacewatch	·	1.5 km	MPC · JPL
510699	2012 UC_{146}	—	December 2, 2008	Kitt Peak	Spacewatch	·	1.3 km	MPC · JPL
510700	2012 UA_{152}	—	October 21, 2012	Kitt Peak	Spacewatch	·	1.2 km	MPC · JPL

== 510701–510800 ==
back to top

Designation			Discovery			Properties		Ref
Permanent	Provisional	Named after	Date	Site	Discoverer(s)	Category	Diam.	Ref
510701	2012 UK_{153}	—	October 21, 2012	Haleakala	Pan-STARRS 1	·	1.4 km	MPC · JPL
510702	2012 UE_{160}	—	October 21, 2012	Haleakala	Pan-STARRS 1	·	1.5 km	MPC · JPL
510703	2012 US_{165}	—	October 10, 2012	Haleakala	Pan-STARRS 1	EUN	1.2 km	MPC · JPL
510704	2012 UN_{169}	—	December 14, 2004	Campo Imperatore	CINEOS	·	2.0 km	MPC · JPL
510705	2012 UP_{169}	—	December 19, 2003	Socorro	LINEAR	·	1.9 km	MPC · JPL
510706	2012 UT_{178}	—	October 21, 2012	Kitt Peak	Spacewatch	AGN	930 m	MPC · JPL
510707	2012 UY_{178}	—	October 18, 2012	Haleakala	Pan-STARRS 1	·	1.3 km	MPC · JPL
510708	2012 UC_{179}	—	October 22, 2012	Mount Lemmon	Mount Lemmon Survey	·	1.0 km	MPC · JPL
510709	2012 VJ	—	October 6, 2012	Haleakala	Pan-STARRS 1	·	2.2 km	MPC · JPL
510710	2012 VS_{2}	—	October 30, 2008	Kitt Peak	Spacewatch	EUN	1.1 km	MPC · JPL
510711	2012 VR_{9}	—	September 15, 2012	Mount Lemmon	Mount Lemmon Survey	·	1.3 km	MPC · JPL
510712	2012 VF_{11}	—	October 15, 2012	Mount Lemmon	Mount Lemmon Survey	·	1.3 km	MPC · JPL
510713	2012 VG_{21}	—	April 9, 2006	Mount Lemmon	Mount Lemmon Survey	·	960 m	MPC · JPL
510714	2012 VY_{22}	—	October 8, 2012	Kitt Peak	Spacewatch	·	1.0 km	MPC · JPL
510715	2012 VL_{30}	—	September 3, 2007	Mount Lemmon	Mount Lemmon Survey	·	1.9 km	MPC · JPL
510716	2012 VY_{32}	—	November 6, 2012	Haleakala	Pan-STARRS 1	H	430 m	MPC · JPL
510717	2012 VJ_{35}	—	October 21, 2012	Haleakala	Pan-STARRS 1	·	2.3 km	MPC · JPL
510718	2012 VP_{37}	—	February 14, 2005	Kitt Peak	Spacewatch	·	1.6 km	MPC · JPL
510719	2012 VZ_{38}	—	December 31, 2008	Catalina	CSS	·	1.5 km	MPC · JPL
510720	2012 VJ_{40}	—	July 25, 2011	Haleakala	Pan-STARRS 1	NEM	2.0 km	MPC · JPL
510721	2012 VL_{48}	—	October 18, 2012	Haleakala	Pan-STARRS 1	HOF	2.2 km	MPC · JPL
510722	2012 VC_{60}	—	April 9, 2010	Kitt Peak	Spacewatch	·	1.2 km	MPC · JPL
510723	2012 VN_{61}	—	November 16, 1999	Kitt Peak	Spacewatch	·	1.4 km	MPC · JPL
510724	2012 VJ_{74}	—	October 21, 2012	Haleakala	Pan-STARRS 1	·	1.4 km	MPC · JPL
510725	2012 VQ_{77}	—	September 19, 2012	Mount Lemmon	Mount Lemmon Survey	·	1.1 km	MPC · JPL
510726	2012 VP_{84}	—	November 7, 2012	Kitt Peak	Spacewatch	·	2.3 km	MPC · JPL
510727	2012 VR_{92}	—	November 18, 2007	Mount Lemmon	Mount Lemmon Survey	·	1.5 km	MPC · JPL
510728	2012 VZ_{92}	—	May 26, 2011	Mount Lemmon	Mount Lemmon Survey	·	2.3 km	MPC · JPL
510729	2012 VO_{94}	—	October 16, 2012	Kitt Peak	Spacewatch	·	1.4 km	MPC · JPL
510730	2012 VT_{97}	—	October 15, 2012	Kitt Peak	Spacewatch	·	1.9 km	MPC · JPL
510731	2012 VG_{99}	—	October 6, 2012	Haleakala	Pan-STARRS 1	ADE	1.9 km	MPC · JPL
510732	2012 VR_{102}	—	October 9, 2012	Mount Lemmon	Mount Lemmon Survey	·	2.6 km	MPC · JPL
510733	2012 VE_{103}	—	November 13, 2012	Kitt Peak	Spacewatch	H	470 m	MPC · JPL
510734	2012 VK_{105}	—	October 27, 2003	Kitt Peak	Spacewatch	GAL	1.5 km	MPC · JPL
510735	2012 VR_{111}	—	October 10, 2007	Kitt Peak	Spacewatch	·	1.8 km	MPC · JPL
510736	2012 VF_{114}	—	November 1, 2014	Mount Lemmon	Mount Lemmon Survey	L5	9.7 km	MPC · JPL
510737	2012 VL_{114}	—	December 4, 2007	Kitt Peak	Spacewatch	KOR	1.5 km	MPC · JPL
510738	2012 WP_{2}	—	October 20, 2012	Kitt Peak	Spacewatch	·	1.2 km	MPC · JPL
510739	2012 WS_{5}	—	November 7, 2007	Kitt Peak	Spacewatch	·	1.7 km	MPC · JPL
510740	2012 WG_{13}	—	November 19, 2012	Kitt Peak	Spacewatch	·	1.3 km	MPC · JPL
510741	2012 WM_{14}	—	October 9, 2007	Mount Lemmon	Mount Lemmon Survey	·	1.4 km	MPC · JPL
510742	2012 WN_{20}	—	December 22, 2008	Kitt Peak	Spacewatch	·	1.3 km	MPC · JPL
510743	2012 XX_{1}	—	September 25, 2012	Mount Lemmon	Mount Lemmon Survey	·	1.6 km	MPC · JPL
510744	2012 XH_{18}	—	November 12, 2012	Mount Lemmon	Mount Lemmon Survey	EOS	1.7 km	MPC · JPL
510745	2012 XZ_{29}	—	January 18, 2009	Kitt Peak	Spacewatch	·	1.5 km	MPC · JPL
510746	2012 XB_{30}	—	June 10, 2011	Mount Lemmon	Mount Lemmon Survey	·	2.9 km	MPC · JPL
510747	2012 XK_{39}	—	November 12, 2012	Mount Lemmon	Mount Lemmon Survey	·	2.1 km	MPC · JPL
510748	2012 XX_{41}	—	November 4, 2012	Kitt Peak	Spacewatch	·	2.9 km	MPC · JPL
510749	2012 XL_{47}	—	November 26, 2012	Mount Lemmon	Mount Lemmon Survey	EMA	2.5 km	MPC · JPL
510750	2012 XQ_{50}	—	October 21, 2012	Haleakala	Pan-STARRS 1	·	1.3 km	MPC · JPL
510751	2012 XW_{53}	—	December 22, 2008	Kitt Peak	Spacewatch	·	1.3 km	MPC · JPL
510752	2012 XK_{56}	—	December 10, 2012	Haleakala	Pan-STARRS 1	H	450 m	MPC · JPL
510753	2012 XW_{62}	—	November 14, 2012	Mount Lemmon	Mount Lemmon Survey	·	2.3 km	MPC · JPL
510754	2012 XL_{94}	—	December 4, 2012	Mount Lemmon	Mount Lemmon Survey	·	1.5 km	MPC · JPL
510755	2012 XW_{110}	—	November 13, 2012	Mount Lemmon	Mount Lemmon Survey	H	550 m	MPC · JPL
510756	2012 XF_{123}	—	February 3, 2008	Mount Lemmon	Mount Lemmon Survey	·	2.9 km	MPC · JPL
510757	2012 XH_{126}	—	October 20, 2012	Kitt Peak	Spacewatch	·	1.5 km	MPC · JPL
510758	2012 XJ_{128}	—	September 28, 2006	Catalina	CSS	·	2.7 km	MPC · JPL
510759	2012 XA_{138}	—	October 23, 2012	Mount Lemmon	Mount Lemmon Survey	·	1.5 km	MPC · JPL
510760	2012 XQ_{152}	—	September 25, 2011	Haleakala	Pan-STARRS 1	·	2.0 km	MPC · JPL
510761	2012 YU_{2}	—	October 8, 2007	Catalina	CSS	·	1.9 km	MPC · JPL
510762	2012 YL_{8}	—	December 27, 2012	Haleakala	Pan-STARRS 1	H	560 m	MPC · JPL
510763	2012 YA_{9}	—	March 4, 2010	WISE	WISE	·	2.2 km	MPC · JPL
510764	2013 AY_{4}	—	September 26, 2006	Kitt Peak	Spacewatch	·	1.4 km	MPC · JPL
510765	2013 AO_{11}	—	November 12, 2007	Mount Lemmon	Mount Lemmon Survey	H	570 m	MPC · JPL
510766	2013 AA_{23}	—	January 5, 2013	Mount Lemmon	Mount Lemmon Survey	T_{j} (2.98) · EUP	4.3 km	MPC · JPL
510767	2013 AK_{23}	—	January 5, 2013	Mount Lemmon	Mount Lemmon Survey	·	2.8 km	MPC · JPL
510768	2013 AZ_{25}	—	November 6, 2012	Kitt Peak	Spacewatch	·	1.6 km	MPC · JPL
510769	2013 AS_{32}	—	September 5, 2010	Mount Lemmon	Mount Lemmon Survey	·	2.3 km	MPC · JPL
510770	2013 AZ_{37}	—	January 5, 2013	Kitt Peak	Spacewatch	·	3.5 km	MPC · JPL
510771	2013 AA_{38}	—	October 19, 2006	Kitt Peak	Spacewatch	·	2.1 km	MPC · JPL
510772	2013 AL_{42}	—	October 24, 2011	Haleakala	Pan-STARRS 1	VER	3.4 km	MPC · JPL
510773	2013 AX_{48}	—	December 30, 2008	Mount Lemmon	Mount Lemmon Survey	·	1.6 km	MPC · JPL
510774	2013 AD_{52}	—	January 8, 2013	Haleakala	Pan-STARRS 1	H	540 m	MPC · JPL
510775	2013 AY_{56}	—	November 12, 2012	Mount Lemmon	Mount Lemmon Survey	TIR	2.3 km	MPC · JPL
510776	2013 AS_{57}	—	December 9, 2012	Mount Lemmon	Mount Lemmon Survey	·	2.3 km	MPC · JPL
510777	2013 AZ_{58}	—	October 25, 2011	Haleakala	Pan-STARRS 1	·	2.4 km	MPC · JPL
510778	2013 AM_{61}	—	September 19, 2011	Haleakala	Pan-STARRS 1	·	2.1 km	MPC · JPL
510779	2013 AK_{68}	—	January 10, 2013	Haleakala	Pan-STARRS 1	H	420 m	MPC · JPL
510780	2013 AO_{68}	—	January 11, 2013	Haleakala	Pan-STARRS 1	H	550 m	MPC · JPL
510781	2013 AJ_{70}	—	October 5, 2002	Socorro	LINEAR	·	1.8 km	MPC · JPL
510782	2013 AM_{71}	—	December 22, 2012	Haleakala	Pan-STARRS 1	·	2.2 km	MPC · JPL
510783	2013 AU_{72}	—	April 28, 2011	Haleakala	Pan-STARRS 1	H	580 m	MPC · JPL
510784	2013 AS_{83}	—	January 16, 2005	Socorro	LINEAR	H	540 m	MPC · JPL
510785	2013 AZ_{93}	—	January 9, 2013	Kitt Peak	Spacewatch	·	2.4 km	MPC · JPL
510786	2013 AT_{102}	—	December 23, 2012	Haleakala	Pan-STARRS 1	·	2.3 km	MPC · JPL
510787	2013 AB_{105}	—	August 24, 2011	Haleakala	Pan-STARRS 1	·	2.4 km	MPC · JPL
510788	2013 AL_{105}	—	December 9, 2012	Kitt Peak	Spacewatch	H	500 m	MPC · JPL
510789	2013 AB_{109}	—	October 19, 2011	Haleakala	Pan-STARRS 1	·	2.1 km	MPC · JPL
510790	2013 AQ_{110}	—	September 23, 2011	Haleakala	Pan-STARRS 1	·	1.8 km	MPC · JPL
510791	2013 AW_{120}	—	January 6, 2013	Mount Lemmon	Mount Lemmon Survey	H	450 m	MPC · JPL
510792	2013 AB_{126}	—	January 5, 2013	Catalina	CSS	H	610 m	MPC · JPL
510793	2013 AU_{132}	—	August 24, 2008	Kitt Peak	Spacewatch	L4	9.3 km	MPC · JPL
510794	2013 AW_{133}	—	January 5, 2013	Mount Lemmon	Mount Lemmon Survey	H	540 m	MPC · JPL
510795	2013 AO_{144}	—	January 30, 2008	Kitt Peak	Spacewatch	·	1.8 km	MPC · JPL
510796	2013 AH_{164}	—	February 10, 2008	Kitt Peak	Spacewatch	·	2.3 km	MPC · JPL
510797	2013 AK_{166}	—	September 26, 2011	Mount Lemmon	Mount Lemmon Survey	·	1.9 km	MPC · JPL
510798	2013 AT_{175}	—	September 20, 2011	Haleakala	Pan-STARRS 1	·	1.6 km	MPC · JPL
510799	2013 AC_{184}	—	May 29, 2011	Mount Lemmon	Mount Lemmon Survey	H	390 m	MPC · JPL
510800	2013 AE_{184}	—	July 28, 2009	Kitt Peak	Spacewatch	H	480 m	MPC · JPL

== 510801–510900 ==
back to top

Designation			Discovery			Properties		Ref
Permanent	Provisional	Named after	Date	Site	Discoverer(s)	Category	Diam.	Ref
510801	2013 BF_{3}	—	December 19, 2001	Kitt Peak	Spacewatch	·	2.7 km	MPC · JPL
510802	2013 BR_{3}	—	February 12, 2008	Mount Lemmon	Mount Lemmon Survey	·	4.0 km	MPC · JPL
510803	2013 BK_{9}	—	August 30, 2011	Haleakala	Pan-STARRS 1	·	2.0 km	MPC · JPL
510804	2013 BV_{11}	—	December 23, 2012	Haleakala	Pan-STARRS 1	·	1.7 km	MPC · JPL
510805	2013 BO_{21}	—	January 16, 2013	Haleakala	Pan-STARRS 1	TIR	3.1 km	MPC · JPL
510806	2013 BF_{25}	—	February 13, 2008	Kitt Peak	Spacewatch	·	1.3 km	MPC · JPL
510807	2013 BS_{27}	—	January 18, 2013	Haleakala	Pan-STARRS 1	H	430 m	MPC · JPL
510808	2013 BE_{29}	—	February 9, 2007	Catalina	CSS	·	4.0 km	MPC · JPL
510809	2013 BU_{29}	—	January 16, 2013	Haleakala	Pan-STARRS 1	·	2.9 km	MPC · JPL
510810	2013 BX_{29}	—	October 25, 2011	Haleakala	Pan-STARRS 1	·	2.3 km	MPC · JPL
510811	2013 BT_{30}	—	September 14, 2006	Kitt Peak	Spacewatch	·	1.3 km	MPC · JPL
510812	2013 BF_{32}	—	January 6, 2013	Kitt Peak	Spacewatch	·	3.7 km	MPC · JPL
510813	2013 BQ_{41}	—	October 25, 2011	Haleakala	Pan-STARRS 1	·	2.0 km	MPC · JPL
510814	2013 BJ_{42}	—	August 15, 2006	Palomar	NEAT	·	3.1 km	MPC · JPL
510815	2013 BK_{62}	—	October 23, 2011	Haleakala	Pan-STARRS 1	·	2.9 km	MPC · JPL
510816	2013 BM_{69}	—	October 23, 2011	Haleakala	Pan-STARRS 1	EOS	2.6 km	MPC · JPL
510817	2013 BA_{70}	—	January 10, 2008	Kitt Peak	Spacewatch	H	440 m	MPC · JPL
510818	2013 BB_{72}	—	October 17, 2006	Mount Lemmon	Mount Lemmon Survey	·	2.4 km	MPC · JPL
510819	2013 BZ_{72}	—	January 24, 2013	Haleakala	Pan-STARRS 1	H	450 m	MPC · JPL
510820	2013 BT_{73}	—	September 25, 2009	Mount Lemmon	Mount Lemmon Survey	H	410 m	MPC · JPL
510821	2013 BK_{74}	—	January 11, 2008	Kitt Peak	Spacewatch	·	1.3 km	MPC · JPL
510822	2013 BL_{75}	—	October 26, 2011	Haleakala	Pan-STARRS 1	EOS	2.5 km	MPC · JPL
510823	2013 BC_{77}	—	September 23, 2011	Haleakala	Pan-STARRS 1	·	1.9 km	MPC · JPL
510824	2013 BG_{77}	—	January 8, 2002	Kitt Peak	Spacewatch	·	2.2 km	MPC · JPL
510825	2013 CD	—	January 6, 2013	Catalina	CSS	H	490 m	MPC · JPL
510826	2013 CB_{4}	—	January 10, 2013	Haleakala	Pan-STARRS 1	·	1.7 km	MPC · JPL
510827	2013 CE_{4}	—	January 10, 2013	Kitt Peak	Spacewatch	EOS	1.7 km	MPC · JPL
510828	2013 CL_{6}	—	October 19, 2011	Mount Lemmon	Mount Lemmon Survey	·	1.7 km	MPC · JPL
510829	2013 CF_{15}	—	December 1, 2011	Haleakala	Pan-STARRS 1	·	3.0 km	MPC · JPL
510830	2013 CT_{17}	—	March 5, 2008	Mount Lemmon	Mount Lemmon Survey	·	2.2 km	MPC · JPL
510831	2013 CZ_{18}	—	February 1, 2013	Kitt Peak	Spacewatch	TIR	2.3 km	MPC · JPL
510832	2013 CZ_{20}	—	November 16, 2011	Mount Lemmon	Mount Lemmon Survey	KOR	1.2 km	MPC · JPL
510833	2013 CJ_{24}	—	February 10, 2002	Kitt Peak	Spacewatch	·	2.6 km	MPC · JPL
510834	2013 CU_{29}	—	January 18, 2013	Kitt Peak	Spacewatch	·	2.3 km	MPC · JPL
510835	2013 CF_{32}	—	January 9, 2013	Mount Lemmon	Mount Lemmon Survey	H	550 m	MPC · JPL
510836	2013 CJ_{33}	—	December 14, 2001	Kitt Peak	Spacewatch	·	2.8 km	MPC · JPL
510837	2013 CC_{34}	—	February 3, 2013	Haleakala	Pan-STARRS 1	H	550 m	MPC · JPL
510838	2013 CN_{36}	—	February 8, 2013	Haleakala	Pan-STARRS 1	H	470 m	MPC · JPL
510839	2013 CW_{36}	—	January 18, 2013	Haleakala	Pan-STARRS 1	·	2.6 km	MPC · JPL
510840	2013 CS_{40}	—	February 2, 2013	Haleakala	Pan-STARRS 1	H	530 m	MPC · JPL
510841	2013 CL_{43}	—	February 5, 2013	Kitt Peak	Spacewatch	·	2.4 km	MPC · JPL
510842	2013 CO_{44}	—	March 7, 2008	Kitt Peak	Spacewatch	·	2.3 km	MPC · JPL
510843	2013 CC_{46}	—	January 9, 2013	Kitt Peak	Spacewatch	H	460 m	MPC · JPL
510844	2013 CM_{47}	—	February 13, 2008	Mount Lemmon	Mount Lemmon Survey	·	1.7 km	MPC · JPL
510845	2013 CO_{47}	—	December 10, 2006	Kitt Peak	Spacewatch	·	2.0 km	MPC · JPL
510846	2013 CM_{53}	—	February 1, 2013	Mount Lemmon	Mount Lemmon Survey	·	2.6 km	MPC · JPL
510847	2013 CJ_{59}	—	February 2, 2013	Mount Lemmon	Mount Lemmon Survey	H	510 m	MPC · JPL
510848	2013 CF_{60}	—	January 10, 2013	Haleakala	Pan-STARRS 1	VER	2.3 km	MPC · JPL
510849	2013 CE_{61}	—	February 5, 2013	Mount Lemmon	Mount Lemmon Survey	BRA	1.5 km	MPC · JPL
510850	2013 CR_{62}	—	February 7, 2013	Kitt Peak	Spacewatch	H	430 m	MPC · JPL
510851	2013 CT_{67}	—	September 2, 2010	Kitt Peak	Spacewatch	·	2.1 km	MPC · JPL
510852	2013 CB_{70}	—	January 10, 2008	Kitt Peak	Spacewatch	·	1.5 km	MPC · JPL
510853	2013 CY_{70}	—	January 23, 2013	Mount Lemmon	Mount Lemmon Survey	TIR	2.5 km	MPC · JPL
510854	2013 CU_{73}	—	January 5, 2013	Mount Lemmon	Mount Lemmon Survey	THM	1.7 km	MPC · JPL
510855	2013 CG_{75}	—	August 15, 2009	Kitt Peak	Spacewatch	·	2.8 km	MPC · JPL
510856	2013 CM_{75}	—	November 28, 2011	Mount Lemmon	Mount Lemmon Survey	·	2.0 km	MPC · JPL
510857	2013 CO_{76}	—	January 20, 2013	Mount Lemmon	Mount Lemmon Survey	·	2.8 km	MPC · JPL
510858	2013 CY_{78}	—	December 30, 2007	Kitt Peak	Spacewatch	·	1.6 km	MPC · JPL
510859	2013 CJ_{79}	—	March 5, 2008	Kitt Peak	Spacewatch	H	500 m	MPC · JPL
510860	2013 CF_{85}	—	March 5, 2008	Kitt Peak	Spacewatch	THM	1.9 km	MPC · JPL
510861	2013 CP_{86}	—	August 1, 2011	Haleakala	Pan-STARRS 1	H	590 m	MPC · JPL
510862	2013 CD_{88}	—	January 9, 2013	Mount Lemmon	Mount Lemmon Survey	H	630 m	MPC · JPL
510863	2013 CO_{91}	—	February 8, 2013	Haleakala	Pan-STARRS 1	·	2.1 km	MPC · JPL
510864	2013 CX_{94}	—	August 29, 2005	Kitt Peak	Spacewatch	·	2.6 km	MPC · JPL
510865	2013 CJ_{97}	—	October 23, 2011	Haleakala	Pan-STARRS 1	EOS	1.8 km	MPC · JPL
510866	2013 CR_{97}	—	March 28, 2008	Mount Lemmon	Mount Lemmon Survey	THM	1.7 km	MPC · JPL
510867	2013 CB_{107}	—	September 21, 2011	Kitt Peak	Spacewatch	·	2.5 km	MPC · JPL
510868	2013 CH_{108}	—	March 8, 2008	Kitt Peak	Spacewatch	EOS	1.6 km	MPC · JPL
510869	2013 CG_{109}	—	September 19, 2011	Haleakala	Pan-STARRS 1	·	2.1 km	MPC · JPL
510870	2013 CJ_{109}	—	January 20, 2013	Kitt Peak	Spacewatch	·	2.7 km	MPC · JPL
510871	2013 CQ_{110}	—	October 23, 2011	Haleakala	Pan-STARRS 1	EOS	1.7 km	MPC · JPL
510872	2013 CK_{115}	—	January 27, 2007	Mount Lemmon	Mount Lemmon Survey	·	3.2 km	MPC · JPL
510873	2013 CD_{118}	—	August 28, 2011	Haleakala	Pan-STARRS 1	H	590 m	MPC · JPL
510874	2013 CS_{120}	—	September 20, 2011	Kitt Peak	Spacewatch	·	2.9 km	MPC · JPL
510875	2013 CF_{122}	—	March 31, 2008	Mount Lemmon	Mount Lemmon Survey	·	1.8 km	MPC · JPL
510876	2013 CK_{126}	—	October 23, 2011	Haleakala	Pan-STARRS 1	VER	3.4 km	MPC · JPL
510877	2013 CG_{127}	—	March 29, 2008	Kitt Peak	Spacewatch	HYG	2.4 km	MPC · JPL
510878	2013 CO_{128}	—	January 19, 2005	Kitt Peak	Spacewatch	H	610 m	MPC · JPL
510879	2013 CS_{128}	—	February 1, 2013	Kitt Peak	Spacewatch	H	520 m	MPC · JPL
510880	2013 CX_{130}	—	November 2, 2011	Kitt Peak	Spacewatch	·	2.4 km	MPC · JPL
510881	2013 CT_{132}	—	January 18, 2013	Haleakala	Pan-STARRS 1	H	460 m	MPC · JPL
510882	2013 CT_{135}	—	February 7, 2013	Catalina	CSS	H	380 m	MPC · JPL
510883	2013 CB_{142}	—	March 1, 2008	Kitt Peak	Spacewatch	·	2.0 km	MPC · JPL
510884	2013 CQ_{143}	—	March 8, 2008	Kitt Peak	Spacewatch	·	1.9 km	MPC · JPL
510885	2013 CY_{143}	—	March 11, 2003	Kitt Peak	Spacewatch	·	1.1 km	MPC · JPL
510886	2013 CC_{144}	—	August 17, 2009	Kitt Peak	Spacewatch	·	2.9 km	MPC · JPL
510887	2013 CQ_{147}	—	February 5, 2013	Kitt Peak	Spacewatch	·	2.1 km	MPC · JPL
510888	2013 CW_{152}	—	August 28, 2011	Siding Spring	SSS	·	2.1 km	MPC · JPL
510889	2013 CP_{158}	—	February 14, 2013	Kitt Peak	Spacewatch	·	2.6 km	MPC · JPL
510890	2013 CK_{164}	—	February 5, 2013	Kitt Peak	Spacewatch	·	1.7 km	MPC · JPL
510891	2013 CU_{170}	—	February 20, 2002	Kitt Peak	Spacewatch	·	2.4 km	MPC · JPL
510892	2013 CH_{173}	—	January 9, 2013	Mount Lemmon	Mount Lemmon Survey	ELF	3.2 km	MPC · JPL
510893	2013 CX_{174}	—	February 15, 2013	Haleakala	Pan-STARRS 1	·	2.7 km	MPC · JPL
510894	2013 CE_{178}	—	October 16, 2006	Kitt Peak	Spacewatch	·	1.6 km	MPC · JPL
510895	2013 CA_{181}	—	December 21, 2006	Kitt Peak	Spacewatch	·	2.8 km	MPC · JPL
510896	2013 CU_{189}	—	January 10, 2013	Haleakala	Pan-STARRS 1	AGN	1.2 km	MPC · JPL
510897	2013 CC_{190}	—	July 14, 2010	WISE	WISE	·	4.1 km	MPC · JPL
510898	2013 CS_{190}	—	July 2, 2010	WISE	WISE	·	3.2 km	MPC · JPL
510899	2013 CR_{191}	—	January 22, 2013	Haleakala	Pan-STARRS 1	H	410 m	MPC · JPL
510900	2013 CD_{194}	—	October 25, 2011	Haleakala	Pan-STARRS 1	·	2.3 km	MPC · JPL

== 510901–511000 ==
back to top

Designation			Discovery			Properties		Ref
Permanent	Provisional	Named after	Date	Site	Discoverer(s)	Category	Diam.	Ref
510901	2013 CD_{197}	—	March 11, 2008	Kitt Peak	Spacewatch	·	1.8 km	MPC · JPL
510902	2013 CP_{206}	—	February 8, 2002	Kitt Peak	Spacewatch	TIR	1.9 km	MPC · JPL
510903	2013 CY_{209}	—	July 1, 2011	Haleakala	Pan-STARRS 1	·	2.3 km	MPC · JPL
510904	2013 CX_{210}	—	August 24, 2008	Kitt Peak	Spacewatch	L4	10 km	MPC · JPL
510905	2013 CH_{224}	—	September 29, 2005	Mount Lemmon	Mount Lemmon Survey	·	2.0 km	MPC · JPL
510906	2013 DR	—	January 28, 2000	Kitt Peak	Spacewatch	H	540 m	MPC · JPL
510907	2013 DX_{6}	—	October 23, 2011	Haleakala	Pan-STARRS 1	·	3.7 km	MPC · JPL
510908	2013 DO_{8}	—	April 8, 2002	Kitt Peak	Spacewatch	·	2.1 km	MPC · JPL
510909	2013 DR_{8}	—	February 17, 2013	Kitt Peak	Spacewatch	THM	2.3 km	MPC · JPL
510910	2013 DS_{11}	—	December 20, 2012	Mount Lemmon	Mount Lemmon Survey	H	590 m	MPC · JPL
510911	2013 DJ_{14}	—	March 3, 1997	Kitt Peak	Spacewatch	·	3.4 km	MPC · JPL
510912	2013 EM	—	February 5, 2013	Haleakala	Pan-STARRS 1	H	550 m	MPC · JPL
510913	2013 EG_{1}	—	March 10, 2008	Mount Lemmon	Mount Lemmon Survey	EOS	1.6 km	MPC · JPL
510914	2013 EQ_{1}	—	February 13, 2008	Mount Lemmon	Mount Lemmon Survey	·	1.7 km	MPC · JPL
510915	2013 EM_{2}	—	November 18, 2007	Mount Lemmon	Mount Lemmon Survey	·	1.8 km	MPC · JPL
510916	2013 EN_{6}	—	April 30, 2008	Kitt Peak	Spacewatch	·	1.8 km	MPC · JPL
510917	2013 EC_{9}	—	January 19, 2013	Mount Lemmon	Mount Lemmon Survey	·	2.6 km	MPC · JPL
510918	2013 EP_{11}	—	March 6, 2013	Haleakala	Pan-STARRS 1	H	480 m	MPC · JPL
510919	2013 EK_{16}	—	October 26, 2011	Haleakala	Pan-STARRS 1	·	1.7 km	MPC · JPL
510920	2013 EM_{16}	—	March 3, 2013	Kitt Peak	Spacewatch	·	2.4 km	MPC · JPL
510921	2013 EJ_{18}	—	October 24, 2011	Haleakala	Pan-STARRS 1	·	1.6 km	MPC · JPL
510922	2013 EU_{24}	—	February 14, 2013	Kitt Peak	Spacewatch	·	3.7 km	MPC · JPL
510923	2013 EU_{30}	—	February 25, 2007	Mount Lemmon	Mount Lemmon Survey	·	3.0 km	MPC · JPL
510924	2013 EJ_{34}	—	October 23, 2011	Haleakala	Pan-STARRS 1	·	3.0 km	MPC · JPL
510925	2013 ED_{40}	—	January 20, 2013	Mount Lemmon	Mount Lemmon Survey	·	1.7 km	MPC · JPL
510926	2013 EL_{41}	—	February 9, 2005	Mount Lemmon	Mount Lemmon Survey	H	590 m	MPC · JPL
510927	2013 EU_{43}	—	February 2, 2013	Kitt Peak	Spacewatch	·	2.5 km	MPC · JPL
510928	2013 EW_{49}	—	March 6, 2013	Haleakala	Pan-STARRS 1	HYG	2.4 km	MPC · JPL
510929	2013 EX_{51}	—	March 2, 2013	Kitt Peak	Spacewatch	3:2 · (6124)	5.1 km	MPC · JPL
510930	2013 EK_{58}	—	September 10, 2010	Mount Lemmon	Mount Lemmon Survey	·	2.6 km	MPC · JPL
510931	2013 EZ_{62}	—	August 28, 2005	Kitt Peak	Spacewatch	TIR	2.6 km	MPC · JPL
510932	2013 EA_{67}	—	January 15, 2005	Catalina	CSS	H	550 m	MPC · JPL
510933	2013 EH_{75}	—	May 31, 2008	Kitt Peak	Spacewatch	·	2.0 km	MPC · JPL
510934	2013 EU_{90}	—	December 1, 2006	Kitt Peak	Spacewatch	·	3.1 km	MPC · JPL
510935	2013 EA_{93}	—	March 5, 2008	Kitt Peak	Spacewatch	H	500 m	MPC · JPL
510936	2013 ED_{94}	—	August 23, 2011	Haleakala	Pan-STARRS 1	H	540 m	MPC · JPL
510937	2013 EC_{97}	—	October 17, 2010	Mount Lemmon	Mount Lemmon Survey	VER	2.6 km	MPC · JPL
510938	2013 EM_{101}	—	March 3, 2008	Mount Lemmon	Mount Lemmon Survey	·	2.9 km	MPC · JPL
510939	2013 EL_{103}	—	April 6, 2008	Mount Lemmon	Mount Lemmon Survey	·	3.5 km	MPC · JPL
510940	2013 EM_{104}	—	January 15, 1996	Kitt Peak	Spacewatch	·	2.6 km	MPC · JPL
510941	2013 ES_{104}	—	August 27, 2009	Kitt Peak	Spacewatch	·	3.9 km	MPC · JPL
510942	2013 EP_{107}	—	September 2, 2011	Haleakala	Pan-STARRS 1	H	440 m	MPC · JPL
510943	2013 EO_{118}	—	March 4, 2013	Haleakala	Pan-STARRS 1	H	460 m	MPC · JPL
510944	2013 EQ_{119}	—	January 10, 2007	Kitt Peak	Spacewatch	·	2.5 km	MPC · JPL
510945	2013 EC_{122}	—	March 15, 2013	Mount Lemmon	Mount Lemmon Survey	LIX	2.8 km	MPC · JPL
510946	2013 EB_{126}	—	March 15, 2013	Mount Lemmon	Mount Lemmon Survey	·	2.3 km	MPC · JPL
510947	2013 EA_{155}	—	January 28, 2007	Mount Lemmon	Mount Lemmon Survey	THM	1.8 km	MPC · JPL
510948	2013 EF_{155}	—	March 10, 2008	Kitt Peak	Spacewatch	·	2.3 km	MPC · JPL
510949	2013 EG_{155}	—	October 1, 2005	Mount Lemmon	Mount Lemmon Survey	·	2.1 km	MPC · JPL
510950	2013 FR_{14}	—	April 12, 2002	Palomar	NEAT	·	3.4 km	MPC · JPL
510951	2013 FU_{14}	—	January 19, 2008	Mount Lemmon	Mount Lemmon Survey	·	2.7 km	MPC · JPL
510952	2013 FR_{21}	—	March 15, 2013	Kitt Peak	Spacewatch	URS	2.9 km	MPC · JPL
510953	2013 FS_{21}	—	December 8, 2005	Kitt Peak	Spacewatch	THM	2.3 km	MPC · JPL
510954	2013 FX_{21}	—	March 13, 2013	Mount Lemmon	Mount Lemmon Survey	·	2.0 km	MPC · JPL
510955	2013 FB_{29}	—	March 17, 2013	Kitt Peak	Spacewatch	·	2.4 km	MPC · JPL
510956	2013 GV_{1}	—	March 12, 2013	Kitt Peak	Spacewatch	·	2.3 km	MPC · JPL
510957	2013 GD_{21}	—	October 30, 2006	Mount Lemmon	Mount Lemmon Survey	T_{j} (2.98)	3.3 km	MPC · JPL
510958	2013 GF_{24}	—	March 5, 2013	Haleakala	Pan-STARRS 1	·	2.9 km	MPC · JPL
510959	2013 GL_{34}	—	September 24, 2005	Kitt Peak	Spacewatch	·	2.7 km	MPC · JPL
510960	2013 GW_{44}	—	October 22, 2006	Catalina	CSS	H	580 m	MPC · JPL
510961	2013 GP_{45}	—	May 15, 2008	Mount Lemmon	Mount Lemmon Survey	·	2.8 km	MPC · JPL
510962	2013 GZ_{51}	—	March 18, 2013	Kitt Peak	Spacewatch	H	530 m	MPC · JPL
510963	2013 GU_{56}	—	February 17, 2007	Kitt Peak	Spacewatch	·	2.8 km	MPC · JPL
510964	2013 GO_{67}	—	March 5, 2013	Mount Lemmon	Mount Lemmon Survey	·	2.5 km	MPC · JPL
510965	2013 GA_{68}	—	February 25, 2007	Anderson Mesa	LONEOS	LIX	3.5 km	MPC · JPL
510966	2013 GS_{68}	—	November 18, 2001	Socorro	LINEAR	H	510 m	MPC · JPL
510967	2013 GT_{68}	—	March 7, 2013	Catalina	CSS	H	500 m	MPC · JPL
510968	2013 GN_{69}	—	November 16, 2006	Kitt Peak	Spacewatch	H	390 m	MPC · JPL
510969	2013 GY_{74}	—	March 16, 2013	Kitt Peak	Spacewatch	·	2.4 km	MPC · JPL
510970	2013 GE_{98}	—	March 14, 2013	Kitt Peak	Spacewatch	·	2.4 km	MPC · JPL
510971	2013 GR_{98}	—	April 18, 2002	Kitt Peak	Spacewatch	·	2.9 km	MPC · JPL
510972	2013 GZ_{103}	—	October 26, 2011	Haleakala	Pan-STARRS 1	·	2.1 km	MPC · JPL
510973	2013 GX_{116}	—	March 19, 2013	Haleakala	Pan-STARRS 1	·	2.9 km	MPC · JPL
510974	2013 GO_{132}	—	January 17, 2007	Kitt Peak	Spacewatch	·	2.1 km	MPC · JPL
510975	2013 GM_{138}	—	April 13, 2013	Haleakala	Pan-STARRS 1	H	480 m	MPC · JPL
510976	2013 HB	—	November 11, 2006	Kitt Peak	Spacewatch	H	410 m	MPC · JPL
510977	2013 HJ	—	October 17, 2006	Catalina	CSS	H	490 m	MPC · JPL
510978	2013 HE_{5}	—	October 31, 2005	Mount Lemmon	Mount Lemmon Survey	·	3.7 km	MPC · JPL
510979	2013 HC_{7}	—	February 13, 2012	Haleakala	Pan-STARRS 1	·	4.1 km	MPC · JPL
510980	2013 HZ_{8}	—	October 26, 2011	Haleakala	Pan-STARRS 1	·	4.3 km	MPC · JPL
510981	2013 HC_{11}	—	December 21, 2006	Mount Lemmon	Mount Lemmon Survey	·	2.9 km	MPC · JPL
510982	2013 HR_{12}	—	March 11, 2013	Mount Lemmon	Mount Lemmon Survey	·	3.6 km	MPC · JPL
510983	2013 HM_{18}	—	May 11, 2005	Catalina	CSS	H	520 m	MPC · JPL
510984	2013 HC_{23}	—	March 8, 2005	Catalina	CSS	H	600 m	MPC · JPL
510985	2013 HC_{41}	—	February 23, 2007	Kitt Peak	Spacewatch	EOS	1.7 km	MPC · JPL
510986	2013 HF_{80}	—	April 20, 2007	Mount Lemmon	Mount Lemmon Survey	·	2.6 km	MPC · JPL
510987	2013 HM_{125}	—	February 17, 2007	Catalina	CSS	·	2.4 km	MPC · JPL
510988	2013 HJ_{144}	—	April 9, 2013	Haleakala	Pan-STARRS 1	·	2.5 km	MPC · JPL
510989	2013 JX_{3}	—	March 4, 2013	Haleakala	Pan-STARRS 1	·	2.3 km	MPC · JPL
510990	2013 JH_{5}	—	March 31, 2013	Mount Lemmon	Mount Lemmon Survey	·	2.9 km	MPC · JPL
510991	2013 JM_{5}	—	January 24, 2012	La Sagra	OAM	·	4.1 km	MPC · JPL
510992	2013 JX_{35}	—	May 2, 2010	WISE	WISE	H	550 m	MPC · JPL
510993	2013 JU_{40}	—	February 3, 2012	Mount Lemmon	Mount Lemmon Survey	·	3.3 km	MPC · JPL
510994	2013 JB_{57}	—	April 10, 2013	Mount Lemmon	Mount Lemmon Survey	H	400 m	MPC · JPL
510995	2013 JP_{62}	—	November 8, 2010	Mount Lemmon	Mount Lemmon Survey	·	2.6 km	MPC · JPL
510996	2013 KA_{3}	—	May 16, 2013	Haleakala	Pan-STARRS 1	·	510 m	MPC · JPL
510997	2013 KW_{17}	—	February 3, 2012	Haleakala	Pan-STARRS 1	·	3.3 km	MPC · JPL
510998	2013 LB_{15}	—	December 19, 2009	Mount Lemmon	Mount Lemmon Survey	H	470 m	MPC · JPL
510999	2013 LE_{30}	—	June 10, 2013	Kitt Peak	Spacewatch	H	560 m	MPC · JPL
511000	2013 LA_{36}	—	June 10, 2013	Kitt Peak	Spacewatch	H	490 m	MPC · JPL

back to top

== Meaning of names ==
As minor planet discoveries are confirmed, they are given a permanent number by the IAU's Minor Planet Center (MPC), and the discoverers can then submit names for them, following the IAU's naming conventions. The list below concerns those minor planets in the specified number-range that have received names, and explains the meanings of those names.

Official naming citations of newly named small Solar System bodies are approved and published in a bulletin by IAU's Working Group for Small Bodies Nomenclature (WGSBN). Before May 2021, citations were published in MPC's Minor Planet Circulars for many decades. Recent citations can also be found on the JPL Small-Body Database (SBDB). Until his death in 2016, German astronomer Lutz D. Schmadel compiled these citations into the Dictionary of Minor Planet Names (DMP) and regularly updated the collection.

Based on Paul Herget's The Names of the Minor Planets, Schmadel also researched the unclear origin of numerous asteroids, most of which had been named prior to World War II. This article incorporates text from this source, which is in the public domain: SBDB New namings may only be added to this list below after official publication as the preannouncement of names is condemned. The WGSBN publishes a comprehensive guideline for the naming rules of non-cometary small Solar System bodies.

Named minor planet	Provisional	This minor planet was named for...	Ref · Catalog
510045 Vincematteo	2010 EP_{2}	Vince Matteo (born 1941) is a participant at the Adirondack Astronomy Retreat. His all-sky photograph showing the International Space Station, a meteor, and many constellations is shown at the retreat's lodge.	JPL · 510045
510466 Varna	2011 WK_{61}	The city of Varna, Bulgaria	IAU · 510466
