= Meanings of minor-planet names: 348001–349000 =

As minor planet discoveries are confirmed, they are given a permanent number by the IAU's Minor Planet Center (MPC), and the discoverers can then submit names for them, following the IAU's naming conventions. The list below concerns those minor planets in the specified number-range that have received names, and explains the meanings of those names.

Official naming citations of newly named small Solar System bodies are approved and published in a bulletin by IAU's Working Group for Small Bodies Nomenclature (WGSBN). Before May 2021, citations were published in MPC's Minor Planet Circulars for many decades. Recent citations can also be found on the JPL Small-Body Database (SBDB). Until his death in 2016, German astronomer Lutz D. Schmadel compiled these citations into the Dictionary of Minor Planet Names (DMP) and regularly updated the collection.

Based on Paul Herget's The Names of the Minor Planets, Schmadel also researched the unclear origin of numerous asteroids, most of which had been named prior to World War II. This article incorporates text from this source, which is in the public domain: SBDB New namings may only be added to this list below after official publication as the preannouncement of names is condemned. The WGSBN publishes a comprehensive guideline for the naming rules of non-cometary small Solar System bodies.

== 348001–348100 ==
Named minor planet	Provisional	This minor planet was named for...	Ref · Catalog
348034 Deslorieux	2003 UJ_{26}	Jean-Marie Deslorieux (1871–1958), grandfather of French discoverer Jean-Claude Merlin	JPL · 348034

== 348101–348200 ==
back to top

Named minor planet	Provisional	This minor planet was named for...	Ref · Catalog
There are no named minor planets in this number range

== 348201–348300 ==
back to top

Named minor planet	Provisional	This minor planet was named for...	Ref · Catalog
348239 Societadante	2004 SB_{26}	The Dante Alighieri Society (Società Dante Alighieri), a society that promotes Italian culture and language around the world.	JPL · 348239

== 348301–348400 ==
back to top

Named minor planet	Provisional	This minor planet was named for...	Ref · Catalog
348383 Petibon	2005 GA_{33}	Patricia Petibon (born 1970), a French ligera coloratura soprano who studied song at the Conservatoire de Paris. First acclaimed for her interpretations of French Baroque music, she has mastered an eclectic repertoire ranging from baroque to modern music, including opera, operetta and oratorio.	JPL · 348383

== 348401–348500 ==
back to top

Named minor planet	Provisional	This minor planet was named for...	Ref · Catalog
348407 Patkósandrás	2005 JC_{94}	András Patkós (born 1947), a Hungarian nuclear physicist	JPL · 348407

== 348501–348600 ==
back to top

Named minor planet	Provisional	This minor planet was named for...	Ref · Catalog
348511 Žemaitė	2005 TP_{186}	Žemaitė was the pen name of the Lithuanian writer Julija Beniuševičiūtė (1845–1921), who was one of the inspirations for the Lithuanian renaissance at the beginning of the 20th century.	IAU · 348511

== 348601–348700 ==
back to top

Named minor planet	Provisional	This minor planet was named for...	Ref · Catalog
There are no named minor planets in this number range

== 348701–348800 ==
back to top

Named minor planet	Provisional	This minor planet was named for...	Ref · Catalog
There are no named minor planets in this number range

== 348801–348900 ==
back to top

Named minor planet	Provisional	This minor planet was named for...	Ref · Catalog
There are no named minor planets in this number range

== 348901–349000 ==
back to top

Named minor planet	Provisional	This minor planet was named for...	Ref · Catalog
There are no named minor planets in this number range

back to top

Preceded by 347,001–348,000	Meanings of minor-planet names List of minor planets: 348,001–349,000	Succeeded by 349,001–350,000
