= List of minor planets: 348001–349000 =

The following is a partial list of minor planets, running from minor-planet number 348001 through 349000, inclusive. The primary data for this and other partial lists is based on JPL's "Small-Body Orbital Elements" and data available from the Minor Planet Center. Critical list information is also provided by the MPC, unless otherwise specified from Lowell Observatory. A detailed description of the table's columns and additional sources are given on the main page including a complete list of every page in this series, and a statistical break-up on the dynamical classification of minor planets.

Also see the summary list of all named bodies in numerical and alphabetical order, and the corresponding naming citations for the number range of this particular list. New namings may only be added to this list after official publication, as the preannouncement of names is condemned by the Working Group for Small Bodies Nomenclature of the International Astronomical Union.

Near-Earth obj.	MBA (inner)	MBA (outer)	Centaur
Mars-crosser	MBA (middle)	Jupiter trojan	Trans-Neptunian obj.
Unclassified

== 348001–348100 ==
Designation			Discovery			Properties		Ref
Permanent	Provisional	Named after	Date	Site	Discoverer(s)	Category	Diam.	Ref
348001	2003 SY_{213}	—	September 26, 2003	Desert Eagle	W. K. Y. Yeung	·	1.3 km	MPC · JPL
348002	2003 SE_{239}	—	September 18, 2003	Kitt Peak	Spacewatch	·	1.4 km	MPC · JPL
348003	2003 SR_{246}	—	September 26, 2003	Socorro	LINEAR	·	1.2 km	MPC · JPL
348004	2003 SL_{252}	—	September 26, 2003	Socorro	LINEAR	JUN	2.0 km	MPC · JPL
348005	2003 SP_{255}	—	September 27, 2003	Kitt Peak	Spacewatch	·	950 m	MPC · JPL
348006	2003 SG_{258}	—	September 28, 2003	Kitt Peak	Spacewatch	EUN	1.4 km	MPC · JPL
348007	2003 SB_{266}	—	September 29, 2003	Socorro	LINEAR	·	1.9 km	MPC · JPL
348008	2003 SE_{266}	—	September 29, 2003	Socorro	LINEAR	·	1.8 km	MPC · JPL
348009	2003 SB_{276}	—	September 29, 2003	Kitt Peak	Spacewatch	·	1.9 km	MPC · JPL
348010	2003 SJ_{278}	—	September 21, 2003	Anderson Mesa	LONEOS	·	1.0 km	MPC · JPL
348011	2003 SX_{287}	—	September 30, 2003	Socorro	LINEAR	ADE	2.5 km	MPC · JPL
348012	2003 SL_{288}	—	September 28, 2003	Desert Eagle	W. K. Y. Yeung	·	1.5 km	MPC · JPL
348013	2003 SO_{299}	—	September 29, 2003	Socorro	LINEAR	·	1.5 km	MPC · JPL
348014	2003 SG_{304}	—	September 17, 2003	Palomar	NEAT	·	1.8 km	MPC · JPL
348015	2003 ST_{323}	—	September 16, 2003	Kitt Peak	Spacewatch	·	3.3 km	MPC · JPL
348016	2003 SV_{325}	—	September 18, 2003	Kitt Peak	Spacewatch	·	1.5 km	MPC · JPL
348017	2003 SL_{330}	—	September 26, 2003	Apache Point	SDSS	·	1.1 km	MPC · JPL
348018	2003 SF_{334}	—	September 22, 2003	Kitt Peak	Spacewatch	·	1.5 km	MPC · JPL
348019	2003 SQ_{335}	—	September 26, 2003	Apache Point	SDSS	·	1.6 km	MPC · JPL
348020	2003 SE_{339}	—	September 26, 2003	Apache Point	SDSS	·	1.4 km	MPC · JPL
348021	2003 SU_{372}	—	September 26, 2003	Apache Point	SDSS	·	1.2 km	MPC · JPL
348022	2003 SA_{392}	—	September 26, 2003	Apache Point	SDSS	·	1.7 km	MPC · JPL
348023	2003 SR_{427}	—	September 29, 2003	Kitt Peak	Spacewatch	·	1.5 km	MPC · JPL
348024	2003 TX_{5}	—	October 3, 2003	Kitt Peak	Spacewatch	·	1.9 km	MPC · JPL
348025	2003 TS_{6}	—	October 1, 2003	Anderson Mesa	LONEOS	·	2.1 km	MPC · JPL
348026	2003 TV_{16}	—	September 27, 2003	Socorro	LINEAR	·	2.4 km	MPC · JPL
348027	2003 TD_{50}	—	October 3, 2003	Haleakala	NEAT	·	2.8 km	MPC · JPL
348028	2003 UD_{4}	—	October 16, 2003	Palomar	NEAT	PHO	1.2 km	MPC · JPL
348029	2003 UG_{4}	—	October 16, 2003	Palomar	NEAT	·	2.4 km	MPC · JPL
348030	2003 UK_{16}	—	October 16, 2003	Anderson Mesa	LONEOS	·	2.1 km	MPC · JPL
348031	2003 UT_{18}	—	September 22, 2003	Anderson Mesa	LONEOS	T_{j} (2.94) · HIL	5.0 km	MPC · JPL
348032	2003 UM_{20}	—	October 21, 2003	Anderson Mesa	LONEOS	·	1.4 km	MPC · JPL
348033	2003 UO_{22}	—	October 20, 2003	Socorro	LINEAR	·	1.1 km	MPC · JPL
348034 Deslorieux	2003 UJ_{26}	Deslorieux	October 24, 2003	Le Creusot	J.-C. Merlin	JUN	1.3 km	MPC · JPL
348035	2003 UV_{28}	—	October 22, 2003	Kitt Peak	Spacewatch	·	2.5 km	MPC · JPL
348036	2003 UP_{36}	—	October 16, 2003	Palomar	NEAT	·	2.4 km	MPC · JPL
348037	2003 UV_{49}	—	October 16, 2003	Palomar	NEAT	·	3.2 km	MPC · JPL
348038	2003 UZ_{52}	—	October 18, 2003	Palomar	NEAT	·	2.3 km	MPC · JPL
348039	2003 UC_{78}	—	October 17, 2003	Anderson Mesa	LONEOS	·	3.5 km	MPC · JPL
348040	2003 UV_{83}	—	October 18, 2003	Palomar	NEAT	·	1.7 km	MPC · JPL
348041	2003 UA_{93}	—	October 20, 2003	Palomar	NEAT	·	2.0 km	MPC · JPL
348042	2003 UO_{104}	—	September 20, 2003	Palomar	NEAT	JUN	1.3 km	MPC · JPL
348043	2003 UJ_{127}	—	October 21, 2003	Kitt Peak	Spacewatch	·	2.0 km	MPC · JPL
348044	2003 UG_{138}	—	October 21, 2003	Socorro	LINEAR	·	2.2 km	MPC · JPL
348045	2003 UP_{138}	—	October 21, 2003	Socorro	LINEAR	·	1.9 km	MPC · JPL
348046	2003 UF_{144}	—	October 18, 2003	Anderson Mesa	LONEOS	·	1.6 km	MPC · JPL
348047	2003 UM_{144}	—	October 18, 2003	Kitt Peak	Spacewatch	·	1.8 km	MPC · JPL
348048	2003 UF_{149}	—	October 20, 2003	Kitt Peak	Spacewatch	EUN	1.5 km	MPC · JPL
348049	2003 UO_{155}	—	October 20, 2003	Socorro	LINEAR	·	1.8 km	MPC · JPL
348050	2003 UZ_{176}	—	October 21, 2003	Palomar	NEAT	·	4.8 km	MPC · JPL
348051	2003 UO_{184}	—	October 21, 2003	Palomar	NEAT	·	2.0 km	MPC · JPL
348052	2003 UH_{187}	—	October 22, 2003	Socorro	LINEAR	·	1.4 km	MPC · JPL
348053	2003 UA_{206}	—	October 22, 2003	Socorro	LINEAR	·	780 m	MPC · JPL
348054	2003 UD_{208}	—	October 22, 2003	Kitt Peak	Spacewatch	EUN	3.7 km	MPC · JPL
348055	2003 US_{213}	—	October 24, 2003	Socorro	LINEAR	·	3.6 km	MPC · JPL
348056	2003 UV_{228}	—	October 23, 2003	Anderson Mesa	LONEOS	JUN	1.0 km	MPC · JPL
348057	2003 UR_{235}	—	October 21, 2003	Kitt Peak	Spacewatch	HNS	1.7 km	MPC · JPL
348058	2003 UD_{236}	—	October 22, 2003	Kitt Peak	Spacewatch	·	2.6 km	MPC · JPL
348059	2003 UM_{236}	—	October 22, 2003	Haleakala	NEAT	ADE	2.4 km	MPC · JPL
348060	2003 UT_{257}	—	October 25, 2003	Socorro	LINEAR	·	2.3 km	MPC · JPL
348061	2003 UR_{272}	—	October 16, 2003	Anderson Mesa	LONEOS	·	2.2 km	MPC · JPL
348062	2003 UU_{274}	—	October 30, 2003	Haleakala	NEAT	·	3.1 km	MPC · JPL
348063	2003 UJ_{276}	—	October 29, 2003	Catalina	CSS	·	3.4 km	MPC · JPL
348064	2003 UK_{281}	—	October 28, 2003	Socorro	LINEAR	·	2.0 km	MPC · JPL
348065	2003 UT_{295}	—	October 16, 2003	Kitt Peak	Spacewatch	·	1.3 km	MPC · JPL
348066	2003 UV_{300}	—	October 17, 2003	Kitt Peak	Spacewatch	·	2.1 km	MPC · JPL
348067	2003 UX_{314}	—	October 21, 2003	Palomar	NEAT	JUN	1.4 km	MPC · JPL
348068	2003 UY_{370}	—	July 3, 2003	Kitt Peak	Spacewatch	·	1.3 km	MPC · JPL
348069	2003 UZ_{376}	—	October 22, 2003	Apache Point	SDSS	·	1.9 km	MPC · JPL
348070	2003 UA_{412}	—	October 23, 2003	Apache Point	SDSS	·	2.8 km	MPC · JPL
348071	2003 WP	—	November 16, 2003	Catalina	CSS	·	3.7 km	MPC · JPL
348072	2003 WD_{11}	—	November 18, 2003	Palomar	NEAT	EOS	2.8 km	MPC · JPL
348073	2003 WN_{22}	—	November 20, 2003	Palomar	NEAT	·	1.8 km	MPC · JPL
348074	2003 WP_{26}	—	November 22, 2003	Socorro	LINEAR	PHO	2.6 km	MPC · JPL
348075	2003 WD_{38}	—	November 19, 2003	Socorro	LINEAR	·	2.7 km	MPC · JPL
348076	2003 WU_{39}	—	November 19, 2003	Kitt Peak	Spacewatch	·	2.0 km	MPC · JPL
348077	2003 WK_{63}	—	November 19, 2003	Kitt Peak	Spacewatch	·	1.9 km	MPC · JPL
348078	2003 WL_{64}	—	November 19, 2003	Kitt Peak	Spacewatch	EUN	1.6 km	MPC · JPL
348079	2003 WH_{66}	—	November 19, 2003	Socorro	LINEAR	·	1.7 km	MPC · JPL
348080	2003 WJ_{75}	—	November 18, 2003	Kitt Peak	Spacewatch	·	1.5 km	MPC · JPL
348081	2003 WK_{80}	—	November 20, 2003	Socorro	LINEAR	·	2.2 km	MPC · JPL
348082	2003 WB_{84}	—	November 21, 2003	Palomar	NEAT	EUN	1.6 km	MPC · JPL
348083	2003 WG_{94}	—	November 19, 2003	Anderson Mesa	LONEOS	·	2.8 km	MPC · JPL
348084	2003 WO_{94}	—	October 25, 2003	Socorro	LINEAR	HOF	3.4 km	MPC · JPL
348085	2003 WF_{100}	—	November 20, 2003	Socorro	LINEAR	·	2.8 km	MPC · JPL
348086	2003 WP_{101}	—	November 21, 2003	Catalina	CSS	·	2.5 km	MPC · JPL
348087	2003 WC_{111}	—	November 20, 2003	Socorro	LINEAR	·	2.0 km	MPC · JPL
348088	2003 WY_{115}	—	November 20, 2003	Socorro	LINEAR	·	2.0 km	MPC · JPL
348089	2003 WG_{125}	—	November 20, 2003	Socorro	LINEAR	·	3.5 km	MPC · JPL
348090	2003 WX_{138}	—	November 21, 2003	Socorro	LINEAR	·	2.6 km	MPC · JPL
348091	2003 WZ_{154}	—	November 26, 2003	Kitt Peak	Spacewatch	·	2.4 km	MPC · JPL
348092	2003 WO_{158}	—	November 28, 2003	Kitt Peak	Spacewatch	·	1.6 km	MPC · JPL
348093	2003 WT_{159}	—	November 30, 2003	Kitt Peak	Spacewatch	(23255)	2.3 km	MPC · JPL
348094	2003 WT_{176}	—	November 19, 2003	Kitt Peak	Spacewatch	·	1.7 km	MPC · JPL
348095	2003 WV_{193}	—	November 24, 2003	Kitt Peak	M. W. Buie	·	1.6 km	MPC · JPL
348096	2003 XH_{18}	—	December 14, 2003	Črni Vrh	Mikuž, H.	·	2.4 km	MPC · JPL
348097	2003 XH_{19}	—	December 14, 2003	Kitt Peak	Spacewatch	·	2.5 km	MPC · JPL
348098	2003 XN_{36}	—	December 3, 2003	Socorro	LINEAR	EUN	1.5 km	MPC · JPL
348099	2003 YY_{4}	—	December 16, 2003	Catalina	CSS	·	2.5 km	MPC · JPL
348100	2003 YQ_{10}	—	December 17, 2003	Socorro	LINEAR	·	2.4 km	MPC · JPL

== 348101–348200 ==
back to top

Designation			Discovery			Properties		Ref
Permanent	Provisional	Named after	Date	Site	Discoverer(s)	Category	Diam.	Ref
348101	2003 YL_{12}	—	December 17, 2003	Socorro	LINEAR	·	2.3 km	MPC · JPL
348102	2003 YE_{28}	—	December 17, 2003	Palomar	NEAT	EUN	1.8 km	MPC · JPL
348103	2003 YN_{32}	—	December 18, 2003	Haleakala	NEAT	·	2.4 km	MPC · JPL
348104	2003 YF_{38}	—	December 19, 2003	Socorro	LINEAR	·	2.1 km	MPC · JPL
348105	2003 YK_{40}	—	December 19, 2003	Kitt Peak	Spacewatch	AST	1.9 km	MPC · JPL
348106	2003 YU_{44}	—	December 19, 2003	Kitt Peak	Spacewatch	WIT	1.3 km	MPC · JPL
348107	2003 YH_{64}	—	December 19, 2003	Socorro	LINEAR	·	1.9 km	MPC · JPL
348108	2003 YP_{68}	—	December 19, 2003	Socorro	LINEAR	·	2.2 km	MPC · JPL
348109	2003 YY_{68}	—	December 20, 2003	Socorro	LINEAR	·	2.4 km	MPC · JPL
348110	2003 YV_{112}	—	December 23, 2003	Socorro	LINEAR	·	2.0 km	MPC · JPL
348111	2003 YC_{119}	—	December 27, 2003	Socorro	LINEAR	·	1.6 km	MPC · JPL
348112	2003 YG_{128}	—	December 27, 2003	Socorro	LINEAR	·	2.3 km	MPC · JPL
348113	2003 YB_{131}	—	December 28, 2003	Socorro	LINEAR	·	2.2 km	MPC · JPL
348114	2003 YM_{138}	—	December 27, 2003	Socorro	LINEAR	·	2.9 km	MPC · JPL
348115	2003 YA_{142}	—	December 28, 2003	Socorro	LINEAR	GEF	1.4 km	MPC · JPL
348116	2003 YK_{148}	—	December 29, 2003	Catalina	CSS	·	2.0 km	MPC · JPL
348117	2003 YJ_{154}	—	December 29, 2003	Socorro	LINEAR	·	2.1 km	MPC · JPL
348118	2003 YH_{171}	—	December 18, 2003	Kitt Peak	Spacewatch	EOS	2.3 km	MPC · JPL
348119	2003 YS_{172}	—	December 18, 2003	Kitt Peak	Spacewatch	·	2.3 km	MPC · JPL
348120	2004 AY_{3}	—	January 13, 2004	Kitt Peak	Spacewatch	·	2.6 km	MPC · JPL
348121	2004 AB_{24}	—	December 19, 2003	Kitt Peak	Spacewatch	·	2.0 km	MPC · JPL
348122	2004 AD_{26}	—	January 13, 2004	Palomar	NEAT	·	2.1 km	MPC · JPL
348123	2004 BO	—	January 16, 2004	Kitt Peak	Spacewatch	·	2.0 km	MPC · JPL
348124	2004 BY_{2}	—	January 16, 2004	Palomar	NEAT	·	1.6 km	MPC · JPL
348125	2004 BQ_{13}	—	January 17, 2004	Palomar	NEAT	·	2.9 km	MPC · JPL
348126	2004 BM_{16}	—	January 16, 2004	Palomar	NEAT	·	2.3 km	MPC · JPL
348127	2004 BG_{30}	—	January 18, 2004	Palomar	NEAT	·	4.9 km	MPC · JPL
348128	2004 BN_{34}	—	January 19, 2004	Catalina	CSS	·	2.4 km	MPC · JPL
348129	2004 BZ_{39}	—	January 21, 2004	Socorro	LINEAR	·	1.9 km	MPC · JPL
348130	2004 BV_{80}	—	January 24, 2004	Socorro	LINEAR	·	2.3 km	MPC · JPL
348131	2004 BG_{89}	—	January 23, 2004	Socorro	LINEAR	·	2.7 km	MPC · JPL
348132	2004 BU_{91}	—	January 25, 2004	Haleakala	NEAT	·	2.4 km	MPC · JPL
348133	2004 BD_{97}	—	January 24, 2004	Socorro	LINEAR	·	1.9 km	MPC · JPL
348134	2004 BD_{106}	—	January 26, 2004	Anderson Mesa	LONEOS	AEO	1.4 km	MPC · JPL
348135	2004 BW_{110}	—	January 28, 2004	Kitt Peak	Spacewatch	·	3.6 km	MPC · JPL
348136	2004 BJ_{133}	—	January 17, 2004	Palomar	NEAT	·	2.6 km	MPC · JPL
348137	2004 BF_{137}	—	January 19, 2004	Kitt Peak	Spacewatch	·	1.8 km	MPC · JPL
348138	2004 BM_{142}	—	January 19, 2004	Socorro	LINEAR	·	2.2 km	MPC · JPL
348139	2004 BG_{162}	—	January 18, 2004	Palomar	NEAT	·	2.8 km	MPC · JPL
348140	2004 CH_{17}	—	February 11, 2004	Palomar	NEAT	BRA	2.3 km	MPC · JPL
348141	2004 CO_{20}	—	February 11, 2004	Kitt Peak	Spacewatch	KOR	1.5 km	MPC · JPL
348142	2004 CD_{57}	—	January 17, 2004	Palomar	NEAT	·	2.7 km	MPC · JPL
348143	2004 CF_{83}	—	February 12, 2004	Kitt Peak	Spacewatch	·	2.2 km	MPC · JPL
348144	2004 CG_{84}	—	February 12, 2004	Palomar	NEAT	·	2.4 km	MPC · JPL
348145	2004 CH_{85}	—	February 14, 2004	Haleakala	NEAT	·	1.4 km	MPC · JPL
348146	2004 CZ_{86}	—	February 11, 2004	Kitt Peak	Spacewatch	·	3.2 km	MPC · JPL
348147	2004 CW_{126}	—	February 13, 2004	Kitt Peak	Spacewatch	·	1.4 km	MPC · JPL
348148	2004 DG_{28}	—	January 19, 2004	Kitt Peak	Spacewatch	·	2.0 km	MPC · JPL
348149	2004 DH_{42}	—	February 19, 2004	Socorro	LINEAR	·	2.6 km	MPC · JPL
348150	2004 DP_{57}	—	February 23, 2004	Socorro	LINEAR	3:2	7.4 km	MPC · JPL
348151	2004 FS_{18}	—	March 26, 2004	Kitt Peak	Deep Lens Survey	·	910 m	MPC · JPL
348152	2004 FO_{128}	—	March 27, 2004	Catalina	CSS	BRA	2.2 km	MPC · JPL
348153	2004 GO_{9}	—	April 12, 2004	Kitt Peak	Spacewatch	·	950 m	MPC · JPL
348154	2004 GP_{11}	—	April 12, 2004	Socorro	LINEAR	·	4.6 km	MPC · JPL
348155	2004 GU_{16}	—	April 10, 2004	Palomar	NEAT	·	4.6 km	MPC · JPL
348156	2004 GE_{58}	—	April 14, 2004	Kitt Peak	Spacewatch	·	3.7 km	MPC · JPL
348157	2004 GR_{77}	—	April 15, 2004	Socorro	LINEAR	TIR	4.3 km	MPC · JPL
348158	2004 HT_{1}	—	April 20, 2004	Desert Eagle	W. K. Y. Yeung	·	2.2 km	MPC · JPL
348159	2004 HN_{25}	—	April 19, 2004	Socorro	LINEAR	MAS	980 m	MPC · JPL
348160	2004 HF_{37}	—	April 21, 2004	Kitt Peak	Spacewatch	·	820 m	MPC · JPL
348161	2004 HJ_{45}	—	April 21, 2004	Socorro	LINEAR	·	2.2 km	MPC · JPL
348162	2004 HN_{55}	—	April 24, 2004	Socorro	LINEAR	·	2.6 km	MPC · JPL
348163	2004 HN_{62}	—	April 24, 2004	Kitt Peak	Spacewatch	·	1.2 km	MPC · JPL
348164	2004 HY_{63}	—	April 22, 2004	Kitt Peak	Spacewatch	TIR	3.9 km	MPC · JPL
348165	2004 JX_{7}	—	May 10, 2004	Kitt Peak	Spacewatch	VER	3.1 km	MPC · JPL
348166	2004 JM_{16}	—	April 20, 2004	Socorro	LINEAR	·	4.6 km	MPC · JPL
348167	2004 JS_{29}	—	May 15, 2004	Socorro	LINEAR	·	940 m	MPC · JPL
348168	2004 JT_{29}	—	May 15, 2004	Socorro	LINEAR	·	750 m	MPC · JPL
348169	2004 JQ_{30}	—	May 15, 2004	Socorro	LINEAR	PHO	2.4 km	MPC · JPL
348170	2004 JJ_{33}	—	May 15, 2004	Socorro	LINEAR	·	910 m	MPC · JPL
348171	2004 LE_{28}	—	June 13, 2004	Catalina	CSS	·	4.9 km	MPC · JPL
348172	2004 MY_{7}	—	June 29, 2004	Wrightwood	J. W. Young	·	990 m	MPC · JPL
348173	2004 NE_{7}	—	July 11, 2004	Palomar	NEAT	LIX	5.4 km	MPC · JPL
348174	2004 NO_{7}	—	July 14, 2004	Socorro	LINEAR	·	2.6 km	MPC · JPL
348175	2004 NU_{10}	—	July 9, 2004	Siding Spring	SSS	·	1.2 km	MPC · JPL
348176	2004 NQ_{22}	—	July 11, 2004	Socorro	LINEAR	ERI	1.7 km	MPC · JPL
348177	2004 NA_{33}	—	July 13, 2004	Palomar	NEAT	·	1.2 km	MPC · JPL
348178	2004 OW_{9}	—	July 20, 2004	Reedy Creek	J. Broughton	·	1.7 km	MPC · JPL
348179	2004 OB_{13}	—	July 29, 2004	Siding Spring	SSS	PHO	990 m	MPC · JPL
348180	2004 PO_{10}	—	August 7, 2004	Campo Imperatore	CINEOS	·	1.2 km	MPC · JPL
348181	2004 PC_{29}	—	August 6, 2004	Palomar	NEAT	·	1.5 km	MPC · JPL
348182	2004 PU_{29}	—	August 7, 2004	Palomar	NEAT	·	1.4 km	MPC · JPL
348183	2004 PZ_{30}	—	August 8, 2004	Socorro	LINEAR	·	1.6 km	MPC · JPL
348184	2004 PZ_{32}	—	August 8, 2004	Socorro	LINEAR	·	2.0 km	MPC · JPL
348185	2004 PR_{46}	—	August 7, 2004	Campo Imperatore	CINEOS	·	1.5 km	MPC · JPL
348186	2004 PE_{54}	—	August 8, 2004	Anderson Mesa	LONEOS	·	1.3 km	MPC · JPL
348187	2004 PZ_{57}	—	August 9, 2004	Socorro	LINEAR	·	1.6 km	MPC · JPL
348188	2004 PT_{58}	—	August 9, 2004	Socorro	LINEAR	·	1.4 km	MPC · JPL
348189	2004 PP_{62}	—	August 10, 2004	Socorro	LINEAR	·	1.4 km	MPC · JPL
348190	2004 PS_{73}	—	August 8, 2004	Socorro	LINEAR	T_{j} (2.96)	5.1 km	MPC · JPL
348191	2004 PX_{73}	—	August 8, 2004	Socorro	LINEAR	·	1.3 km	MPC · JPL
348192	2004 PP_{88}	—	August 11, 2004	Palomar	NEAT	·	870 m	MPC · JPL
348193	2004 PE_{115}	—	August 9, 2004	Anderson Mesa	LONEOS	NYS	1.1 km	MPC · JPL
348194	2004 QG_{10}	—	August 21, 2004	Siding Spring	SSS	·	3.3 km	MPC · JPL
348195	2004 QV_{18}	—	August 21, 2004	Catalina	CSS	·	740 m	MPC · JPL
348196	2004 QA_{19}	—	August 21, 2004	Catalina	CSS	·	2.5 km	MPC · JPL
348197	2004 QP_{26}	—	August 27, 2004	Anderson Mesa	LONEOS	·	1.9 km	MPC · JPL
348198	2004 RZ_{26}	—	September 6, 2004	Palomar	NEAT	·	1.2 km	MPC · JPL
348199	2004 RC_{27}	—	September 6, 2004	Palomar	NEAT	MAS	660 m	MPC · JPL
348200	2004 RX_{31}	—	September 7, 2004	Socorro	LINEAR	·	1.4 km	MPC · JPL

== 348201–348300 ==
back to top

Designation			Discovery			Properties		Ref
Permanent	Provisional	Named after	Date	Site	Discoverer(s)	Category	Diam.	Ref
348201	2004 RZ_{31}	—	September 7, 2004	Socorro	LINEAR	·	1.4 km	MPC · JPL
348202	2004 RO_{37}	—	September 7, 2004	Socorro	LINEAR	·	1.3 km	MPC · JPL
348203	2004 RO_{38}	—	September 7, 2004	Kitt Peak	Spacewatch	MAS	860 m	MPC · JPL
348204	2004 RZ_{39}	—	September 7, 2004	Palomar	NEAT	·	3.0 km	MPC · JPL
348205	2004 RP_{42}	—	September 8, 2004	Campo Imperatore	CINEOS	(5)	1.2 km	MPC · JPL
348206	2004 RU_{42}	—	September 8, 2004	Socorro	LINEAR	·	1.8 km	MPC · JPL
348207	2004 RG_{54}	—	September 8, 2004	Socorro	LINEAR	(21344)	1.9 km	MPC · JPL
348208	2004 RL_{60}	—	September 8, 2004	Socorro	LINEAR	NYS	1.2 km	MPC · JPL
348209	2004 RY_{64}	—	July 13, 2004	Palomar	NEAT	·	3.2 km	MPC · JPL
348210	2004 RX_{65}	—	September 8, 2004	Socorro	LINEAR	MAS	800 m	MPC · JPL
348211	2004 RM_{69}	—	September 8, 2004	Socorro	LINEAR	·	1.5 km	MPC · JPL
348212	2004 RC_{75}	—	September 8, 2004	Socorro	LINEAR	·	1.9 km	MPC · JPL
348213	2004 RT_{80}	—	September 8, 2004	Socorro	LINEAR	MAS	770 m	MPC · JPL
348214	2004 RO_{82}	—	September 9, 2004	Socorro	LINEAR	MAS	840 m	MPC · JPL
348215	2004 RQ_{94}	—	September 8, 2004	Socorro	LINEAR	·	1.5 km	MPC · JPL
348216	2004 RK_{97}	—	September 8, 2004	Palomar	NEAT	GEF	2.1 km	MPC · JPL
348217	2004 RQ_{100}	—	September 8, 2004	Socorro	LINEAR	·	1.6 km	MPC · JPL
348218	2004 RT_{111}	—	September 12, 2004	Socorro	LINEAR	·	1.7 km	MPC · JPL
348219	2004 RE_{130}	—	September 7, 2004	Kitt Peak	Spacewatch	·	1.3 km	MPC · JPL
348220	2004 RT_{148}	—	September 9, 2004	Socorro	LINEAR	V	630 m	MPC · JPL
348221	2004 RU_{163}	—	September 9, 2004	Kitt Peak	Spacewatch	·	1.4 km	MPC · JPL
348222	2004 RH_{170}	—	September 8, 2004	Palomar	NEAT	·	1.6 km	MPC · JPL
348223	2004 RD_{185}	—	September 10, 2004	Socorro	LINEAR	V	950 m	MPC · JPL
348224	2004 RE_{189}	—	September 10, 2004	Socorro	LINEAR	·	1.8 km	MPC · JPL
348225	2004 RF_{193}	—	September 10, 2004	Socorro	LINEAR	·	1.7 km	MPC · JPL
348226	2004 RO_{221}	—	September 12, 2004	Socorro	LINEAR	·	2.7 km	MPC · JPL
348227	2004 RQ_{231}	—	September 9, 2004	Kitt Peak	Spacewatch	MAS	870 m	MPC · JPL
348228	2004 RY_{246}	—	September 11, 2004	Socorro	LINEAR	H	550 m	MPC · JPL
348229	2004 RS_{262}	—	September 10, 2004	Kitt Peak	Spacewatch	·	1.4 km	MPC · JPL
348230	2004 RO_{314}	—	September 15, 2004	Kitt Peak	Spacewatch	·	1.4 km	MPC · JPL
348231	2004 RT_{317}	—	September 12, 2004	Kitt Peak	Spacewatch	·	1.5 km	MPC · JPL
348232	2004 RR_{319}	—	September 13, 2004	Socorro	LINEAR	·	1.2 km	MPC · JPL
348233	2004 RU_{335}	—	September 15, 2004	Kitt Peak	Spacewatch	·	1.3 km	MPC · JPL
348234	2004 RW_{336}	—	September 15, 2004	Kitt Peak	Spacewatch	·	1.1 km	MPC · JPL
348235	2004 RR_{337}	—	September 15, 2004	Kitt Peak	Spacewatch	·	1.1 km	MPC · JPL
348236	2004 SE_{5}	—	September 18, 2004	Socorro	LINEAR	·	4.4 km	MPC · JPL
348237	2004 SW_{13}	—	September 17, 2004	Socorro	LINEAR	·	1.9 km	MPC · JPL
348238	2004 SL_{18}	—	September 17, 2004	Anderson Mesa	LONEOS	·	3.9 km	MPC · JPL
348239 Societàdante	2004 SB_{26}	Societàdante	September 20, 2004	Andrushivka	Andrushivka	EOS	2.5 km	MPC · JPL
348240	2004 SE_{31}	—	September 17, 2004	Socorro	LINEAR	·	1.3 km	MPC · JPL
348241	2004 SB_{33}	—	September 17, 2004	Socorro	LINEAR	(5)	1.5 km	MPC · JPL
348242	2004 SH_{45}	—	September 18, 2004	Socorro	LINEAR	·	1.2 km	MPC · JPL
348243	2004 SL_{50}	—	September 22, 2004	Socorro	LINEAR	·	810 m	MPC · JPL
348244	2004 SC_{51}	—	September 22, 2004	Kitt Peak	Spacewatch	·	1.4 km	MPC · JPL
348245	2004 SA_{57}	—	September 16, 2004	Anderson Mesa	LONEOS	·	1.2 km	MPC · JPL
348246	2004 TL_{2}	—	October 4, 2004	Kitt Peak	Spacewatch	MAS	930 m	MPC · JPL
348247	2004 TS_{7}	—	October 5, 2004	Haleakala	NEAT	·	3.0 km	MPC · JPL
348248	2004 TJ_{11}	—	October 8, 2004	Socorro	LINEAR	H	570 m	MPC · JPL
348249	2004 TO_{11}	—	October 5, 2004	Goodricke-Pigott	R. A. Tucker	H	760 m	MPC · JPL
348250	2004 TO_{51}	—	October 4, 2004	Kitt Peak	Spacewatch	·	1.6 km	MPC · JPL
348251	2004 TP_{71}	—	October 6, 2004	Kitt Peak	Spacewatch	·	1.4 km	MPC · JPL
348252	2004 TU_{83}	—	October 5, 2004	Kitt Peak	Spacewatch	NYS	1.1 km	MPC · JPL
348253	2004 TT_{97}	—	October 5, 2004	Kitt Peak	Spacewatch	·	1.2 km	MPC · JPL
348254	2004 TR_{102}	—	October 6, 2004	Palomar	NEAT	·	1.5 km	MPC · JPL
348255	2004 TS_{106}	—	October 7, 2004	Socorro	LINEAR	NYS	1.3 km	MPC · JPL
348256	2004 TY_{113}	—	October 7, 2004	Palomar	NEAT	·	2.4 km	MPC · JPL
348257	2004 TA_{123}	—	October 7, 2004	Goodricke-Pigott	R. A. Tucker	·	1.3 km	MPC · JPL
348258	2004 TW_{129}	—	October 7, 2004	Socorro	LINEAR	·	2.0 km	MPC · JPL
348259	2004 TF_{162}	—	October 6, 2004	Kitt Peak	Spacewatch	T_{j} (2.97) · 3:2	6.8 km	MPC · JPL
348260	2004 TL_{173}	—	October 8, 2004	Socorro	LINEAR	·	3.8 km	MPC · JPL
348261	2004 TO_{177}	—	October 6, 2004	Kitt Peak	Spacewatch	·	1.6 km	MPC · JPL
348262	2004 TS_{189}	—	October 7, 2004	Kitt Peak	Spacewatch	·	1.3 km	MPC · JPL
348263	2004 TL_{199}	—	October 7, 2004	Kitt Peak	Spacewatch	·	2.6 km	MPC · JPL
348264	2004 TT_{217}	—	October 5, 2004	Kitt Peak	Spacewatch	MAS	680 m	MPC · JPL
348265	2004 TG_{221}	—	September 14, 2004	Socorro	LINEAR	·	2.8 km	MPC · JPL
348266	2004 TV_{295}	—	October 10, 2004	Kitt Peak	Spacewatch	·	1.1 km	MPC · JPL
348267	2004 TN_{307}	—	October 10, 2004	Socorro	LINEAR	·	1.2 km	MPC · JPL
348268	2004 TZ_{322}	—	October 11, 2004	Kitt Peak	Spacewatch	·	1.1 km	MPC · JPL
348269	2004 TY_{327}	—	October 4, 2004	Palomar	NEAT	·	1.7 km	MPC · JPL
348270	2004 TS_{340}	—	October 13, 2004	Anderson Mesa	LONEOS	PHO	1.6 km	MPC · JPL
348271	2004 TZ_{345}	—	October 15, 2004	Socorro	LINEAR	·	3.6 km	MPC · JPL
348272	2004 TC_{348}	—	October 4, 2004	Kitt Peak	Spacewatch	MAS	570 m	MPC · JPL
348273	2004 VK_{6}	—	November 3, 2004	Kitt Peak	Spacewatch	·	2.1 km	MPC · JPL
348274	2004 VC_{19}	—	November 4, 2004	Catalina	CSS	·	1.9 km	MPC · JPL
348275	2004 VA_{20}	—	November 4, 2004	Catalina	CSS	·	1.6 km	MPC · JPL
348276	2004 VB_{26}	—	November 4, 2004	Catalina	CSS	·	850 m	MPC · JPL
348277	2004 VE_{38}	—	November 4, 2004	Kitt Peak	Spacewatch	·	1.4 km	MPC · JPL
348278	2004 VX_{52}	—	November 4, 2004	Catalina	CSS	·	1.3 km	MPC · JPL
348279	2004 VL_{107}	—	November 9, 2004	Mauna Kea	Veillet, C.	NYS	1.2 km	MPC · JPL
348280	2004 WA_{9}	—	November 19, 2004	Socorro	LINEAR	·	3.7 km	MPC · JPL
348281	2004 WS_{9}	—	November 22, 2004	Socorro	LINEAR	H	760 m	MPC · JPL
348282	2004 XY_{2}	—	December 2, 2004	Catalina	CSS	·	740 m	MPC · JPL
348283	2004 XS_{10}	—	December 3, 2004	Kitt Peak	Spacewatch	·	1.3 km	MPC · JPL
348284	2004 XZ_{15}	—	December 10, 2004	Kitt Peak	Spacewatch	·	2.0 km	MPC · JPL
348285	2004 XD_{16}	—	December 10, 2004	Kitt Peak	Spacewatch	·	1.6 km	MPC · JPL
348286	2004 XF_{26}	—	December 9, 2004	Kitt Peak	Spacewatch	·	2.0 km	MPC · JPL
348287	2004 XZ_{36}	—	December 11, 2004	Campo Imperatore	CINEOS	MAS	880 m	MPC · JPL
348288	2004 XQ_{41}	—	December 11, 2004	Campo Imperatore	CINEOS	(5)	1.7 km	MPC · JPL
348289	2004 XT_{70}	—	December 11, 2004	Kitt Peak	Spacewatch	T_{j} (2.95) · 3:2	6.4 km	MPC · JPL
348290	2004 XY_{85}	—	December 13, 2004	Kitt Peak	Spacewatch	·	1.9 km	MPC · JPL
348291	2004 XT_{99}	—	December 12, 2004	Kitt Peak	Spacewatch	·	1.5 km	MPC · JPL
348292	2004 XV_{105}	—	December 11, 2004	Socorro	LINEAR	·	2.1 km	MPC · JPL
348293	2004 XJ_{109}	—	December 12, 2004	Socorro	LINEAR	·	1.6 km	MPC · JPL
348294	2004 XM_{145}	—	December 8, 2004	Socorro	LINEAR	PHO	1.8 km	MPC · JPL
348295	2004 XB_{149}	—	December 14, 2004	Campo Imperatore	CINEOS	MAS	990 m	MPC · JPL
348296	2004 XK_{181}	—	December 15, 2004	Socorro	LINEAR	·	1.7 km	MPC · JPL
348297	2004 XJ_{191}	—	December 8, 2004	Socorro	LINEAR	H	740 m	MPC · JPL
348298	2004 XR_{191}	—	December 11, 2004	Catalina	CSS	·	5.9 km	MPC · JPL
348299	2004 YO_{11}	—	December 18, 2004	Mount Lemmon	Mount Lemmon Survey	·	1.5 km	MPC · JPL
348300	2004 YG_{14}	—	December 18, 2004	Mount Lemmon	Mount Lemmon Survey	·	3.0 km	MPC · JPL

== 348301–348400 ==
back to top

Designation			Discovery			Properties		Ref
Permanent	Provisional	Named after	Date	Site	Discoverer(s)	Category	Diam.	Ref
348301	2004 YM_{23}	—	December 18, 2004	Mount Lemmon	Mount Lemmon Survey	·	1.1 km	MPC · JPL
348302	2004 YY_{25}	—	December 19, 2004	Mount Lemmon	Mount Lemmon Survey	(5)	1.3 km	MPC · JPL
348303	2005 AB_{2}	—	January 1, 2005	Catalina	CSS	DOR	3.9 km	MPC · JPL
348304	2005 AN_{19}	—	January 8, 2005	Socorro	LINEAR	AMO +1km	960 m	MPC · JPL
348305	2005 AV_{28}	—	January 15, 2005	Socorro	LINEAR	·	3.4 km	MPC · JPL
348306	2005 AY_{28}	—	January 15, 2005	Socorro	LINEAR	ATE · PHA	180 m	MPC · JPL
348307	2005 AX_{31}	—	January 11, 2005	Socorro	LINEAR	(5)	1.5 km	MPC · JPL
348308	2005 AB_{34}	—	January 13, 2005	Kitt Peak	Spacewatch	·	1.2 km	MPC · JPL
348309	2005 AQ_{41}	—	January 15, 2005	Socorro	LINEAR	·	1.9 km	MPC · JPL
348310	2005 AX_{43}	—	January 15, 2005	Catalina	CSS	·	1.9 km	MPC · JPL
348311	2005 AX_{59}	—	January 15, 2005	Socorro	LINEAR	·	2.3 km	MPC · JPL
348312	2005 AR_{72}	—	January 15, 2005	Kitt Peak	Spacewatch	L5	15 km	MPC · JPL
348313	2005 AB_{73}	—	January 15, 2005	Kitt Peak	Spacewatch	·	1.9 km	MPC · JPL
348314	2005 BC	—	January 16, 2005	Catalina	CSS	APO +1km · PHA	890 m	MPC · JPL
348315	2005 BA_{7}	—	January 16, 2005	Socorro	LINEAR	·	1.5 km	MPC · JPL
348316	2005 BJ_{12}	—	January 17, 2005	Kitt Peak	Spacewatch	·	1.4 km	MPC · JPL
348317	2005 BB_{18}	—	January 16, 2005	Socorro	LINEAR	·	4.1 km	MPC · JPL
348318	2005 BH_{19}	—	January 16, 2005	Socorro	LINEAR	·	1.4 km	MPC · JPL
348319	2005 CH_{2}	—	February 1, 2005	Catalina	CSS	EUN	1.5 km	MPC · JPL
348320	2005 CU_{10}	—	February 1, 2005	Kitt Peak	Spacewatch	·	970 m	MPC · JPL
348321	2005 CM_{11}	—	February 1, 2005	Kitt Peak	Spacewatch	·	2.0 km	MPC · JPL
348322	2005 CS_{13}	—	February 2, 2005	Kitt Peak	Spacewatch	(5)	2.0 km	MPC · JPL
348323	2005 CN_{28}	—	February 1, 2005	Kitt Peak	Spacewatch	·	1.5 km	MPC · JPL
348324	2005 CY_{39}	—	February 4, 2005	Kitt Peak	Spacewatch	·	1.6 km	MPC · JPL
348325	2005 CU_{42}	—	February 2, 2005	Socorro	LINEAR	KON	3.7 km	MPC · JPL
348326	2005 CW_{48}	—	February 2, 2005	Socorro	LINEAR	·	1.5 km	MPC · JPL
348327	2005 CC_{60}	—	February 3, 2005	Socorro	LINEAR	·	2.2 km	MPC · JPL
348328	2005 CR_{60}	—	February 4, 2005	Mount Lemmon	Mount Lemmon Survey	·	1.7 km	MPC · JPL
348329	2005 CF_{66}	—	February 9, 2005	Socorro	LINEAR	(5)	1.1 km	MPC · JPL
348330	2005 CG_{79}	—	February 1, 2005	Kitt Peak	Spacewatch	WIT	1.2 km	MPC · JPL
348331	2005 EO_{5}	—	March 1, 2005	Kitt Peak	Spacewatch	·	1.1 km	MPC · JPL
348332	2005 EJ_{29}	—	March 3, 2005	Socorro	LINEAR	·	1.7 km	MPC · JPL
348333	2005 EP_{32}	—	March 3, 2005	Catalina	CSS	·	2.7 km	MPC · JPL
348334	2005 EL_{33}	—	March 4, 2005	Socorro	LINEAR	H	820 m	MPC · JPL
348335	2005 EK_{36}	—	March 4, 2005	Catalina	CSS	·	2.1 km	MPC · JPL
348336	2005 ED_{38}	—	March 4, 2005	Catalina	CSS	·	2.4 km	MPC · JPL
348337	2005 EP_{40}	—	March 1, 2005	Kitt Peak	Spacewatch	·	1.9 km	MPC · JPL
348338	2005 EK_{45}	—	March 3, 2005	Catalina	CSS	·	2.0 km	MPC · JPL
348339	2005 EG_{48}	—	March 3, 2005	Catalina	CSS	MAR	1.3 km	MPC · JPL
348340	2005 EQ_{48}	—	March 3, 2005	Catalina	CSS	·	1.4 km	MPC · JPL
348341	2005 EO_{51}	—	March 3, 2005	Catalina	CSS	·	2.1 km	MPC · JPL
348342	2005 ET_{61}	—	March 4, 2005	Mount Lemmon	Mount Lemmon Survey	·	1.8 km	MPC · JPL
348343	2005 EG_{69}	—	March 7, 2005	Socorro	LINEAR	EUN	1.4 km	MPC · JPL
348344	2005 EE_{79}	—	March 3, 2005	Catalina	CSS	·	1.9 km	MPC · JPL
348345	2005 EM_{84}	—	March 4, 2005	Socorro	LINEAR	·	1.7 km	MPC · JPL
348346	2005 EB_{94}	—	March 6, 2005	Ottmarsheim	Ottmarsheim	EUN	1.8 km	MPC · JPL
348347	2005 EV_{98}	—	March 3, 2005	Catalina	CSS	·	930 m	MPC · JPL
348348	2005 EJ_{99}	—	March 3, 2005	Catalina	CSS	·	1.7 km	MPC · JPL
348349	2005 EQ_{102}	—	March 4, 2005	Kitt Peak	Spacewatch	H	750 m	MPC · JPL
348350	2005 EO_{112}	—	March 4, 2005	Socorro	LINEAR	JUN	1.0 km	MPC · JPL
348351	2005 ER_{113}	—	March 4, 2005	Catalina	CSS	·	2.2 km	MPC · JPL
348352	2005 EV_{133}	—	March 9, 2005	Socorro	LINEAR	(5)	1.1 km	MPC · JPL
348353	2005 EM_{153}	—	March 8, 2005	Catalina	CSS	·	2.3 km	MPC · JPL
348354	2005 EU_{155}	—	March 8, 2005	Mount Lemmon	Mount Lemmon Survey	·	2.0 km	MPC · JPL
348355	2005 EO_{157}	—	March 9, 2005	Mount Lemmon	Mount Lemmon Survey	·	1.5 km	MPC · JPL
348356	2005 EF_{165}	—	March 11, 2005	Kitt Peak	Spacewatch	·	2.2 km	MPC · JPL
348357	2005 ET_{170}	—	March 7, 2005	Socorro	LINEAR	·	2.8 km	MPC · JPL
348358	2005 EE_{180}	—	March 9, 2005	Kitt Peak	Spacewatch	·	2.0 km	MPC · JPL
348359	2005 EF_{198}	—	March 11, 2005	Mount Lemmon	Mount Lemmon Survey	EUN	1.3 km	MPC · JPL
348360	2005 EP_{202}	—	March 10, 2005	Mount Lemmon	Mount Lemmon Survey	·	1.4 km	MPC · JPL
348361	2005 EW_{218}	—	March 10, 2005	Anderson Mesa	LONEOS	·	2.2 km	MPC · JPL
348362	2005 EQ_{243}	—	March 11, 2005	Anderson Mesa	LONEOS	(1547)	1.9 km	MPC · JPL
348363	2005 EZ_{243}	—	March 11, 2005	Anderson Mesa	LONEOS	·	1.7 km	MPC · JPL
348364	2005 EV_{245}	—	March 12, 2005	Kitt Peak	Spacewatch	·	1.3 km	MPC · JPL
348365	2005 EJ_{259}	—	March 11, 2005	Mount Lemmon	Mount Lemmon Survey	·	2.4 km	MPC · JPL
348366	2005 ER_{259}	—	March 11, 2005	Mount Lemmon	Mount Lemmon Survey	GEF	1.5 km	MPC · JPL
348367	2005 EN_{260}	—	March 11, 2005	Kitt Peak	Spacewatch	·	2.1 km	MPC · JPL
348368	2005 EO_{264}	—	March 13, 2005	Kitt Peak	Spacewatch	·	1.1 km	MPC · JPL
348369	2005 EJ_{276}	—	March 8, 2005	Mount Lemmon	Mount Lemmon Survey	·	1.1 km	MPC · JPL
348370	2005 EN_{279}	—	March 10, 2005	Catalina	CSS	·	2.6 km	MPC · JPL
348371	2005 EC_{280}	—	March 10, 2005	Catalina	CSS	ADE	2.2 km	MPC · JPL
348372	2005 EB_{286}	—	March 1, 2005	Catalina	CSS	·	2.7 km	MPC · JPL
348373	2005 EO_{288}	—	March 8, 2005	Socorro	LINEAR	EUN	1.4 km	MPC · JPL
348374	2005 EP_{288}	—	March 8, 2005	Socorro	LINEAR	·	2.0 km	MPC · JPL
348375	2005 EG_{295}	—	March 12, 2005	Kitt Peak	Spacewatch	·	2.4 km	MPC · JPL
348376	2005 GZ_{1}	—	April 1, 2005	Catalina	CSS	MAR	1.7 km	MPC · JPL
348377	2005 GA_{2}	—	April 1, 2005	Catalina	CSS	·	2.1 km	MPC · JPL
348378	2005 GE_{7}	—	April 1, 2005	Kitt Peak	Spacewatch	·	2.4 km	MPC · JPL
348379	2005 GP_{7}	—	April 1, 2005	Anderson Mesa	LONEOS	·	1.9 km	MPC · JPL
348380	2005 GH_{13}	—	April 1, 2005	Anderson Mesa	LONEOS	·	2.9 km	MPC · JPL
348381	2005 GJ_{17}	—	April 2, 2005	Mount Lemmon	Mount Lemmon Survey	·	1.9 km	MPC · JPL
348382	2005 GR_{17}	—	April 2, 2005	Mount Lemmon	Mount Lemmon Survey	WIT	940 m	MPC · JPL
348383 Petibon	2005 GA_{33}	Petibon	April 2, 2005	Nogales	J.-C. Merlin	MAS	730 m	MPC · JPL
348384	2005 GH_{38}	—	April 3, 2005	Palomar	NEAT	·	2.2 km	MPC · JPL
348385	2005 GJ_{55}	—	April 5, 2005	Mount Lemmon	Mount Lemmon Survey	·	2.1 km	MPC · JPL
348386	2005 GQ_{68}	—	April 2, 2005	Catalina	CSS	BRA	1.9 km	MPC · JPL
348387	2005 GR_{78}	—	April 6, 2005	Catalina	CSS	·	3.2 km	MPC · JPL
348388	2005 GA_{81}	—	April 7, 2005	Kitt Peak	Spacewatch	·	1.9 km	MPC · JPL
348389	2005 GW_{99}	—	April 7, 2005	Siding Spring	SSS	ADE	3.0 km	MPC · JPL
348390	2005 GY_{106}	—	March 10, 2005	Mount Lemmon	Mount Lemmon Survey	·	710 m	MPC · JPL
348391	2005 GU_{115}	—	April 11, 2005	Kitt Peak	Spacewatch	AGN	1.2 km	MPC · JPL
348392	2005 GS_{127}	—	April 10, 2005	Catalina	CSS	PHO	2.8 km	MPC · JPL
348393	2005 GB_{128}	—	April 9, 2005	Socorro	LINEAR	·	3.0 km	MPC · JPL
348394	2005 GH_{180}	—	April 9, 2005	Catalina	CSS	·	2.3 km	MPC · JPL
348395	2005 GG_{181}	—	April 12, 2005	Kitt Peak	Spacewatch	·	1.4 km	MPC · JPL
348396	2005 HA_{3}	—	April 17, 2005	Junk Bond	Junk Bond	·	2.3 km	MPC · JPL
348397	2005 HT_{5}	—	April 30, 2005	Kitt Peak	Spacewatch	·	960 m	MPC · JPL
348398	2005 HK_{9}	—	April 30, 2005	Kitt Peak	Spacewatch	·	2.9 km	MPC · JPL
348399	2005 JS_{2}	—	May 3, 2005	Kitt Peak	Spacewatch	·	2.6 km	MPC · JPL
348400	2005 JF_{21}	—	May 4, 2005	Kitt Peak	Spacewatch	AMO +1km · PHA · moon	1.3 km	MPC · JPL

== 348401–348500 ==
back to top

Designation			Discovery			Properties		Ref
Permanent	Provisional	Named after	Date	Site	Discoverer(s)	Category	Diam.	Ref
348401	2005 JD_{25}	—	May 3, 2005	Kitt Peak	Spacewatch	(18466)	2.7 km	MPC · JPL
348402	2005 JP_{34}	—	May 4, 2005	Kitt Peak	Spacewatch	L4	10 km	MPC · JPL
348403	2005 JY_{41}	—	May 8, 2005	Kitt Peak	Spacewatch	·	1.9 km	MPC · JPL
348404	2005 JB_{44}	—	May 4, 2005	Mount Lemmon	Mount Lemmon Survey	BAR	1.4 km	MPC · JPL
348405	2005 JT_{59}	—	May 8, 2005	Kitt Peak	Spacewatch	·	2.5 km	MPC · JPL
348406	2005 JA_{93}	—	May 11, 2005	Palomar	NEAT	EUN	2.0 km	MPC · JPL
348407 Patkósandrás	2005 JC_{94}	Patkósandrás	May 12, 2005	Piszkéstető	K. Sárneczky	H	520 m	MPC · JPL
348408	2005 JH_{98}	—	May 8, 2005	Kitt Peak	Spacewatch	AGN	1.4 km	MPC · JPL
348409	2005 JQ_{117}	—	May 10, 2005	Kitt Peak	Spacewatch	·	3.0 km	MPC · JPL
348410	2005 JU_{128}	—	May 13, 2005	Kitt Peak	Spacewatch	·	2.0 km	MPC · JPL
348411	2005 JO_{174}	—	May 11, 2005	Cerro Tololo	M. W. Buie	·	1.7 km	MPC · JPL
348412	2005 KR_{9}	—	May 30, 2005	Mayhill	Lowe, A.	·	1.3 km	MPC · JPL
348413	2005 MW_{36}	—	June 30, 2005	Kitt Peak	Spacewatch	·	680 m	MPC · JPL
348414	2005 MY_{40}	—	June 30, 2005	Palomar	NEAT	·	2.5 km	MPC · JPL
348415	2005 MG_{45}	—	June 27, 2005	Kitt Peak	Spacewatch	·	2.6 km	MPC · JPL
348416	2005 MX_{54}	—	June 20, 2005	Palomar	NEAT	TIR	3.8 km	MPC · JPL
348417	2005 NW_{8}	—	July 1, 2005	Kitt Peak	Spacewatch	·	3.8 km	MPC · JPL
348418	2005 NM_{27}	—	July 5, 2005	Mount Lemmon	Mount Lemmon Survey	·	2.9 km	MPC · JPL
348419	2005 NZ_{55}	—	July 10, 2005	Kitt Peak	Spacewatch	EOS	2.0 km	MPC · JPL
348420	2005 NT_{57}	—	July 5, 2005	Mount Lemmon	Mount Lemmon Survey	·	3.4 km	MPC · JPL
348421	2005 NB_{65}	—	July 1, 2005	Kitt Peak	Spacewatch	·	750 m	MPC · JPL
348422	2005 ND_{66}	—	June 17, 2005	Mount Lemmon	Mount Lemmon Survey	·	2.1 km	MPC · JPL
348423	2005 NG_{78}	—	July 11, 2005	Kitt Peak	Spacewatch	·	3.4 km	MPC · JPL
348424	2005 NV_{89}	—	July 4, 2005	Kitt Peak	Spacewatch	·	740 m	MPC · JPL
348425	2005 NH_{125}	—	July 4, 2005	Palomar	NEAT	·	5.2 km	MPC · JPL
348426	2005 OY_{6}	—	July 28, 2005	Palomar	NEAT	·	1.1 km	MPC · JPL
348427	2005 OH_{9}	—	July 27, 2005	Palomar	NEAT	·	1.2 km	MPC · JPL
348428	2005 OK_{18}	—	July 30, 2005	Palomar	NEAT	·	1.4 km	MPC · JPL
348429	2005 OP_{20}	—	July 28, 2005	Palomar	NEAT	·	5.6 km	MPC · JPL
348430	2005 QV_{5}	—	August 24, 2005	Palomar	NEAT	·	1.7 km	MPC · JPL
348431	2005 QL_{7}	—	August 24, 2005	Palomar	NEAT	·	1.0 km	MPC · JPL
348432	2005 QR_{12}	—	August 24, 2005	Palomar	NEAT	·	700 m	MPC · JPL
348433	2005 QV_{17}	—	August 25, 2005	Palomar	NEAT	·	820 m	MPC · JPL
348434	2005 QB_{19}	—	August 25, 2005	Campo Imperatore	CINEOS	EOS	2.7 km	MPC · JPL
348435	2005 QM_{35}	—	August 25, 2005	Palomar	NEAT	·	680 m	MPC · JPL
348436	2005 QE_{54}	—	August 28, 2005	Kitt Peak	Spacewatch	·	6.1 km	MPC · JPL
348437	2005 QO_{60}	—	August 26, 2005	Anderson Mesa	LONEOS	·	630 m	MPC · JPL
348438	2005 QT_{61}	—	August 26, 2005	Palomar	NEAT	·	2.1 km	MPC · JPL
348439	2005 QL_{74}	—	August 29, 2005	Anderson Mesa	LONEOS	MAS	860 m	MPC · JPL
348440	2005 QV_{74}	—	August 29, 2005	Anderson Mesa	LONEOS	·	980 m	MPC · JPL
348441	2005 QO_{80}	—	July 30, 2005	Palomar	NEAT	·	740 m	MPC · JPL
348442	2005 QY_{88}	—	August 30, 2005	Socorro	LINEAR	·	690 m	MPC · JPL
348443	2005 QL_{110}	—	August 27, 2005	Palomar	NEAT	·	640 m	MPC · JPL
348444	2005 QU_{111}	—	August 31, 2005	Kitt Peak	Spacewatch	·	2.3 km	MPC · JPL
348445	2005 QU_{132}	—	August 28, 2005	Kitt Peak	Spacewatch	·	1.7 km	MPC · JPL
348446	2005 QT_{150}	—	August 30, 2005	Kitt Peak	Spacewatch	·	650 m	MPC · JPL
348447	2005 QJ_{154}	—	August 27, 2005	Palomar	NEAT	·	920 m	MPC · JPL
348448	2005 QY_{159}	—	August 28, 2005	Anderson Mesa	LONEOS	·	1.9 km	MPC · JPL
348449	2005 QU_{173}	—	August 31, 2005	Anderson Mesa	LONEOS	·	1.1 km	MPC · JPL
348450	2005 QB_{183}	—	August 29, 2005	Palomar	NEAT	·	780 m	MPC · JPL
348451	2005 RU_{9}	—	September 9, 2005	Socorro	LINEAR	·	2.9 km	MPC · JPL
348452	2005 RU_{20}	—	September 1, 2005	Palomar	NEAT	H	570 m	MPC · JPL
348453	2005 RN_{24}	—	September 11, 2005	Anderson Mesa	LONEOS	·	4.3 km	MPC · JPL
348454	2005 RL_{25}	—	September 10, 2005	Anderson Mesa	LONEOS	·	2.6 km	MPC · JPL
348455	2005 RG_{34}	—	September 15, 2005	Socorro	LINEAR	·	6.6 km	MPC · JPL
348456	2005 RF_{46}	—	September 14, 2005	Apache Point	A. C. Becker	·	4.7 km	MPC · JPL
348457	2005 ST_{6}	—	August 30, 2005	Palomar	NEAT	·	1.9 km	MPC · JPL
348458	2005 SX_{13}	—	September 24, 2005	Kitt Peak	Spacewatch	HYG	3.3 km	MPC · JPL
348459	2005 SS_{14}	—	June 18, 2005	Mount Lemmon	Mount Lemmon Survey	·	910 m	MPC · JPL
348460	2005 SK_{15}	—	September 26, 2005	Kitt Peak	Spacewatch	·	700 m	MPC · JPL
348461	2005 SH_{19}	—	September 26, 2005	Kitt Peak	Spacewatch	T_{j} (2.75) · APO +1km	1.4 km	MPC · JPL
348462	2005 SH_{20}	—	September 23, 2005	Kitt Peak	Spacewatch	·	960 m	MPC · JPL
348463	2005 SY_{24}	—	September 24, 2005	Anderson Mesa	LONEOS	·	1.0 km	MPC · JPL
348464	2005 SB_{36}	—	September 23, 2005	Kitt Peak	Spacewatch	·	710 m	MPC · JPL
348465	2005 SF_{57}	—	September 26, 2005	Kitt Peak	Spacewatch	·	650 m	MPC · JPL
348466	2005 SQ_{64}	—	September 26, 2005	Kitt Peak	Spacewatch	·	1.1 km	MPC · JPL
348467	2005 SY_{67}	—	September 27, 2005	Kitt Peak	Spacewatch	·	2.9 km	MPC · JPL
348468	2005 SA_{70}	—	September 23, 2005	Kitt Peak	Spacewatch	·	1.0 km	MPC · JPL
348469	2005 SP_{70}	—	September 28, 2005	Palomar	NEAT	·	3.2 km	MPC · JPL
348470	2005 SJ_{83}	—	September 24, 2005	Kitt Peak	Spacewatch	·	4.5 km	MPC · JPL
348471	2005 SV_{90}	—	August 30, 2005	Palomar	NEAT	V	660 m	MPC · JPL
348472	2005 SN_{92}	—	September 24, 2005	Kitt Peak	Spacewatch	·	820 m	MPC · JPL
348473	2005 SV_{96}	—	August 31, 2005	Kitt Peak	Spacewatch	·	820 m	MPC · JPL
348474	2005 SF_{104}	—	September 25, 2005	Kitt Peak	Spacewatch	·	810 m	MPC · JPL
348475	2005 SX_{112}	—	September 26, 2005	Palomar	NEAT	·	2.9 km	MPC · JPL
348476	2005 SC_{120}	—	September 29, 2005	Kitt Peak	Spacewatch	·	750 m	MPC · JPL
348477	2005 SX_{124}	—	August 31, 2005	Anderson Mesa	LONEOS	·	1.1 km	MPC · JPL
348478	2005 SN_{128}	—	September 29, 2005	Anderson Mesa	LONEOS	·	780 m	MPC · JPL
348479	2005 SH_{153}	—	September 25, 2005	Kitt Peak	Spacewatch	·	910 m	MPC · JPL
348480	2005 SN_{159}	—	September 26, 2005	Palomar	NEAT	·	770 m	MPC · JPL
348481	2005 SR_{163}	—	September 27, 2005	Palomar	NEAT	·	1.0 km	MPC · JPL
348482	2005 SR_{175}	—	September 29, 2005	Kitt Peak	Spacewatch	·	890 m	MPC · JPL
348483	2005 ST_{182}	—	September 29, 2005	Kitt Peak	Spacewatch	V	700 m	MPC · JPL
348484	2005 SM_{192}	—	September 29, 2005	Mount Lemmon	Mount Lemmon Survey	EOS	2.1 km	MPC · JPL
348485	2005 SB_{194}	—	September 29, 2005	Kitt Peak	Spacewatch	·	760 m	MPC · JPL
348486	2005 SY_{195}	—	September 30, 2005	Kitt Peak	Spacewatch	·	1.1 km	MPC · JPL
348487	2005 SP_{207}	—	September 30, 2005	Kitt Peak	Spacewatch	·	1.2 km	MPC · JPL
348488	2005 SZ_{218}	—	September 30, 2005	Mount Lemmon	Mount Lemmon Survey	·	680 m	MPC · JPL
348489	2005 SC_{219}	—	September 30, 2005	Mount Lemmon	Mount Lemmon Survey	·	2.1 km	MPC · JPL
348490	2005 SB_{221}	—	September 29, 2005	Catalina	CSS	·	2.1 km	MPC · JPL
348491	2005 SN_{230}	—	September 30, 2005	Mount Lemmon	Mount Lemmon Survey	·	690 m	MPC · JPL
348492	2005 SS_{238}	—	September 30, 2005	Kitt Peak	Spacewatch	·	860 m	MPC · JPL
348493	2005 ST_{247}	—	September 30, 2005	Kitt Peak	Spacewatch	·	810 m	MPC · JPL
348494	2005 SV_{278}	—	September 23, 2005	Catalina	CSS	·	680 m	MPC · JPL
348495	2005 SJ_{281}	—	September 30, 2005	Mount Lemmon	Mount Lemmon Survey	·	800 m	MPC · JPL
348496	2005 SG_{287}	—	September 26, 2005	Apache Point	A. C. Becker	·	840 m	MPC · JPL
348497	2005 TA_{5}	—	October 1, 2005	Catalina	CSS	·	840 m	MPC · JPL
348498	2005 TJ_{5}	—	October 1, 2005	Catalina	CSS	·	830 m	MPC · JPL
348499	2005 TK_{9}	—	October 1, 2005	Kitt Peak	Spacewatch	·	580 m	MPC · JPL
348500	2005 TE_{52}	—	October 5, 2005	Catalina	CSS	·	2.1 km	MPC · JPL

== 348501–348600 ==
back to top

Designation			Discovery			Properties		Ref
Permanent	Provisional	Named after	Date	Site	Discoverer(s)	Category	Diam.	Ref
348501	2005 TC_{77}	—	October 5, 2005	Kitt Peak	Spacewatch	·	740 m	MPC · JPL
348502	2005 TA_{79}	—	October 7, 2005	Kitt Peak	Spacewatch	·	490 m	MPC · JPL
348503	2005 TC_{85}	—	October 3, 2005	Kitt Peak	Spacewatch	·	770 m	MPC · JPL
348504	2005 TB_{104}	—	September 30, 2005	Catalina	CSS	(2076)	1.1 km	MPC · JPL
348505	2005 TE_{106}	—	October 9, 2005	Kitt Peak	Spacewatch	·	1.1 km	MPC · JPL
348506	2005 TW_{135}	—	October 6, 2005	Mount Lemmon	Mount Lemmon Survey	·	3.6 km	MPC · JPL
348507	2005 TM_{142}	—	October 8, 2005	Kitt Peak	Spacewatch	·	800 m	MPC · JPL
348508	2005 TH_{153}	—	September 30, 2005	Catalina	CSS	·	3.2 km	MPC · JPL
348509	2005 TZ_{165}	—	October 9, 2005	Kitt Peak	Spacewatch	·	660 m	MPC · JPL
348510	2005 TM_{172}	—	September 10, 2005	Anderson Mesa	LONEOS	·	3.4 km	MPC · JPL
348511 Žemaitė	2005 TP_{186}	Žemaitė	October 10, 2005	Moletai	K. Černis, J. Zdanavičius	·	1.7 km	MPC · JPL
348512	2005 TT_{196}	—	October 1, 2005	Anderson Mesa	LONEOS	·	1.1 km	MPC · JPL
348513	2005 UT_{5}	—	October 27, 2005	Socorro	LINEAR	·	3.6 km	MPC · JPL
348514	2005 UX_{10}	—	October 22, 2005	Kitt Peak	Spacewatch	·	900 m	MPC · JPL
348515	2005 UU_{16}	—	October 22, 2005	Kitt Peak	Spacewatch	·	3.2 km	MPC · JPL
348516	2005 UT_{37}	—	October 24, 2005	Kitt Peak	Spacewatch	·	2.5 km	MPC · JPL
348517	2005 UK_{38}	—	October 24, 2005	Kitt Peak	Spacewatch	·	2.3 km	MPC · JPL
348518	2005 UD_{46}	—	October 22, 2005	Kitt Peak	Spacewatch	·	1.9 km	MPC · JPL
348519	2005 UK_{53}	—	October 23, 2005	Catalina	CSS	slow	3.5 km	MPC · JPL
348520	2005 UQ_{56}	—	October 24, 2005	Anderson Mesa	LONEOS	·	820 m	MPC · JPL
348521	2005 UF_{57}	—	October 24, 2005	Anderson Mesa	LONEOS	·	3.6 km	MPC · JPL
348522	2005 UF_{59}	—	October 24, 2005	Kitt Peak	Spacewatch	·	810 m	MPC · JPL
348523	2005 UO_{66}	—	October 22, 2005	Kitt Peak	Spacewatch	·	3.3 km	MPC · JPL
348524	2005 US_{69}	—	October 23, 2005	Catalina	CSS	·	750 m	MPC · JPL
348525	2005 UO_{70}	—	October 23, 2005	Catalina	CSS	·	6.1 km	MPC · JPL
348526	2005 UC_{76}	—	October 24, 2005	Palomar	NEAT	·	5.5 km	MPC · JPL
348527	2005 UJ_{82}	—	October 22, 2005	Kitt Peak	Spacewatch	THM	2.5 km	MPC · JPL
348528	2005 UY_{83}	—	October 22, 2005	Kitt Peak	Spacewatch	·	2.5 km	MPC · JPL
348529	2005 UB_{102}	—	October 22, 2005	Kitt Peak	Spacewatch	·	740 m	MPC · JPL
348530	2005 UJ_{110}	—	October 22, 2005	Kitt Peak	Spacewatch	·	1.1 km	MPC · JPL
348531	2005 UF_{124}	—	October 24, 2005	Kitt Peak	Spacewatch	·	700 m	MPC · JPL
348532	2005 UM_{131}	—	October 24, 2005	Palomar	NEAT	·	1.3 km	MPC · JPL
348533	2005 UC_{141}	—	October 25, 2005	Catalina	CSS	·	1.2 km	MPC · JPL
348534	2005 UH_{151}	—	October 26, 2005	Kitt Peak	Spacewatch	KOR	1.2 km	MPC · JPL
348535	2005 UX_{161}	—	October 25, 2005	Mount Lemmon	Mount Lemmon Survey	·	3.7 km	MPC · JPL
348536	2005 UL_{177}	—	October 24, 2005	Kitt Peak	Spacewatch	·	840 m	MPC · JPL
348537	2005 UA_{194}	—	October 22, 2005	Kitt Peak	Spacewatch	·	490 m	MPC · JPL
348538	2005 UA_{196}	—	October 24, 2005	Kitt Peak	Spacewatch	·	1.8 km	MPC · JPL
348539	2005 UV_{218}	—	October 25, 2005	Kitt Peak	Spacewatch	·	1.0 km	MPC · JPL
348540	2005 UG_{226}	—	October 25, 2005	Kitt Peak	Spacewatch	·	860 m	MPC · JPL
348541	2005 UQ_{228}	—	October 25, 2005	Kitt Peak	Spacewatch	EUN	1.6 km	MPC · JPL
348542	2005 UC_{251}	—	October 23, 2005	Palomar	NEAT	·	1.1 km	MPC · JPL
348543	2005 UO_{251}	—	October 23, 2005	Palomar	NEAT	·	1.1 km	MPC · JPL
348544	2005 UR_{270}	—	October 28, 2005	Catalina	CSS	·	3.9 km	MPC · JPL
348545	2005 UK_{286}	—	October 26, 2005	Kitt Peak	Spacewatch	·	710 m	MPC · JPL
348546	2005 UV_{299}	—	October 26, 2005	Kitt Peak	Spacewatch	·	790 m	MPC · JPL
348547	2005 UW_{321}	—	October 27, 2005	Kitt Peak	Spacewatch	·	1.1 km	MPC · JPL
348548	2005 UK_{344}	—	October 29, 2005	Kitt Peak	Spacewatch	·	740 m	MPC · JPL
348549	2005 UJ_{350}	—	October 28, 2005	Mount Lemmon	Mount Lemmon Survey	·	670 m	MPC · JPL
348550	2005 UB_{369}	—	October 27, 2005	Kitt Peak	Spacewatch	CYB	4.0 km	MPC · JPL
348551	2005 UQ_{370}	—	October 27, 2005	Kitt Peak	Spacewatch	·	1.0 km	MPC · JPL
348552	2005 UY_{416}	—	October 22, 2005	Catalina	CSS	·	2.4 km	MPC · JPL
348553	2005 UO_{425}	—	September 30, 2005	Mount Lemmon	Mount Lemmon Survey	GEF	1.2 km	MPC · JPL
348554	2005 UD_{427}	—	October 24, 2005	Kitt Peak	Spacewatch	·	930 m	MPC · JPL
348555	2005 UK_{461}	—	October 28, 2005	Mount Lemmon	Mount Lemmon Survey	·	1.1 km	MPC · JPL
348556	2005 UD_{476}	—	October 23, 2005	Palomar	NEAT	·	3.3 km	MPC · JPL
348557	2005 UB_{479}	—	October 28, 2005	Mount Lemmon	Mount Lemmon Survey	·	910 m	MPC · JPL
348558	2005 UF_{496}	—	October 26, 2005	Socorro	LINEAR	·	2.1 km	MPC · JPL
348559	2005 VS_{16}	—	November 3, 2005	Catalina	CSS	·	1.0 km	MPC · JPL
348560	2005 VW_{28}	—	November 4, 2005	Socorro	LINEAR	·	890 m	MPC · JPL
348561	2005 VL_{32}	—	November 4, 2005	Kitt Peak	Spacewatch	·	2.6 km	MPC · JPL
348562	2005 VM_{50}	—	November 2, 2005	Mount Lemmon	Mount Lemmon Survey	·	2.2 km	MPC · JPL
348563	2005 VO_{57}	—	November 4, 2005	Mount Lemmon	Mount Lemmon Survey	·	870 m	MPC · JPL
348564	2005 VG_{72}	—	October 31, 2005	Mount Lemmon	Mount Lemmon Survey	·	910 m	MPC · JPL
348565	2005 VW_{73}	—	November 1, 2005	Mount Lemmon	Mount Lemmon Survey	·	930 m	MPC · JPL
348566	2005 VP_{95}	—	November 6, 2005	Kitt Peak	Spacewatch	·	700 m	MPC · JPL
348567	2005 VJ_{98}	—	November 2, 2005	Socorro	LINEAR	·	3.5 km	MPC · JPL
348568	2005 VX_{118}	—	November 10, 2005	Kitt Peak	Spacewatch	·	1.1 km	MPC · JPL
348569	2005 VO_{126}	—	November 1, 2005	Apache Point	A. C. Becker	·	4.1 km	MPC · JPL
348570	2005 WS	—	November 20, 2005	La Silla	Behrend, R.	VER	4.0 km	MPC · JPL
348571	2005 WE_{4}	—	November 21, 2005	Anderson Mesa	LONEOS	·	5.2 km	MPC · JPL
348572	2005 WX_{5}	—	November 21, 2005	Anderson Mesa	LONEOS	·	980 m	MPC · JPL
348573	2005 WH_{20}	—	September 30, 2005	Mount Lemmon	Mount Lemmon Survey	·	760 m	MPC · JPL
348574	2005 WE_{29}	—	November 21, 2005	Kitt Peak	Spacewatch	·	1.5 km	MPC · JPL
348575	2005 WT_{30}	—	November 21, 2005	Kitt Peak	Spacewatch	·	970 m	MPC · JPL
348576	2005 WT_{44}	—	November 22, 2005	Kitt Peak	Spacewatch	·	800 m	MPC · JPL
348577	2005 WU_{71}	—	November 21, 2005	Palomar	NEAT	·	970 m	MPC · JPL
348578	2005 WN_{81}	—	November 26, 2005	Kitt Peak	Spacewatch	·	1.1 km	MPC · JPL
348579	2005 WY_{85}	—	November 28, 2005	Mount Lemmon	Mount Lemmon Survey	·	770 m	MPC · JPL
348580	2005 WZ_{87}	—	November 28, 2005	Mount Lemmon	Mount Lemmon Survey	·	860 m	MPC · JPL
348581	2005 WV_{88}	—	November 25, 2005	Kitt Peak	Spacewatch	·	890 m	MPC · JPL
348582	2005 WN_{90}	—	November 28, 2005	Socorro	LINEAR	·	850 m	MPC · JPL
348583	2005 WW_{90}	—	November 28, 2005	Socorro	LINEAR	·	1.0 km	MPC · JPL
348584	2005 WF_{106}	—	November 29, 2005	Socorro	LINEAR	PHO	1.6 km	MPC · JPL
348585	2005 WP_{111}	—	November 30, 2005	Socorro	LINEAR	·	900 m	MPC · JPL
348586	2005 WP_{118}	—	November 29, 2005	Socorro	LINEAR	·	850 m	MPC · JPL
348587	2005 WE_{123}	—	November 25, 2005	Mount Lemmon	Mount Lemmon Survey	EOS	2.2 km	MPC · JPL
348588	2005 WX_{142}	—	November 29, 2005	Mount Lemmon	Mount Lemmon Survey	·	780 m	MPC · JPL
348589	2005 WX_{145}	—	November 25, 2005	Kitt Peak	Spacewatch	·	820 m	MPC · JPL
348590	2005 WN_{148}	—	November 26, 2005	Mount Lemmon	Mount Lemmon Survey	EOS	2.8 km	MPC · JPL
348591	2005 WO_{149}	—	November 28, 2005	Kitt Peak	Spacewatch	·	790 m	MPC · JPL
348592	2005 WQ_{150}	—	November 28, 2005	Kitt Peak	Spacewatch	·	980 m	MPC · JPL
348593	2005 WF_{152}	—	November 28, 2005	Palomar	NEAT	·	1.4 km	MPC · JPL
348594	2005 WE_{159}	—	November 28, 2005	Catalina	CSS	·	2.3 km	MPC · JPL
348595	2005 XE_{1}	—	December 4, 2005	Catalina	CSS	AMO	550 m	MPC · JPL
348596	2005 XW_{3}	—	December 1, 2005	Socorro	LINEAR	·	960 m	MPC · JPL
348597	2005 XB_{4}	—	December 1, 2005	Palomar	NEAT	·	920 m	MPC · JPL
348598	2005 XK_{6}	—	December 2, 2005	Socorro	LINEAR	·	840 m	MPC · JPL
348599	2005 XL_{6}	—	December 2, 2005	Socorro	LINEAR	·	970 m	MPC · JPL
348600	2005 XV_{14}	—	December 1, 2005	Socorro	LINEAR	·	970 m	MPC · JPL

== 348601–348700 ==
back to top

Designation			Discovery			Properties		Ref
Permanent	Provisional	Named after	Date	Site	Discoverer(s)	Category	Diam.	Ref
348601	2005 XD_{20}	—	December 2, 2005	Kitt Peak	Spacewatch	·	3.8 km	MPC · JPL
348602	2005 XX_{23}	—	December 2, 2005	Socorro	LINEAR	V	690 m	MPC · JPL
348603	2005 XA_{35}	—	November 30, 2005	Kitt Peak	Spacewatch	·	900 m	MPC · JPL
348604	2005 XF_{41}	—	December 6, 2005	Kitt Peak	Spacewatch	(2076)	940 m	MPC · JPL
348605	2005 XN_{48}	—	December 2, 2005	Mount Lemmon	Mount Lemmon Survey	·	1.4 km	MPC · JPL
348606	2005 XJ_{65}	—	December 7, 2005	Kitt Peak	Spacewatch	PHO	3.2 km	MPC · JPL
348607	2005 XJ_{87}	—	October 27, 2005	Mount Lemmon	Mount Lemmon Survey	·	3.8 km	MPC · JPL
348608	2005 XH_{92}	—	December 6, 2005	Catalina	CSS	·	4.4 km	MPC · JPL
348609	2005 XL_{111}	—	December 1, 2005	Kitt Peak	M. W. Buie	·	1.5 km	MPC · JPL
348610	2005 XG_{116}	—	December 2, 2005	Kitt Peak	Spacewatch	·	820 m	MPC · JPL
348611	2005 XJ_{116}	—	December 2, 2005	Mount Lemmon	Mount Lemmon Survey	KOR	1.4 km	MPC · JPL
348612	2005 YP	—	December 21, 2005	Catalina	CSS	·	740 m	MPC · JPL
348613	2005 YG_{4}	—	October 28, 2005	Mount Lemmon	Mount Lemmon Survey	H	680 m	MPC · JPL
348614	2005 YQ_{5}	—	December 21, 2005	Kitt Peak	Spacewatch	·	1.5 km	MPC · JPL
348615	2005 YU_{13}	—	December 22, 2005	Kitt Peak	Spacewatch	·	1 km	MPC · JPL
348616	2005 YK_{15}	—	November 6, 2005	Mount Lemmon	Mount Lemmon Survey	·	4.6 km	MPC · JPL
348617	2005 YL_{26}	—	December 24, 2005	Kitt Peak	Spacewatch	·	1.9 km	MPC · JPL
348618	2005 YV_{30}	—	December 22, 2005	Kitt Peak	Spacewatch	·	2.6 km	MPC · JPL
348619	2005 YY_{41}	—	December 22, 2005	Kitt Peak	Spacewatch	·	750 m	MPC · JPL
348620	2005 YE_{52}	—	December 26, 2005	Mount Lemmon	Mount Lemmon Survey	·	1.0 km	MPC · JPL
348621	2005 YV_{52}	—	December 21, 2005	Catalina	CSS	·	930 m	MPC · JPL
348622	2005 YP_{65}	—	December 25, 2005	Kitt Peak	Spacewatch	·	750 m	MPC · JPL
348623	2005 YS_{65}	—	December 25, 2005	Mount Lemmon	Mount Lemmon Survey	V	750 m	MPC · JPL
348624	2005 YD_{66}	—	December 25, 2005	Kitt Peak	Spacewatch	·	1.0 km	MPC · JPL
348625	2005 YU_{67}	—	December 26, 2005	Kitt Peak	Spacewatch	V	750 m	MPC · JPL
348626	2005 YT_{85}	—	December 25, 2005	Mount Lemmon	Mount Lemmon Survey	·	870 m	MPC · JPL
348627	2005 YK_{91}	—	December 26, 2005	Mount Lemmon	Mount Lemmon Survey	V	750 m	MPC · JPL
348628	2005 YV_{95}	—	December 25, 2005	Kitt Peak	Spacewatch	·	1.4 km	MPC · JPL
348629	2005 YW_{109}	—	December 25, 2005	Kitt Peak	Spacewatch	·	820 m	MPC · JPL
348630	2005 YB_{120}	—	December 27, 2005	Mount Lemmon	Mount Lemmon Survey	·	3.4 km	MPC · JPL
348631	2005 YN_{121}	—	December 28, 2005	Mount Lemmon	Mount Lemmon Survey	·	1.5 km	MPC · JPL
348632	2005 YY_{126}	—	December 27, 2005	Catalina	CSS	·	840 m	MPC · JPL
348633	2005 YM_{130}	—	December 25, 2005	Mount Lemmon	Mount Lemmon Survey	MAS	570 m	MPC · JPL
348634	2005 YL_{132}	—	December 25, 2005	Mount Lemmon	Mount Lemmon Survey	·	1.1 km	MPC · JPL
348635	2005 YV_{142}	—	December 28, 2005	Mount Lemmon	Mount Lemmon Survey	MAS	850 m	MPC · JPL
348636	2005 YX_{142}	—	December 28, 2005	Mount Lemmon	Mount Lemmon Survey	NYS	1.1 km	MPC · JPL
348637	2005 YW_{147}	—	December 24, 2005	Kitt Peak	Spacewatch	·	1.2 km	MPC · JPL
348638	2005 YE_{164}	—	December 29, 2005	Kitt Peak	Spacewatch	·	2.4 km	MPC · JPL
348639	2005 YN_{167}	—	December 27, 2005	Kitt Peak	Spacewatch	·	1.2 km	MPC · JPL
348640	2005 YZ_{167}	—	December 28, 2005	Kitt Peak	Spacewatch	·	910 m	MPC · JPL
348641	2005 YM_{168}	—	December 29, 2005	Kitt Peak	Spacewatch	V	760 m	MPC · JPL
348642	2005 YY_{174}	—	December 30, 2005	Socorro	LINEAR	H	680 m	MPC · JPL
348643	2005 YT_{175}	—	December 22, 2005	Kitt Peak	Spacewatch	MAS	710 m	MPC · JPL
348644	2005 YN_{186}	—	December 29, 2005	Socorro	LINEAR	PHO	930 m	MPC · JPL
348645	2005 YD_{187}	—	December 28, 2005	Kitt Peak	Spacewatch	·	2.9 km	MPC · JPL
348646	2005 YT_{188}	—	December 28, 2005	Mount Lemmon	Mount Lemmon Survey	·	1.4 km	MPC · JPL
348647	2005 YD_{196}	—	December 25, 2005	Catalina	CSS	·	1.8 km	MPC · JPL
348648	2005 YG_{196}	—	December 24, 2005	Kitt Peak	Spacewatch	·	940 m	MPC · JPL
348649	2005 YZ_{203}	—	December 25, 2005	Mount Lemmon	Mount Lemmon Survey	·	1.0 km	MPC · JPL
348650	2005 YP_{217}	—	December 30, 2005	Mount Lemmon	Mount Lemmon Survey	·	880 m	MPC · JPL
348651	2005 YL_{218}	—	December 30, 2005	Mount Lemmon	Mount Lemmon Survey	NYS	1.1 km	MPC · JPL
348652	2005 YV_{219}	—	December 31, 2005	Kitt Peak	Spacewatch	·	660 m	MPC · JPL
348653	2005 YF_{246}	—	December 30, 2005	Kitt Peak	Spacewatch	·	960 m	MPC · JPL
348654	2005 YT_{250}	—	December 28, 2005	Kitt Peak	Spacewatch	·	1.1 km	MPC · JPL
348655	2005 YS_{264}	—	December 25, 2005	Kitt Peak	Spacewatch	·	1.2 km	MPC · JPL
348656	2005 YR_{266}	—	December 24, 2005	Kitt Peak	Spacewatch	·	2.4 km	MPC · JPL
348657	2005 YU_{271}	—	December 28, 2005	Mount Lemmon	Mount Lemmon Survey	V	970 m	MPC · JPL
348658	2005 YJ_{272}	—	December 29, 2005	Kitt Peak	Spacewatch	NYS	1.1 km	MPC · JPL
348659	2005 YW_{280}	—	December 25, 2005	Mount Lemmon	Mount Lemmon Survey	NYS	830 m	MPC · JPL
348660	2006 AU_{10}	—	January 4, 2006	Catalina	CSS	·	1.2 km	MPC · JPL
348661	2006 AR_{13}	—	January 5, 2006	Mount Lemmon	Mount Lemmon Survey	DOR	3.1 km	MPC · JPL
348662	2006 AH_{54}	—	January 5, 2006	Kitt Peak	Spacewatch	·	690 m	MPC · JPL
348663	2006 AK_{68}	—	January 5, 2006	Mount Lemmon	Mount Lemmon Survey	·	1.3 km	MPC · JPL
348664	2006 AE_{90}	—	November 30, 2005	Mount Lemmon	Mount Lemmon Survey	·	2.3 km	MPC · JPL
348665	2006 BV_{2}	—	January 20, 2006	Catalina	CSS	·	1.8 km	MPC · JPL
348666	2006 BR_{10}	—	January 20, 2006	Kitt Peak	Spacewatch	·	1.1 km	MPC · JPL
348667	2006 BX_{11}	—	January 21, 2006	Kitt Peak	Spacewatch	·	1.3 km	MPC · JPL
348668	2006 BT_{16}	—	January 22, 2006	Mount Lemmon	Mount Lemmon Survey	·	1.3 km	MPC · JPL
348669	2006 BF_{18}	—	January 22, 2006	Mount Lemmon	Mount Lemmon Survey	·	1.5 km	MPC · JPL
348670	2006 BX_{19}	—	January 22, 2006	Anderson Mesa	LONEOS	ERI	1.8 km	MPC · JPL
348671	2006 BZ_{41}	—	January 22, 2006	Mount Lemmon	Mount Lemmon Survey	·	1.5 km	MPC · JPL
348672	2006 BX_{51}	—	January 25, 2006	Kitt Peak	Spacewatch	·	1.3 km	MPC · JPL
348673	2006 BR_{58}	—	January 23, 2006	Kitt Peak	Spacewatch	·	1.6 km	MPC · JPL
348674	2006 BA_{61}	—	January 22, 2006	Catalina	CSS	PHO	1.3 km	MPC · JPL
348675	2006 BU_{61}	—	January 22, 2006	Catalina	CSS	PHO	1.3 km	MPC · JPL
348676	2006 BL_{64}	—	January 22, 2006	Mount Lemmon	Mount Lemmon Survey	NYS	1.0 km	MPC · JPL
348677	2006 BY_{65}	—	January 23, 2006	Kitt Peak	Spacewatch	NYS	1.3 km	MPC · JPL
348678	2006 BB_{74}	—	October 7, 2005	Mauna Kea	A. Boattini	·	1.4 km	MPC · JPL
348679	2006 BL_{75}	—	January 23, 2006	Kitt Peak	Spacewatch	NYS	1.5 km	MPC · JPL
348680	2006 BO_{75}	—	January 23, 2006	Kitt Peak	Spacewatch	NYS	1.6 km	MPC · JPL
348681	2006 BF_{76}	—	January 23, 2006	Kitt Peak	Spacewatch	·	1.2 km	MPC · JPL
348682	2006 BE_{77}	—	January 23, 2006	Mount Lemmon	Mount Lemmon Survey	·	1.3 km	MPC · JPL
348683	2006 BS_{85}	—	January 25, 2006	Kitt Peak	Spacewatch	MAS	640 m	MPC · JPL
348684	2006 BC_{89}	—	January 25, 2006	Kitt Peak	Spacewatch	NYS	1.4 km	MPC · JPL
348685	2006 BS_{90}	—	January 25, 2006	Kitt Peak	Spacewatch	MAS	650 m	MPC · JPL
348686	2006 BH_{91}	—	January 26, 2006	Kitt Peak	Spacewatch	V	720 m	MPC · JPL
348687	2006 BC_{96}	—	January 7, 2006	Mount Lemmon	Mount Lemmon Survey	·	1.1 km	MPC · JPL
348688	2006 BX_{98}	—	January 25, 2006	Kitt Peak	Spacewatch	NYS	1.0 km	MPC · JPL
348689	2006 BD_{103}	—	October 24, 2005	Mauna Kea	A. Boattini	3:2 · SHU	4.0 km	MPC · JPL
348690	2006 BD_{105}	—	January 25, 2006	Kitt Peak	Spacewatch	·	1.0 km	MPC · JPL
348691	2006 BF_{108}	—	January 25, 2006	Kitt Peak	Spacewatch	V	760 m	MPC · JPL
348692	2006 BF_{110}	—	January 25, 2006	Kitt Peak	Spacewatch	·	1.4 km	MPC · JPL
348693	2006 BP_{116}	—	January 26, 2006	Kitt Peak	Spacewatch	·	1.2 km	MPC · JPL
348694	2006 BT_{135}	—	January 27, 2006	Mount Lemmon	Mount Lemmon Survey	NYS	1.1 km	MPC · JPL
348695	2006 BG_{163}	—	January 26, 2006	Mount Lemmon	Mount Lemmon Survey	MAS	590 m	MPC · JPL
348696	2006 BL_{177}	—	January 27, 2006	Mount Lemmon	Mount Lemmon Survey	·	770 m	MPC · JPL
348697	2006 BD_{183}	—	January 7, 2006	Mount Lemmon	Mount Lemmon Survey	·	2.3 km	MPC · JPL
348698	2006 BO_{193}	—	January 30, 2006	Kitt Peak	Spacewatch	·	950 m	MPC · JPL
348699	2006 BK_{205}	—	January 31, 2006	Kitt Peak	Spacewatch	MAS	740 m	MPC · JPL
348700	2006 BA_{214}	—	January 23, 2006	Socorro	LINEAR	ERI	1.4 km	MPC · JPL

== 348701–348800 ==
back to top

Designation			Discovery			Properties		Ref
Permanent	Provisional	Named after	Date	Site	Discoverer(s)	Category	Diam.	Ref
348701	2006 BM_{224}	—	January 30, 2006	Kitt Peak	Spacewatch	·	980 m	MPC · JPL
348702	2006 BR_{245}	—	January 31, 2006	Kitt Peak	Spacewatch	·	1.5 km	MPC · JPL
348703	2006 BM_{269}	—	January 28, 2006	Catalina	CSS	·	1.4 km	MPC · JPL
348704	2006 BU_{274}	—	January 23, 2006	Kitt Peak	Spacewatch	L5	10 km	MPC · JPL
348705	2006 BG_{276}	—	January 31, 2006	Kitt Peak	Spacewatch	V	860 m	MPC · JPL
348706	2006 BF_{278}	—	January 21, 2006	Mount Lemmon	Mount Lemmon Survey	MAS	680 m	MPC · JPL
348707	2006 CL_{3}	—	February 1, 2006	Mount Lemmon	Mount Lemmon Survey	·	1.1 km	MPC · JPL
348708	2006 CO_{9}	—	February 4, 2006	7300	W. K. Y. Yeung	·	2.9 km	MPC · JPL
348709	2006 CH_{26}	—	February 2, 2006	Kitt Peak	Spacewatch	MAS	770 m	MPC · JPL
348710	2006 CR_{29}	—	February 2, 2006	Kitt Peak	Spacewatch	·	1.2 km	MPC · JPL
348711	2006 CA_{44}	—	February 2, 2006	Kitt Peak	Spacewatch	·	2.5 km	MPC · JPL
348712	2006 CO_{68}	—	February 7, 2006	Mount Lemmon	Mount Lemmon Survey	·	1.3 km	MPC · JPL
348713	2006 DJ_{17}	—	February 20, 2006	Kitt Peak	Spacewatch	·	1.7 km	MPC · JPL
348714	2006 DF_{34}	—	February 20, 2006	Kitt Peak	Spacewatch	·	1.7 km	MPC · JPL
348715	2006 DW_{36}	—	February 20, 2006	Kitt Peak	Spacewatch	·	2.1 km	MPC · JPL
348716	2006 DK_{39}	—	February 21, 2006	Mount Lemmon	Mount Lemmon Survey	·	820 m	MPC · JPL
348717	2006 DR_{41}	—	February 23, 2006	Kitt Peak	Spacewatch	·	1.4 km	MPC · JPL
348718	2006 DO_{42}	—	February 20, 2006	Kitt Peak	Spacewatch	·	1.7 km	MPC · JPL
348719	2006 DF_{47}	—	February 21, 2006	Anderson Mesa	LONEOS	·	3.9 km	MPC · JPL
348720	2006 DY_{50}	—	February 23, 2006	Eskridge	Farpoint	V	700 m	MPC · JPL
348721	2006 DJ_{70}	—	February 20, 2006	Kitt Peak	Spacewatch	EUN	1.7 km	MPC · JPL
348722	2006 DS_{71}	—	February 21, 2006	Mount Lemmon	Mount Lemmon Survey	·	2.1 km	MPC · JPL
348723	2006 DN_{106}	—	March 21, 2002	Kitt Peak	Spacewatch	·	1.2 km	MPC · JPL
348724	2006 DP_{120}	—	February 21, 2006	Catalina	CSS	·	1.6 km	MPC · JPL
348725	2006 DC_{125}	—	February 25, 2006	Kitt Peak	Spacewatch	CLA	1.8 km	MPC · JPL
348726	2006 DP_{157}	—	February 27, 2006	Kitt Peak	Spacewatch	MAS	740 m	MPC · JPL
348727	2006 DB_{163}	—	February 27, 2006	Mount Lemmon	Mount Lemmon Survey	·	1.3 km	MPC · JPL
348728	2006 DH_{216}	—	February 25, 2006	Mount Lemmon	Mount Lemmon Survey	·	1.0 km	MPC · JPL
348729	2006 EP_{44}	—	March 5, 2006	Kitt Peak	Spacewatch	·	1.4 km	MPC · JPL
348730	2006 EK_{46}	—	March 4, 2006	Kitt Peak	Spacewatch	MAS	760 m	MPC · JPL
348731	2006 EH_{47}	—	March 4, 2006	Kitt Peak	Spacewatch	·	950 m	MPC · JPL
348732	2006 FT_{7}	—	March 23, 2006	Kitt Peak	Spacewatch	·	1.3 km	MPC · JPL
348733	2006 FH_{17}	—	March 23, 2006	Mount Lemmon	Mount Lemmon Survey	·	1.2 km	MPC · JPL
348734	2006 FX_{19}	—	March 23, 2006	Mount Lemmon	Mount Lemmon Survey	·	1.7 km	MPC · JPL
348735	2006 FV_{22}	—	March 24, 2006	Mount Lemmon	Mount Lemmon Survey	·	1.4 km	MPC · JPL
348736	2006 FP_{35}	—	March 28, 2006	Lulin	Q. Ye	·	1.7 km	MPC · JPL
348737	2006 FN_{41}	—	March 26, 2006	Mount Lemmon	Mount Lemmon Survey	NYS	1.3 km	MPC · JPL
348738	2006 FQ_{51}	—	March 25, 2006	Kitt Peak	Spacewatch	·	1.7 km	MPC · JPL
348739	2006 GS_{3}	—	April 6, 2006	Great Shefford	Birtwhistle, P.	3:2	6.1 km	MPC · JPL
348740	2006 GH_{4}	—	April 2, 2006	Kitt Peak	Spacewatch	·	1.9 km	MPC · JPL
348741	2006 GK_{25}	—	April 2, 2006	Kitt Peak	Spacewatch	·	1.7 km	MPC · JPL
348742	2006 GB_{31}	—	April 2, 2006	Kitt Peak	Spacewatch	·	1.3 km	MPC · JPL
348743	2006 HG_{5}	—	April 19, 2006	Catalina	CSS	EUN	1.7 km	MPC · JPL
348744	2006 HZ_{9}	—	April 19, 2006	Kitt Peak	Spacewatch	·	1.7 km	MPC · JPL
348745	2006 HB_{10}	—	April 19, 2006	Kitt Peak	Spacewatch	·	1.4 km	MPC · JPL
348746	2006 HK_{15}	—	April 19, 2006	Catalina	CSS	·	1.6 km	MPC · JPL
348747	2006 HN_{16}	—	April 20, 2006	Kitt Peak	Spacewatch	·	2.1 km	MPC · JPL
348748	2006 HO_{24}	—	April 20, 2006	Kitt Peak	Spacewatch	·	3.7 km	MPC · JPL
348749	2006 HG_{40}	—	April 21, 2006	Kitt Peak	Spacewatch	·	1.0 km	MPC · JPL
348750	2006 HQ_{41}	—	April 21, 2006	Kitt Peak	Spacewatch	·	1.8 km	MPC · JPL
348751	2006 HT_{43}	—	April 24, 2006	Mount Lemmon	Mount Lemmon Survey	·	830 m	MPC · JPL
348752	2006 HX_{49}	—	April 26, 2006	Kitt Peak	Spacewatch	MAS	820 m	MPC · JPL
348753	2006 HH_{54}	—	April 20, 2006	Catalina	CSS	·	1.1 km	MPC · JPL
348754	2006 HZ_{62}	—	April 8, 2006	Kitt Peak	Spacewatch	·	1.5 km	MPC · JPL
348755	2006 HD_{66}	—	April 24, 2006	Kitt Peak	Spacewatch	·	2.4 km	MPC · JPL
348756	2006 HS_{73}	—	April 25, 2006	Kitt Peak	Spacewatch	WIT	1.3 km	MPC · JPL
348757	2006 HS_{80}	—	April 26, 2006	Kitt Peak	Spacewatch	·	1.5 km	MPC · JPL
348758	2006 HS_{91}	—	April 29, 2006	Kitt Peak	Spacewatch	·	1.2 km	MPC · JPL
348759	2006 HB_{93}	—	April 29, 2006	Kitt Peak	Spacewatch	·	1.7 km	MPC · JPL
348760	2006 HK_{107}	—	April 30, 2006	Kitt Peak	Spacewatch	·	1.9 km	MPC · JPL
348761	2006 HT_{107}	—	April 30, 2006	Kitt Peak	Spacewatch	EUN	1.6 km	MPC · JPL
348762	2006 HS_{111}	—	April 29, 2006	Siding Spring	SSS	·	3.5 km	MPC · JPL
348763	2006 HD_{153}	—	April 26, 2006	Mount Lemmon	Mount Lemmon Survey	·	1.7 km	MPC · JPL
348764	2006 JM_{21}	—	May 2, 2006	Kitt Peak	Spacewatch	·	1.3 km	MPC · JPL
348765	2006 JC_{23}	—	May 3, 2006	Mount Lemmon	Mount Lemmon Survey	MAS	850 m	MPC · JPL
348766	2006 JW_{34}	—	May 4, 2006	Kitt Peak	Spacewatch	·	1.9 km	MPC · JPL
348767	2006 JW_{36}	—	May 4, 2006	Kitt Peak	Spacewatch	·	2.6 km	MPC · JPL
348768	2006 JJ_{40}	—	May 7, 2006	Mount Lemmon	Mount Lemmon Survey	·	1.5 km	MPC · JPL
348769	2006 JR_{43}	—	April 7, 2006	Kitt Peak	Spacewatch	H	520 m	MPC · JPL
348770	2006 JL_{53}	—	May 6, 2006	Kitt Peak	Spacewatch	·	1.7 km	MPC · JPL
348771	2006 KQ	—	May 17, 2006	Palomar	NEAT	·	1.6 km	MPC · JPL
348772	2006 KN_{15}	—	May 20, 2006	Kitt Peak	Spacewatch	·	2.4 km	MPC · JPL
348773	2006 KX_{23}	—	May 19, 2006	Anderson Mesa	LONEOS	·	2.5 km	MPC · JPL
348774	2006 KG_{27}	—	May 20, 2006	Mount Lemmon	Mount Lemmon Survey	·	2.3 km	MPC · JPL
348775	2006 KR_{35}	—	May 20, 2006	Kitt Peak	Spacewatch	·	2.5 km	MPC · JPL
348776	2006 KZ_{37}	—	May 24, 2006	Catalina	CSS	AMO · APO	520 m	MPC · JPL
348777	2006 KX_{50}	—	May 21, 2006	Kitt Peak	Spacewatch	·	2.1 km	MPC · JPL
348778	2006 KS_{53}	—	May 21, 2006	Kitt Peak	Spacewatch	·	980 m	MPC · JPL
348779	2006 KJ_{54}	—	May 21, 2006	Kitt Peak	Spacewatch	·	1.5 km	MPC · JPL
348780	2006 KD_{57}	—	May 22, 2006	Kitt Peak	Spacewatch	·	3.4 km	MPC · JPL
348781	2006 KB_{60}	—	May 22, 2006	Kitt Peak	Spacewatch	·	1.3 km	MPC · JPL
348782	2006 KY_{61}	—	May 22, 2006	Kitt Peak	Spacewatch	·	2.0 km	MPC · JPL
348783	2006 KJ_{86}	—	May 24, 2006	Anderson Mesa	LONEOS	·	2.0 km	MPC · JPL
348784	2006 KK_{112}	—	May 31, 2006	Mount Lemmon	Mount Lemmon Survey	·	1.7 km	MPC · JPL
348785	2006 OD_{12}	—	July 21, 2006	Catalina	CSS	·	3.5 km	MPC · JPL
348786	2006 OG_{20}	—	July 18, 2006	Siding Spring	SSS	·	1.8 km	MPC · JPL
348787	2006 PX_{5}	—	August 12, 2006	Palomar	NEAT	L4	15 km	MPC · JPL
348788	2006 PK_{7}	—	August 12, 2006	Palomar	NEAT	·	5.4 km	MPC · JPL
348789	2006 PF_{10}	—	August 13, 2006	Palomar	NEAT	·	780 m	MPC · JPL
348790	2006 PM_{14}	—	May 10, 2006	Mount Lemmon	Mount Lemmon Survey	·	3.1 km	MPC · JPL
348791	2006 PY_{22}	—	August 15, 2006	Palomar	NEAT	·	1.6 km	MPC · JPL
348792	2006 PA_{30}	—	August 12, 2006	Lulin	Lin, H.-C., Q. Ye	·	1.2 km	MPC · JPL
348793	2006 QH_{3}	—	August 17, 2006	Palomar	NEAT	·	2.2 km	MPC · JPL
348794	2006 QC_{9}	—	August 19, 2006	Kitt Peak	Spacewatch	·	2.6 km	MPC · JPL
348795	2006 QL_{10}	—	August 19, 2006	Reedy Creek	J. Broughton	·	2.5 km	MPC · JPL
348796	2006 QX_{26}	—	July 18, 2006	Mount Lemmon	Mount Lemmon Survey	·	1.2 km	MPC · JPL
348797	2006 QO_{29}	—	August 17, 2006	Palomar	NEAT	·	840 m	MPC · JPL
348798	2006 QG_{30}	—	August 20, 2006	Palomar	NEAT	·	2.0 km	MPC · JPL
348799	2006 QT_{33}	—	August 23, 2006	Charleston	Astronomical Research Observatory	·	2.8 km	MPC · JPL
348800	2006 QK_{43}	—	August 18, 2006	Anderson Mesa	LONEOS	·	3.8 km	MPC · JPL

== 348801–348900 ==
back to top

Designation			Discovery			Properties		Ref
Permanent	Provisional	Named after	Date	Site	Discoverer(s)	Category	Diam.	Ref
348801	2006 QZ_{43}	—	July 31, 2006	Siding Spring	SSS	T_{j} (2.99) · EUP	4.2 km	MPC · JPL
348802	2006 QF_{58}	—	August 17, 2006	Palomar	NEAT	PHO	2.8 km	MPC · JPL
348803	2006 QS_{105}	—	August 28, 2006	Catalina	CSS	·	2.4 km	MPC · JPL
348804	2006 QG_{115}	—	August 27, 2006	Anderson Mesa	LONEOS	·	1.4 km	MPC · JPL
348805	2006 QQ_{126}	—	August 16, 2006	Palomar	NEAT	TIR	3.2 km	MPC · JPL
348806	2006 QL_{128}	—	August 17, 2006	Palomar	NEAT	H	710 m	MPC · JPL
348807	2006 QM_{128}	—	August 17, 2006	Palomar	NEAT	·	2.6 km	MPC · JPL
348808	2006 QR_{142}	—	August 29, 2006	Anderson Mesa	LONEOS	·	4.0 km	MPC · JPL
348809	2006 QW_{160}	—	August 19, 2006	Kitt Peak	Spacewatch	·	2.0 km	MPC · JPL
348810	2006 QJ_{164}	—	August 29, 2006	Anderson Mesa	LONEOS	·	2.0 km	MPC · JPL
348811	2006 QO_{164}	—	August 29, 2006	Anderson Mesa	LONEOS	·	4.4 km	MPC · JPL
348812	2006 QP_{183}	—	August 29, 2006	Lulin	Lin, H.-C., Q. Ye	·	2.0 km	MPC · JPL
348813	2006 QK_{186}	—	August 19, 2006	Kitt Peak	Spacewatch	·	3.1 km	MPC · JPL
348814	2006 QN_{186}	—	August 19, 2006	Kitt Peak	Spacewatch	·	1.8 km	MPC · JPL
348815	2006 RA_{3}	—	September 1, 2006	Socorro	LINEAR	BRA	2.1 km	MPC · JPL
348816	2006 RF_{15}	—	September 14, 2006	Kitt Peak	Spacewatch	·	1.6 km	MPC · JPL
348817	2006 RE_{16}	—	September 14, 2006	Palomar	NEAT	TIR	3.0 km	MPC · JPL
348818	2006 RM_{17}	—	August 29, 2006	Anderson Mesa	LONEOS	EOS	2.8 km	MPC · JPL
348819	2006 RQ_{27}	—	September 14, 2006	Palomar	NEAT	·	3.9 km	MPC · JPL
348820	2006 RN_{30}	—	September 15, 2006	Kitt Peak	Spacewatch	NYS	1.0 km	MPC · JPL
348821	2006 RA_{38}	—	September 12, 2006	Catalina	CSS	LUT	5.9 km	MPC · JPL
348822	2006 RF_{46}	—	September 14, 2006	Kitt Peak	Spacewatch	THM	2.2 km	MPC · JPL
348823	2006 RS_{46}	—	September 14, 2006	Kitt Peak	Spacewatch	·	2.1 km	MPC · JPL
348824	2006 RX_{50}	—	September 14, 2006	Kitt Peak	Spacewatch	EOS	1.8 km	MPC · JPL
348825	2006 RV_{54}	—	September 14, 2006	Kitt Peak	Spacewatch	·	2.6 km	MPC · JPL
348826	2006 RY_{56}	—	September 14, 2006	Kitt Peak	Spacewatch	EOS	2.2 km	MPC · JPL
348827	2006 RF_{58}	—	September 15, 2006	Kitt Peak	Spacewatch	MAR	2.0 km	MPC · JPL
348828	2006 RJ_{59}	—	September 15, 2006	Kitt Peak	Spacewatch	·	2.3 km	MPC · JPL
348829	2006 RX_{62}	—	September 14, 2006	Catalina	CSS	·	3.6 km	MPC · JPL
348830	2006 RQ_{68}	—	September 15, 2006	Kitt Peak	Spacewatch	·	1.8 km	MPC · JPL
348831	2006 RD_{78}	—	September 15, 2006	Kitt Peak	Spacewatch	THM	2.4 km	MPC · JPL
348832	2006 RC_{81}	—	September 15, 2006	Kitt Peak	Spacewatch	·	3.4 km	MPC · JPL
348833	2006 RX_{83}	—	September 15, 2006	Kitt Peak	Spacewatch	·	2.2 km	MPC · JPL
348834	2006 RV_{92}	—	September 15, 2006	Kitt Peak	Spacewatch	·	2.5 km	MPC · JPL
348835	2006 RL_{98}	—	August 16, 2006	Palomar	NEAT	·	4.0 km	MPC · JPL
348836	2006 RN_{108}	—	September 14, 2006	Mauna Kea	Masiero, J.	·	2.2 km	MPC · JPL
348837	2006 RO_{110}	—	September 14, 2006	Mauna Kea	Masiero, J.	·	2.0 km	MPC · JPL
348838	2006 RO_{121}	—	September 14, 2006	Kitt Peak	Spacewatch	·	3.5 km	MPC · JPL
348839	2006 SE_{4}	—	September 16, 2006	Catalina	CSS	·	2.8 km	MPC · JPL
348840	2006 SK_{7}	—	September 18, 2006	Kitt Peak	Spacewatch	TEL	1.6 km	MPC · JPL
348841	2006 SC_{11}	—	September 16, 2006	Kitt Peak	Spacewatch	EOS	2.3 km	MPC · JPL
348842	2006 SL_{15}	—	September 17, 2006	Catalina	CSS	·	3.5 km	MPC · JPL
348843	2006 SB_{24}	—	September 18, 2006	Catalina	CSS	·	4.3 km	MPC · JPL
348844	2006 SQ_{32}	—	September 17, 2006	Kitt Peak	Spacewatch	EOS	1.9 km	MPC · JPL
348845	2006 SO_{36}	—	September 17, 2006	Anderson Mesa	LONEOS	·	4.0 km	MPC · JPL
348846	2006 SB_{40}	—	September 18, 2006	Catalina	CSS	·	1.7 km	MPC · JPL
348847	2006 SC_{41}	—	September 18, 2006	Catalina	CSS	·	3.9 km	MPC · JPL
348848	2006 SK_{59}	—	September 16, 2006	Catalina	CSS	·	3.6 km	MPC · JPL
348849	2006 SR_{71}	—	September 19, 2006	Kitt Peak	Spacewatch	KON	2.6 km	MPC · JPL
348850	2006 SY_{73}	—	September 19, 2006	Kitt Peak	Spacewatch	·	1.2 km	MPC · JPL
348851	2006 SP_{79}	—	September 17, 2006	Catalina	CSS	·	4.6 km	MPC · JPL
348852	2006 ST_{86}	—	September 18, 2006	Kitt Peak	Spacewatch	EOS	1.8 km	MPC · JPL
348853	2006 SP_{88}	—	September 18, 2006	Kitt Peak	Spacewatch	·	2.6 km	MPC · JPL
348854	2006 SB_{89}	—	September 18, 2006	Kitt Peak	Spacewatch	·	2.6 km	MPC · JPL
348855	2006 SG_{98}	—	September 18, 2006	Kitt Peak	Spacewatch	·	2.9 km	MPC · JPL
348856	2006 SQ_{128}	—	September 17, 2006	Catalina	CSS	TIR	3.2 km	MPC · JPL
348857	2006 SR_{128}	—	September 17, 2006	Catalina	CSS	·	4.1 km	MPC · JPL
348858	2006 SW_{128}	—	September 17, 2006	Catalina	CSS	·	3.0 km	MPC · JPL
348859	2006 SA_{129}	—	September 17, 2006	Catalina	CSS	·	3.4 km	MPC · JPL
348860	2006 SU_{130}	—	September 22, 2006	Anderson Mesa	LONEOS	·	3.7 km	MPC · JPL
348861	2006 SD_{132}	—	September 16, 2006	Catalina	CSS	·	4.0 km	MPC · JPL
348862	2006 SK_{133}	—	September 17, 2006	Catalina	CSS	EOS	1.9 km	MPC · JPL
348863	2006 SQ_{138}	—	September 20, 2006	Palomar	NEAT	·	3.2 km	MPC · JPL
348864	2006 SG_{139}	—	September 21, 2006	Anderson Mesa	LONEOS	·	3.9 km	MPC · JPL
348865	2006 SO_{141}	—	September 25, 2006	Anderson Mesa	LONEOS	·	3.1 km	MPC · JPL
348866	2006 SH_{144}	—	September 19, 2006	Kitt Peak	Spacewatch	HYG	2.0 km	MPC · JPL
348867	2006 SO_{145}	—	September 15, 2006	Kitt Peak	Spacewatch	·	3.7 km	MPC · JPL
348868	2006 SR_{152}	—	September 19, 2006	Catalina	CSS	·	3.4 km	MPC · JPL
348869	2006 SN_{157}	—	September 23, 2006	Kitt Peak	Spacewatch	·	4.1 km	MPC · JPL
348870	2006 SO_{160}	—	September 23, 2006	Kitt Peak	Spacewatch	·	2.8 km	MPC · JPL
348871	2006 SS_{162}	—	September 24, 2006	Kitt Peak	Spacewatch	THM	2.2 km	MPC · JPL
348872	2006 SN_{176}	—	September 25, 2006	Kitt Peak	Spacewatch	·	3.0 km	MPC · JPL
348873	2006 SC_{182}	—	September 25, 2006	Anderson Mesa	LONEOS	·	1.9 km	MPC · JPL
348874	2006 SM_{199}	—	September 24, 2006	Kitt Peak	Spacewatch	THM	2.2 km	MPC · JPL
348875	2006 SP_{201}	—	September 24, 2006	Kitt Peak	Spacewatch	·	2.7 km	MPC · JPL
348876	2006 SR_{201}	—	September 24, 2006	Kitt Peak	Spacewatch	·	2.8 km	MPC · JPL
348877	2006 SS_{202}	—	September 25, 2006	Kitt Peak	Spacewatch	·	2.6 km	MPC · JPL
348878	2006 SX_{205}	—	September 25, 2006	Anderson Mesa	LONEOS	·	4.5 km	MPC · JPL
348879	2006 SJ_{210}	—	September 26, 2006	Mount Lemmon	Mount Lemmon Survey	THM	1.8 km	MPC · JPL
348880	2006 SY_{211}	—	September 18, 2006	Kitt Peak	Spacewatch	·	2.7 km	MPC · JPL
348881	2006 SR_{218}	—	September 29, 2006	Kitami	K. Endate	·	780 m	MPC · JPL
348882	2006 SP_{240}	—	September 18, 2006	Kitt Peak	Spacewatch	·	3.1 km	MPC · JPL
348883	2006 SF_{245}	—	September 18, 2006	Kitt Peak	Spacewatch	·	2.4 km	MPC · JPL
348884	2006 SN_{259}	—	September 26, 2006	Kitt Peak	Spacewatch	·	2.7 km	MPC · JPL
348885	2006 SQ_{259}	—	September 26, 2006	Kitt Peak	Spacewatch	KOR	1.3 km	MPC · JPL
348886	2006 SF_{264}	—	September 26, 2006	Kitt Peak	Spacewatch	(5651)	3.4 km	MPC · JPL
348887	2006 SU_{265}	—	September 26, 2006	Kitt Peak	Spacewatch	·	2.5 km	MPC · JPL
348888	2006 SX_{266}	—	September 26, 2006	Kitt Peak	Spacewatch	·	2.2 km	MPC · JPL
348889	2006 SD_{268}	—	September 26, 2006	Kitt Peak	Spacewatch	EOS	2.2 km	MPC · JPL
348890	2006 SC_{270}	—	September 26, 2006	Catalina	CSS	·	1.5 km	MPC · JPL
348891	2006 SC_{274}	—	September 27, 2006	Mount Lemmon	Mount Lemmon Survey	·	1.1 km	MPC · JPL
348892	2006 SA_{294}	—	September 25, 2006	Kitt Peak	Spacewatch	·	2.3 km	MPC · JPL
348893	2006 SF_{301}	—	September 26, 2006	Mount Lemmon	Mount Lemmon Survey	·	2.7 km	MPC · JPL
348894	2006 ST_{314}	—	September 27, 2006	Kitt Peak	Spacewatch	·	3.1 km	MPC · JPL
348895	2006 SS_{334}	—	September 28, 2006	Kitt Peak	Spacewatch	·	2.5 km	MPC · JPL
348896	2006 SE_{339}	—	September 28, 2006	Kitt Peak	Spacewatch	·	3.0 km	MPC · JPL
348897	2006 SA_{343}	—	September 28, 2006	Kitt Peak	Spacewatch	VER	2.8 km	MPC · JPL
348898	2006 SF_{347}	—	September 28, 2006	Kitt Peak	Spacewatch	·	3.5 km	MPC · JPL
348899	2006 SX_{348}	—	September 28, 2006	Kitt Peak	Spacewatch	·	2.0 km	MPC · JPL
348900	2006 SR_{357}	—	September 30, 2006	Mount Lemmon	Mount Lemmon Survey	EOS	2.1 km	MPC · JPL

== 348901–349000 ==
back to top

Designation			Discovery			Properties		Ref
Permanent	Provisional	Named after	Date	Site	Discoverer(s)	Category	Diam.	Ref
348901	2006 SU_{360}	—	September 30, 2006	Mount Lemmon	Mount Lemmon Survey	EOS	1.8 km	MPC · JPL
348902	2006 SD_{365}	—	September 30, 2006	Catalina	CSS	EOS	2.1 km	MPC · JPL
348903	2006 SZ_{372}	—	September 17, 2006	Catalina	CSS	HYG	2.7 km	MPC · JPL
348904	2006 SP_{374}	—	September 16, 2006	Apache Point	A. C. Becker	·	4.2 km	MPC · JPL
348905	2006 SJ_{392}	—	September 25, 2006	Kitt Peak	Spacewatch	·	2.8 km	MPC · JPL
348906	2006 SL_{392}	—	September 25, 2006	Mount Lemmon	Mount Lemmon Survey	·	3.5 km	MPC · JPL
348907	2006 SC_{396}	—	September 17, 2006	Kitt Peak	Spacewatch	·	2.3 km	MPC · JPL
348908	2006 SA_{397}	—	September 18, 2006	Kitt Peak	Spacewatch	·	2.8 km	MPC · JPL
348909	2006 SE_{402}	—	September 18, 2006	Catalina	CSS	·	3.4 km	MPC · JPL
348910	2006 SE_{409}	—	September 30, 2006	Mount Lemmon	Mount Lemmon Survey	·	4.6 km	MPC · JPL
348911	2006 SM_{409}	—	September 19, 2006	Catalina	CSS	·	1.9 km	MPC · JPL
348912	2006 TV_{8}	—	October 11, 2006	Kitt Peak	Spacewatch	·	2.5 km	MPC · JPL
348913	2006 TJ_{9}	—	October 11, 2006	Kitt Peak	Spacewatch	·	3.4 km	MPC · JPL
348914	2006 TN_{9}	—	October 11, 2006	Kitt Peak	Spacewatch	·	3.6 km	MPC · JPL
348915	2006 TG_{12}	—	October 4, 2006	Mount Lemmon	Mount Lemmon Survey	·	3.5 km	MPC · JPL
348916	2006 TF_{13}	—	July 22, 2006	Mount Lemmon	Mount Lemmon Survey	·	1.8 km	MPC · JPL
348917	2006 TM_{19}	—	October 11, 2006	Kitt Peak	Spacewatch	·	2.6 km	MPC · JPL
348918	2006 TV_{19}	—	October 11, 2006	Kitt Peak	Spacewatch	·	2.1 km	MPC · JPL
348919	2006 TT_{21}	—	October 11, 2006	Kitt Peak	Spacewatch	·	1.7 km	MPC · JPL
348920	2006 TW_{25}	—	October 4, 2006	Catalina	CSS	·	3.1 km	MPC · JPL
348921	2006 TV_{26}	—	October 12, 2006	Kitt Peak	Spacewatch	·	660 m	MPC · JPL
348922	2006 TJ_{27}	—	October 12, 2006	Kitt Peak	Spacewatch	·	2.4 km	MPC · JPL
348923	2006 TN_{27}	—	September 25, 2006	Mount Lemmon	Mount Lemmon Survey	·	3.5 km	MPC · JPL
348924	2006 TL_{28}	—	October 12, 2006	Kitt Peak	Spacewatch	HYG	3.2 km	MPC · JPL
348925	2006 TR_{28}	—	October 12, 2006	Kitt Peak	Spacewatch	THM	2.3 km	MPC · JPL
348926	2006 TS_{37}	—	October 12, 2006	Kitt Peak	Spacewatch	·	4.1 km	MPC · JPL
348927	2006 TR_{39}	—	July 21, 2006	Mount Lemmon	Mount Lemmon Survey	·	2.4 km	MPC · JPL
348928	2006 TQ_{41}	—	October 12, 2006	Palomar	NEAT	·	4.6 km	MPC · JPL
348929	2006 TS_{42}	—	October 12, 2006	Kitt Peak	Spacewatch	·	5.6 km	MPC · JPL
348930	2006 TW_{46}	—	October 12, 2006	Kitt Peak	Spacewatch	·	3.2 km	MPC · JPL
348931	2006 TL_{55}	—	October 12, 2006	Palomar	NEAT	LIX	4.3 km	MPC · JPL
348932	2006 TD_{61}	—	October 15, 2006	Catalina	CSS	·	3.4 km	MPC · JPL
348933	2006 TR_{66}	—	October 11, 2006	Palomar	NEAT	·	3.3 km	MPC · JPL
348934	2006 TA_{67}	—	October 11, 2006	Palomar	NEAT	·	3.4 km	MPC · JPL
348935	2006 TD_{67}	—	September 28, 2006	Catalina	CSS	·	2.2 km	MPC · JPL
348936	2006 TQ_{68}	—	October 11, 2006	Palomar	NEAT	·	2.9 km	MPC · JPL
348937	2006 TE_{69}	—	October 11, 2006	Palomar	NEAT	EOS	4.4 km	MPC · JPL
348938	2006 TV_{71}	—	October 11, 2006	Palomar	NEAT	·	3.4 km	MPC · JPL
348939	2006 TT_{74}	—	October 11, 2006	Palomar	NEAT	·	3.2 km	MPC · JPL
348940	2006 TY_{75}	—	October 11, 2006	Palomar	NEAT	·	3.5 km	MPC · JPL
348941	2006 TV_{76}	—	October 11, 2006	Palomar	NEAT	·	3.2 km	MPC · JPL
348942	2006 TC_{93}	—	October 15, 2006	Kitt Peak	Spacewatch	·	3.0 km	MPC · JPL
348943	2006 TV_{93}	—	October 2, 2006	Mount Lemmon	Mount Lemmon Survey	·	2.3 km	MPC · JPL
348944	2006 TA_{94}	—	September 30, 2006	Mount Lemmon	Mount Lemmon Survey	·	3.6 km	MPC · JPL
348945	2006 TV_{96}	—	October 12, 2006	Kitt Peak	Spacewatch	·	1.1 km	MPC · JPL
348946	2006 TO_{97}	—	October 13, 2006	Kitt Peak	Spacewatch	·	1.3 km	MPC · JPL
348947	2006 TV_{101}	—	October 15, 2006	Kitt Peak	Spacewatch	KOR	1.4 km	MPC · JPL
348948	2006 TD_{105}	—	October 15, 2006	Kitt Peak	Spacewatch	THM	2.7 km	MPC · JPL
348949	2006 TY_{106}	—	October 15, 2006	Catalina	CSS	·	2.1 km	MPC · JPL
348950	2006 TT_{114}	—	October 1, 2006	Apache Point	A. C. Becker	·	3.7 km	MPC · JPL
348951	2006 TD_{119}	—	October 11, 2006	Apache Point	A. C. Becker	·	2.8 km	MPC · JPL
348952	2006 TD_{120}	—	September 28, 2006	Kitt Peak	Spacewatch	·	2.8 km	MPC · JPL
348953	2006 TY_{124}	—	October 4, 2006	Mount Lemmon	Mount Lemmon Survey	·	3.5 km	MPC · JPL
348954	2006 TE_{125}	—	October 11, 2006	Palomar	NEAT	TIR	3.5 km	MPC · JPL
348955	2006 UG	—	October 16, 2006	Desert Moon	Stevens, B. L.	JUN	3.4 km	MPC · JPL
348956	2006 UW_{6}	—	October 3, 2006	Mount Lemmon	Mount Lemmon Survey	·	3.5 km	MPC · JPL
348957	2006 US_{9}	—	October 16, 2006	Catalina	CSS	·	3.3 km	MPC · JPL
348958	2006 UO_{26}	—	October 16, 2006	Kitt Peak	Spacewatch	THM	2.6 km	MPC · JPL
348959	2006 UP_{29}	—	October 16, 2006	Kitt Peak	Spacewatch	·	1.6 km	MPC · JPL
348960	2006 UM_{31}	—	September 25, 2006	Mount Lemmon	Mount Lemmon Survey	MRX	920 m	MPC · JPL
348961	2006 UO_{37}	—	October 16, 2006	Kitt Peak	Spacewatch	VER	3.1 km	MPC · JPL
348962	2006 UM_{38}	—	October 16, 2006	Kitt Peak	Spacewatch	EOS	2.2 km	MPC · JPL
348963	2006 UQ_{46}	—	October 16, 2006	Kitt Peak	Spacewatch	KOR	1.4 km	MPC · JPL
348964	2006 UC_{49}	—	August 25, 2006	Lulin	LUSS	EOS	2.1 km	MPC · JPL
348965	2006 UF_{53}	—	October 17, 2006	Mount Lemmon	Mount Lemmon Survey	EOS	2.3 km	MPC · JPL
348966	2006 UX_{59}	—	October 19, 2006	Catalina	CSS	·	2.8 km	MPC · JPL
348967	2006 UR_{73}	—	October 17, 2006	Kitt Peak	Spacewatch	EOS	5.0 km	MPC · JPL
348968	2006 UY_{78}	—	October 17, 2006	Kitt Peak	Spacewatch	·	2.7 km	MPC · JPL
348969	2006 UT_{80}	—	October 2, 2006	Mount Lemmon	Mount Lemmon Survey	·	980 m	MPC · JPL
348970	2006 UA_{81}	—	October 17, 2006	Kitt Peak	Spacewatch	·	2.4 km	MPC · JPL
348971	2006 UH_{81}	—	October 17, 2006	Mount Lemmon	Mount Lemmon Survey	·	3.1 km	MPC · JPL
348972	2006 UJ_{94}	—	October 2, 2006	Mount Lemmon	Mount Lemmon Survey	·	3.0 km	MPC · JPL
348973	2006 UJ_{97}	—	October 18, 2006	Kitt Peak	Spacewatch	·	3.9 km	MPC · JPL
348974	2006 UV_{100}	—	October 3, 2006	Mount Lemmon	Mount Lemmon Survey	·	1.2 km	MPC · JPL
348975	2006 UG_{111}	—	October 19, 2006	Kitt Peak	Spacewatch	EOS	2.2 km	MPC · JPL
348976	2006 UJ_{116}	—	October 19, 2006	Kitt Peak	Spacewatch	·	3.2 km	MPC · JPL
348977	2006 UF_{117}	—	October 11, 2006	Kitt Peak	Spacewatch	·	3.0 km	MPC · JPL
348978	2006 UL_{117}	—	October 19, 2006	Kitt Peak	Spacewatch	·	4.4 km	MPC · JPL
348979	2006 UM_{119}	—	September 26, 2006	Mount Lemmon	Mount Lemmon Survey	·	1.4 km	MPC · JPL
348980	2006 UQ_{119}	—	October 19, 2006	Kitt Peak	Spacewatch	THM	2.1 km	MPC · JPL
348981	2006 UQ_{128}	—	October 19, 2006	Kitt Peak	Spacewatch	·	2.1 km	MPC · JPL
348982	2006 UB_{139}	—	October 19, 2006	Kitt Peak	Spacewatch	·	850 m	MPC · JPL
348983	2006 UF_{159}	—	October 21, 2006	Mount Lemmon	Mount Lemmon Survey	KOR	1.5 km	MPC · JPL
348984	2006 UK_{160}	—	October 21, 2006	Mount Lemmon	Mount Lemmon Survey	·	2.5 km	MPC · JPL
348985	2006 UM_{164}	—	October 2, 2006	Mount Lemmon	Mount Lemmon Survey	·	3.5 km	MPC · JPL
348986	2006 UK_{170}	—	October 21, 2006	Mount Lemmon	Mount Lemmon Survey	·	2.6 km	MPC · JPL
348987	2006 UY_{173}	—	October 23, 2006	Catalina	CSS	·	2.7 km	MPC · JPL
348988	2006 UB_{180}	—	October 16, 2006	Catalina	CSS	·	4.0 km	MPC · JPL
348989	2006 UB_{183}	—	October 17, 2006	Catalina	CSS	H	570 m	MPC · JPL
348990	2006 UJ_{184}	—	October 19, 2006	Catalina	CSS	·	930 m	MPC · JPL
348991	2006 UD_{185}	—	October 23, 2006	Catalina	CSS	T_{j} (2.91)	6.7 km	MPC · JPL
348992	2006 UP_{189}	—	September 17, 2006	Catalina	CSS	·	2.9 km	MPC · JPL
348993	2006 UT_{189}	—	October 19, 2006	Catalina	CSS	·	2.5 km	MPC · JPL
348994	2006 UM_{190}	—	October 19, 2006	Catalina	CSS	·	4.7 km	MPC · JPL
348995	2006 UA_{191}	—	October 19, 2006	Catalina	CSS	·	3.2 km	MPC · JPL
348996	2006 UR_{194}	—	October 20, 2006	Kitt Peak	Spacewatch	THM	2.2 km	MPC · JPL
348997	2006 UP_{197}	—	October 20, 2006	Kitt Peak	Spacewatch	·	3.2 km	MPC · JPL
348998	2006 UV_{203}	—	October 22, 2006	Palomar	NEAT	·	3.7 km	MPC · JPL
348999	2006 UR_{220}	—	October 17, 2006	Kitt Peak	Spacewatch	EOS	2.1 km	MPC · JPL
349000	2006 UU_{240}	—	October 23, 2006	Mount Lemmon	Mount Lemmon Survey	·	940 m	MPC · JPL

back to top

== See also ==
- Meanings of minor-planet names: 348001–349000
