= Jean-Claude Merlin =

French astronomer (born 1954)

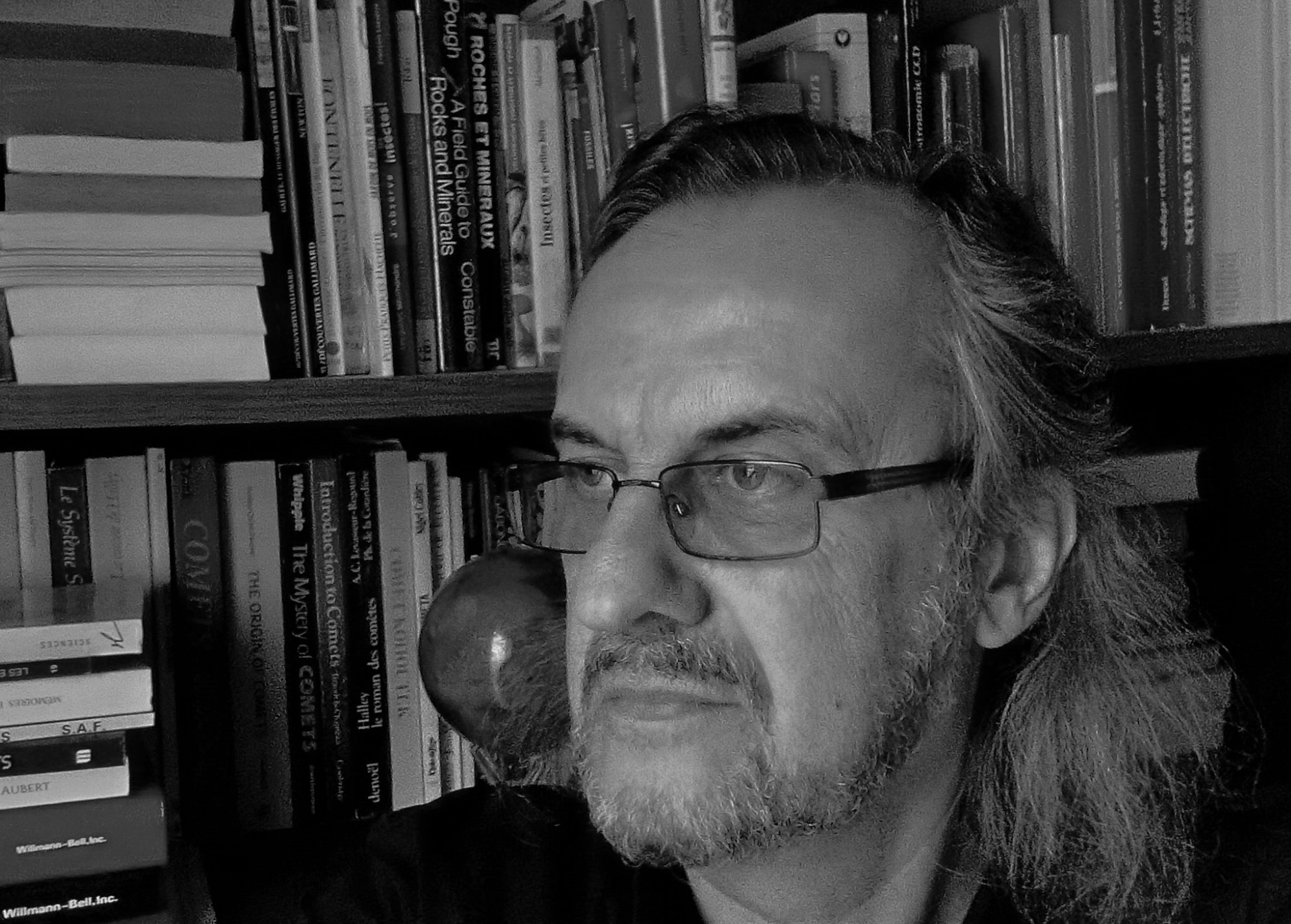
- Jean-Claude Merlin
- Born: 1954 (age 71–72)
- Awards: Lauréat de la Fondation de la Vocation 1982, Prix Georges Bidault de l'Isle 1999
- Scientific career
- Fields: Astronomy
- Institutions: Société Astronomique de Bourgogne

Minor planets discovered: 84
see § List of discovered minor planets

Jean-Claude Merlin (born 1954) is a French astronomer, founder-president of the Burgundy Astronomical Society (French: Société Astronomique de Bourgogne) and a discoverer of minor planets. He was laureate of the Marcel Bleustein-Blanchet Fondation de la Vocation in 1982 and received the Prix Georges Bidault de l'Isle of the Société astronomique de France in 1999.

The main-belt asteroid 57658 Nilrem, discovered by Michel Ory at the Jura Observatory in 2001, is named after him. Its naming citation was published on 6 March 2004 (M.P.C. 51190).

== List of discovered minor planets ==
10233 Le Creusot	December 5, 1997
15042 Anndavgui	December 14, 1998
25625 Verdenet	January 5, 2000
37044 Papymarcel	October 27, 2000
67979 Michelory	December 4, 2000
88795 Morvan	September 20, 2001
98494 Marsupilami	October 27, 2000
99262 Bleustein	July 20, 2001
110393 Rammstein	October 11, 2001
125592 Buthiers	December 15, 2001
125718 Jemasalomon	December 15, 2001
135268 Haigneré	September 20, 2001
155142 Tenagra	October 26, 2005
157747 Mandryka	February 2, 2006
158222 Manicolas	September 20, 2001
172850 Coppens	March 3, 2005
181279 Iapyx	January 22, 2006
181627 Philgeluck	December 8, 2006
184275 Laffra	January 6, 2005
184878 Gotlib	October 26, 2005
198993 Epoigny	November 20, 2005
205424 Bibracte	April 13, 2001
221230 Sanaloria	October 30, 2005
221465 Rapa Nui	January 28, 2006
224592 Carnac	December 22, 2005

224617 Micromégas	December 22, 2005
227641 Nothomb	January 28, 2006
227767 Enkibilal	October 20, 2006
229631 Cluny	March 4, 2006
231307 Peterfalk	January 28, 2006
233383 Assisneto	March 4, 2006
236463 Bretécher	March 18, 2006
243285 Fauvaud	February 11, 2008
250840 Motörhead	October 30, 2005
255308 Christianzuber	November 20, 2005
260508 Alagna	March 3, 2005
261690 Jodorowsky	December 24, 2005
262876 Davidlynch	January 21, 2007
266854 Sezenaksu	October 24, 2009
274213 Satriani	May 5, 2008
278197 Touvron	March 9, 2007
291325 de Tyard	January 29, 2006
292991 Lyonne	November 17, 2006
293499 Wolinski	April 14, 2007
308197 Satrapi	March 3, 2005
320880 Cabu	April 11, 2008
332183 Jaroussky	January 28, 2006
348034 Deslorieux	October 24, 2003
348383 Petibon	April 2, 2005
361450 Houellebecq	January 21, 2007

362316 Dogora	November 15, 2009
369423 Quintegr’al	January 28, 2006
371220 Angers	January 22, 2006
374354 Pesquet	October 30, 2005
375007 Buxy	April 14, 2007
375176 Béziau	February 28, 2008
381048 Werber	November 17, 2006
383492 Aubert	January 21, 2007
383508 Vadrot	February 9, 2007
388370 Paulblu	October 20, 2006
419435 Tiramisu	February 14, 2010
423645 Quénisset	December 22, 2005
434678 Curlin	January 22, 2006
440670 Bécassine	December 22, 2005
475080 Jarry	October 26, 2005
490628 Chassigny	January 24, 2010
547666 Morgon	March 03, 2005
548032 Ensisheim	January 17, 2010
552385 Rochechouart	December 25, 2013
555955 Lurçat	November 20, 2005
569484 Irisdement	October 26, 2005
570814 Nauru	November 18, 2006
588108 Boteropop	May 8, 2007
596543 Ubu	November 6, 2005
624448 Gennadiyborisov	30 December 2013

631202 Aquarellia	17 November 2006
642097 Kusturica	2 April 2005
643975 Lanthimos	19 September 2006
646505 Mihăileanu	28 February 2008
648709 Angissimo	24 January 2010
(649238) 2011 BK_{56}	6 November 2005
(681819) 2005 WF_{59}	20 November 2005
(682621) 2006 WD_{1}	18 November 2006
(702961) 2006 WZ	18 November 2006
(722610) 2005 WT_{64}	6 November 2005
(724513) 2008 CM_{75}	10 February 2008
(740998) 2005 ER_{246}	3 March 2005
(765735) 2013 YM_{159}	24 December 2013
(795590) 2008 JS	2 May 2008
(831735) 2009 WH_{1}	16 November 2009
(831778) 2009 WU_{99}	21 November 2009
(833331) 2010 JO_{50}	28 May 2006
(837934) 2013 WQ_{55}	21 November 2013
