= List of minor planets: 570001–571000 =

The following is a partial list of minor planets, running from minor-planet number 570001 through 571000, inclusive. The primary data for this and other partial lists is based on JPL's "Small-Body Orbital Elements" and data available from the Minor Planet Center. Critical list information is also provided by the MPC, unless otherwise specified from Lowell Observatory. A detailed description of the table's columns and additional sources are given on the main page including a complete list of every page in this series, and a statistical break-up on the dynamical classification of minor planets.

Also see the summary list of all named bodies in numerical and alphabetical order, and the corresponding naming citations for the number range of this particular list. New namings may only be added to this list after official publication, as the preannouncement of names is condemned by the Working Group for Small Bodies Nomenclature of the International Astronomical Union.

Near-Earth obj.	MBA (inner)	MBA (outer)	Centaur
Mars-crosser	MBA (middle)	Jupiter trojan	Trans-Neptunian obj.
Unclassified

== 570001–570100 ==
Designation			Discovery			Properties		Ref
Permanent	Provisional	Named after	Date	Site	Discoverer(s)	Category	Diam.	Ref
570001	2006 BE_{119}	—	January 26, 2006	Kitt Peak	Spacewatch	·	1.7 km	MPC · JPL
570002	2006 BL_{119}	—	January 26, 2006	Kitt Peak	Spacewatch	·	660 m	MPC · JPL
570003	2006 BK_{123}	—	January 26, 2006	Kitt Peak	Spacewatch	·	1.6 km	MPC · JPL
570004	2006 BM_{125}	—	January 26, 2006	Kitt Peak	Spacewatch	AGN	950 m	MPC · JPL
570005	2006 BJ_{133}	—	January 26, 2006	Kitt Peak	Spacewatch	·	780 m	MPC · JPL
570006	2006 BZ_{133}	—	January 27, 2006	Kitt Peak	Spacewatch	EUN	1.0 km	MPC · JPL
570007	2006 BB_{137}	—	November 12, 2001	Apache Point	SDSS Collaboration	·	510 m	MPC · JPL
570008	2006 BX_{151}	—	January 25, 2006	Kitt Peak	Spacewatch	·	2.3 km	MPC · JPL
570009	2006 BQ_{170}	—	January 10, 2006	Kitt Peak	Spacewatch	·	740 m	MPC · JPL
570010	2006 BQ_{173}	—	January 27, 2006	Kitt Peak	Spacewatch	·	1.9 km	MPC · JPL
570011	2006 BF_{175}	—	January 27, 2006	Kitt Peak	Spacewatch	·	1.4 km	MPC · JPL
570012	2006 BM_{178}	—	January 27, 2006	Mount Lemmon	Mount Lemmon Survey	·	1.1 km	MPC · JPL
570013	2006 BV_{192}	—	January 30, 2006	Kitt Peak	Spacewatch	·	1.3 km	MPC · JPL
570014	2006 BW_{192}	—	October 24, 2005	Mauna Kea	A. Boattini	·	1.9 km	MPC · JPL
570015	2006 BY_{195}	—	November 7, 2005	Mauna Kea	A. Boattini	·	1.8 km	MPC · JPL
570016	2006 BP_{198}	—	July 9, 2003	Kitt Peak	Spacewatch	·	1.7 km	MPC · JPL
570017	2006 BX_{198}	—	January 23, 2006	Kitt Peak	Spacewatch	PHO	950 m	MPC · JPL
570018	2006 BG_{203}	—	January 31, 2006	Kitt Peak	Spacewatch	L5	7.0 km	MPC · JPL
570019	2006 BS_{203}	—	January 31, 2006	Kitt Peak	Spacewatch	·	1.6 km	MPC · JPL
570020	2006 BZ_{203}	—	January 6, 2006	Kitt Peak	Spacewatch	AGN	1.0 km	MPC · JPL
570021	2006 BT_{204}	—	January 31, 2006	Mount Lemmon	Mount Lemmon Survey	PAD	1.3 km	MPC · JPL
570022	2006 BY_{205}	—	January 22, 2006	Mount Lemmon	Mount Lemmon Survey	·	2.9 km	MPC · JPL
570023	2006 BO_{207}	—	January 31, 2006	Mount Lemmon	Mount Lemmon Survey	HOF	2.5 km	MPC · JPL
570024	2006 BF_{211}	—	January 25, 2006	Kitt Peak	Spacewatch	L5	9.6 km	MPC · JPL
570025	2006 BD_{212}	—	January 25, 2006	Kitt Peak	Spacewatch	(2076)	740 m	MPC · JPL
570026	2006 BF_{213}	—	September 30, 2005	Mauna Kea	A. Boattini	·	2.2 km	MPC · JPL
570027	2006 BS_{215}	—	January 19, 2006	Catalina	CSS	·	1.9 km	MPC · JPL
570028	2006 BU_{218}	—	January 23, 2006	Kitt Peak	Spacewatch	·	1.7 km	MPC · JPL
570029	2006 BD_{219}	—	January 28, 2006	Mount Lemmon	Mount Lemmon Survey	·	610 m	MPC · JPL
570030	2006 BU_{220}	—	January 30, 2006	Kitt Peak	Spacewatch	·	620 m	MPC · JPL
570031	2006 BB_{222}	—	January 30, 2006	Kitt Peak	Spacewatch	·	710 m	MPC · JPL
570032	2006 BT_{230}	—	January 23, 2006	Kitt Peak	Spacewatch	·	630 m	MPC · JPL
570033	2006 BK_{233}	—	January 31, 2006	Kitt Peak	Spacewatch	·	2.6 km	MPC · JPL
570034	2006 BH_{234}	—	December 2, 2005	Kitt Peak	Wasserman, L. H., Millis, R. L.	·	1.6 km	MPC · JPL
570035	2006 BP_{240}	—	January 31, 2006	Kitt Peak	Spacewatch	V	460 m	MPC · JPL
570036	2006 BJ_{243}	—	January 31, 2006	Kitt Peak	Spacewatch	·	2.2 km	MPC · JPL
570037	2006 BQ_{244}	—	January 31, 2006	Kitt Peak	Spacewatch	HOF	2.2 km	MPC · JPL
570038	2006 BK_{246}	—	January 31, 2006	Kitt Peak	Spacewatch	·	1.3 km	MPC · JPL
570039	2006 BM_{253}	—	January 31, 2006	Kitt Peak	Spacewatch	GAL	1.6 km	MPC · JPL
570040	2006 BF_{256}	—	January 31, 2006	Kitt Peak	Spacewatch	·	670 m	MPC · JPL
570041	2006 BX_{264}	—	January 31, 2006	Kitt Peak	Spacewatch	AGN	890 m	MPC · JPL
570042	2006 BX_{277}	—	January 21, 2006	Kitt Peak	Spacewatch	H	420 m	MPC · JPL
570043	2006 BB_{281}	—	January 26, 2006	Kitt Peak	Spacewatch	·	1.9 km	MPC · JPL
570044	2006 BN_{286}	—	January 27, 2006	Mount Lemmon	Mount Lemmon Survey	·	930 m	MPC · JPL
570045	2006 BS_{286}	—	February 15, 2013	Haleakala	Pan-STARRS 1	·	640 m	MPC · JPL
570046	2006 BE_{287}	—	December 7, 2008	Mount Lemmon	Mount Lemmon Survey	·	750 m	MPC · JPL
570047	2006 BY_{287}	—	December 21, 2014	Haleakala	Pan-STARRS 1	·	1.4 km	MPC · JPL
570048	2006 BB_{288}	—	April 2, 2011	Mount Lemmon	Mount Lemmon Survey	·	1.4 km	MPC · JPL
570049	2006 BT_{288}	—	December 21, 2014	Mount Lemmon	Mount Lemmon Survey	·	1.9 km	MPC · JPL
570050	2006 BP_{289}	—	January 26, 2006	Kitt Peak	Spacewatch	·	770 m	MPC · JPL
570051	2006 BR_{290}	—	March 1, 2011	Mount Lemmon	Mount Lemmon Survey	HOF	2.1 km	MPC · JPL
570052	2006 BY_{291}	—	January 28, 2015	Haleakala	Pan-STARRS 1	HNS	830 m	MPC · JPL
570053	2006 BC_{292}	—	January 23, 2006	Kitt Peak	Spacewatch	·	960 m	MPC · JPL
570054	2006 BB_{295}	—	January 23, 2006	Kitt Peak	Spacewatch	·	1.6 km	MPC · JPL
570055	2006 BP_{295}	—	July 1, 2011	Kitt Peak	Spacewatch	L5	7.3 km	MPC · JPL
570056	2006 BN_{298}	—	January 30, 2006	Kitt Peak	Spacewatch	L5	7.3 km	MPC · JPL
570057	2006 BL_{299}	—	January 26, 2006	Kitt Peak	Spacewatch	·	1.8 km	MPC · JPL
570058	2006 BM_{299}	—	January 30, 2006	Kitt Peak	Spacewatch	DOR	1.6 km	MPC · JPL
570059	2006 BF_{300}	—	January 23, 2006	Kitt Peak	Spacewatch	L5	7.0 km	MPC · JPL
570060	2006 BT_{300}	—	January 23, 2006	Mount Lemmon	Mount Lemmon Survey	·	1.2 km	MPC · JPL
570061	2006 CA	—	January 23, 2006	Kitt Peak	Spacewatch	·	1.5 km	MPC · JPL
570062	2006 CT_{1}	—	February 1, 2006	Kitt Peak	Spacewatch	·	4.1 km	MPC · JPL
570063	2006 CS_{8}	—	July 27, 2003	Cerro Tololo	I. P. Griffin, Miranda, A.	·	1.8 km	MPC · JPL
570064	2006 CA_{12}	—	February 1, 2006	Kitt Peak	Spacewatch	·	2.3 km	MPC · JPL
570065	2006 CP_{12}	—	February 1, 2006	Kitt Peak	Spacewatch	·	1.3 km	MPC · JPL
570066	2006 CN_{13}	—	February 1, 2006	Kitt Peak	Spacewatch	·	4.0 km	MPC · JPL
570067	2006 CC_{14}	—	February 1, 2006	Kitt Peak	Spacewatch	·	1.8 km	MPC · JPL
570068	2006 CL_{21}	—	January 23, 2006	Mount Lemmon	Mount Lemmon Survey	WIT	940 m	MPC · JPL
570069	2006 CC_{25}	—	February 2, 2006	Kitt Peak	Spacewatch	·	630 m	MPC · JPL
570070	2006 CM_{29}	—	February 2, 2006	Kitt Peak	Spacewatch	L5	6.5 km	MPC · JPL
570071	2006 CC_{33}	—	February 2, 2006	Kitt Peak	Spacewatch	L5	9.1 km	MPC · JPL
570072	2006 CN_{33}	—	January 23, 2006	Mount Lemmon	Mount Lemmon Survey	·	660 m	MPC · JPL
570073	2006 CB_{34}	—	January 9, 2006	Kitt Peak	Spacewatch	L5	10 km	MPC · JPL
570074	2006 CJ_{34}	—	February 2, 2006	Mount Lemmon	Mount Lemmon Survey	·	1.4 km	MPC · JPL
570075	2006 CC_{35}	—	October 1, 1995	Kitt Peak	Spacewatch	·	1.6 km	MPC · JPL
570076	2006 CD_{36}	—	February 2, 2006	Mount Lemmon	Mount Lemmon Survey	LUT	3.8 km	MPC · JPL
570077	2006 CC_{37}	—	October 24, 2005	Mauna Kea	A. Boattini	·	1.9 km	MPC · JPL
570078	2006 CP_{38}	—	February 2, 2006	Kitt Peak	Spacewatch	·	2.3 km	MPC · JPL
570079	2006 CR_{38}	—	February 2, 2006	Kitt Peak	Spacewatch	NYS	730 m	MPC · JPL
570080	2006 CU_{38}	—	October 11, 2004	Kitt Peak	Deep Ecliptic Survey	·	1.0 km	MPC · JPL
570081	2006 CR_{52}	—	January 5, 2006	Mount Lemmon	Mount Lemmon Survey	·	470 m	MPC · JPL
570082	2006 CV_{54}	—	January 23, 2006	Mount Lemmon	Mount Lemmon Survey	·	530 m	MPC · JPL
570083	2006 CW_{54}	—	January 21, 2006	Mount Lemmon	Mount Lemmon Survey	·	1.9 km	MPC · JPL
570084	2006 CC_{55}	—	February 4, 2006	Mount Lemmon	Mount Lemmon Survey	·	920 m	MPC · JPL
570085	2006 CB_{56}	—	February 4, 2006	Mount Lemmon	Mount Lemmon Survey	·	1.3 km	MPC · JPL
570086	2006 CK_{57}	—	February 4, 2006	Kitt Peak	Spacewatch	HNS	1.0 km	MPC · JPL
570087	2006 CZ_{64}	—	February 2, 2006	Mauna Kea	P. A. Wiegert	·	650 m	MPC · JPL
570088	2006 CY_{65}	—	February 6, 2006	Kitt Peak	Spacewatch	·	1.2 km	MPC · JPL
570089	2006 CG_{68}	—	February 4, 2006	Kitt Peak	Spacewatch	·	790 m	MPC · JPL
570090	2006 CG_{69}	—	January 27, 2006	Mount Lemmon	Mount Lemmon Survey	L5	7.5 km	MPC · JPL
570091	2006 CM_{73}	—	March 29, 2011	Mount Lemmon	Mount Lemmon Survey	MRX	820 m	MPC · JPL
570092	2006 CE_{74}	—	April 3, 2011	Haleakala	Pan-STARRS 1	·	1.2 km	MPC · JPL
570093	2006 CR_{81}	—	November 16, 2009	Mount Lemmon	Mount Lemmon Survey	·	1.7 km	MPC · JPL
570094	2006 CL_{82}	—	February 1, 2006	Kitt Peak	Spacewatch	·	2.1 km	MPC · JPL
570095	2006 CN_{82}	—	December 28, 2011	Kitt Peak	Spacewatch	·	2.6 km	MPC · JPL
570096	2006 CO_{82}	—	February 1, 2006	Kitt Peak	Spacewatch	HNS	930 m	MPC · JPL
570097	2006 CZ_{83}	—	January 28, 2014	Kitt Peak	Spacewatch	·	1.4 km	MPC · JPL
570098	2006 CC_{84}	—	January 27, 2011	Mount Lemmon	Mount Lemmon Survey	·	2.9 km	MPC · JPL
570099	2006 CG_{84}	—	June 29, 2014	Haleakala	Pan-STARRS 1	V	510 m	MPC · JPL
570100	2006 CD_{85}	—	November 20, 2009	Mount Lemmon	Mount Lemmon Survey	·	860 m	MPC · JPL

== 570101–570200 ==
back to top

Designation			Discovery			Properties		Ref
Permanent	Provisional	Named after	Date	Site	Discoverer(s)	Category	Diam.	Ref
570101	2006 CQ_{85}	—	December 3, 2008	Mount Lemmon	Mount Lemmon Survey	·	550 m	MPC · JPL
570102	2006 CS_{85}	—	September 13, 2007	Mount Lemmon	Mount Lemmon Survey	(2076)	780 m	MPC · JPL
570103	2006 DY_{11}	—	February 20, 2006	Kitt Peak	Spacewatch	(5)	1.2 km	MPC · JPL
570104	2006 DN_{15}	—	January 23, 2006	Kitt Peak	Spacewatch	·	1.0 km	MPC · JPL
570105	2006 DT_{18}	—	January 23, 2006	Kitt Peak	Spacewatch	·	1.3 km	MPC · JPL
570106	2006 DA_{20}	—	February 20, 2006	Kitt Peak	Spacewatch	·	1.3 km	MPC · JPL
570107	2006 DJ_{21}	—	January 23, 2006	Mount Lemmon	Mount Lemmon Survey	·	1.6 km	MPC · JPL
570108	2006 DH_{49}	—	January 30, 2006	Kitt Peak	Spacewatch	·	1.9 km	MPC · JPL
570109	2006 DN_{52}	—	February 24, 2006	Kitt Peak	Spacewatch	·	3.7 km	MPC · JPL
570110	2006 DY_{56}	—	February 24, 2006	Palomar	NEAT	·	1.2 km	MPC · JPL
570111	2006 DK_{59}	—	February 24, 2006	Mount Lemmon	Mount Lemmon Survey	HOF	2.6 km	MPC · JPL
570112	2006 DS_{60}	—	February 24, 2006	Kitt Peak	Spacewatch	·	720 m	MPC · JPL
570113	2006 DH_{61}	—	February 24, 2006	Kitt Peak	Spacewatch	·	1.2 km	MPC · JPL
570114	2006 DO_{77}	—	February 24, 2006	Kitt Peak	Spacewatch	·	950 m	MPC · JPL
570115	2006 DL_{78}	—	January 30, 2006	Kitt Peak	Spacewatch	L5	7.8 km	MPC · JPL
570116	2006 DG_{81}	—	March 24, 2001	Kitt Peak	M. W. Buie, Kern, S.	·	1.6 km	MPC · JPL
570117	2006 DV_{82}	—	January 30, 2006	Flagstaff	Wasserman, L. H.	·	2.3 km	MPC · JPL
570118	2006 DA_{86}	—	February 24, 2006	Kitt Peak	Spacewatch	·	1.3 km	MPC · JPL
570119	2006 DK_{86}	—	September 11, 2004	Kitt Peak	Spacewatch	·	1.6 km	MPC · JPL
570120	2006 DC_{92}	—	September 30, 2003	Kitt Peak	Spacewatch	·	2.1 km	MPC · JPL
570121	2006 DF_{92}	—	February 24, 2006	Kitt Peak	Spacewatch	·	1.3 km	MPC · JPL
570122	2006 DQ_{100}	—	April 25, 2003	Kitt Peak	Spacewatch	·	590 m	MPC · JPL
570123	2006 DL_{102}	—	February 25, 2006	Mount Lemmon	Mount Lemmon Survey	·	810 m	MPC · JPL
570124	2006 DQ_{104}	—	February 25, 2006	Kitt Peak	Spacewatch	·	710 m	MPC · JPL
570125	2006 DS_{104}	—	February 25, 2006	Kitt Peak	Spacewatch	·	1.8 km	MPC · JPL
570126	2006 DH_{106}	—	February 25, 2006	Mount Lemmon	Mount Lemmon Survey	·	1.3 km	MPC · JPL
570127	2006 DG_{111}	—	October 31, 2005	Kitt Peak	Spacewatch	·	2.3 km	MPC · JPL
570128	2006 DV_{111}	—	January 26, 2006	Kitt Peak	Spacewatch	·	1.0 km	MPC · JPL
570129	2006 DV_{112}	—	April 11, 1999	Kitt Peak	Spacewatch	·	840 m	MPC · JPL
570130	2006 DN_{114}	—	February 9, 2006	Palomar	NEAT	EUP	3.3 km	MPC · JPL
570131	2006 DH_{128}	—	February 25, 2006	Mount Lemmon	Mount Lemmon Survey	·	2.1 km	MPC · JPL
570132	2006 DH_{129}	—	February 25, 2006	Kitt Peak	Spacewatch	·	2.2 km	MPC · JPL
570133	2006 DQ_{129}	—	February 25, 2006	Kitt Peak	Spacewatch	·	1.8 km	MPC · JPL
570134	2006 DN_{139}	—	February 25, 2006	Kitt Peak	Spacewatch	L5	7.2 km	MPC · JPL
570135	2006 DR_{142}	—	February 25, 2006	Kitt Peak	Spacewatch	·	1.6 km	MPC · JPL
570136	2006 DN_{147}	—	February 25, 2006	Mount Lemmon	Mount Lemmon Survey	·	1.4 km	MPC · JPL
570137	2006 DQ_{149}	—	February 25, 2006	Kitt Peak	Spacewatch	HOF	2.5 km	MPC · JPL
570138	2006 DW_{152}	—	February 25, 2006	Kitt Peak	Spacewatch	·	790 m	MPC · JPL
570139	2006 DQ_{154}	—	February 25, 2006	Kitt Peak	Spacewatch	EUN	800 m	MPC · JPL
570140	2006 DY_{155}	—	January 22, 2006	Mount Lemmon	Mount Lemmon Survey	JUN	910 m	MPC · JPL
570141	2006 DM_{160}	—	February 7, 2006	Mount Lemmon	Mount Lemmon Survey	(5)	1.0 km	MPC · JPL
570142	2006 DT_{160}	—	February 27, 2006	Kitt Peak	Spacewatch	EUN	990 m	MPC · JPL
570143	2006 DB_{162}	—	February 27, 2006	Mount Lemmon	Mount Lemmon Survey	WIT	770 m	MPC · JPL
570144	2006 DT_{164}	—	February 27, 2006	Kitt Peak	Spacewatch	·	1.7 km	MPC · JPL
570145	2006 DV_{166}	—	December 3, 2005	Mauna Kea	A. Boattini	·	1.8 km	MPC · JPL
570146	2006 DK_{171}	—	February 27, 2006	Kitt Peak	Spacewatch	HOF	2.2 km	MPC · JPL
570147	2006 DR_{175}	—	October 7, 2004	Kitt Peak	Spacewatch	V	570 m	MPC · JPL
570148	2006 DW_{175}	—	February 27, 2006	Mount Lemmon	Mount Lemmon Survey	·	1.4 km	MPC · JPL
570149	2006 DM_{176}	—	February 27, 2006	Mount Lemmon	Mount Lemmon Survey	·	1.7 km	MPC · JPL
570150	2006 DV_{177}	—	October 12, 1999	Kitt Peak	Spacewatch	MAR	870 m	MPC · JPL
570151	2006 DZ_{179}	—	February 27, 2006	Mount Lemmon	Mount Lemmon Survey	·	1.1 km	MPC · JPL
570152	2006 DG_{181}	—	February 27, 2006	Kitt Peak	Spacewatch	·	1.4 km	MPC · JPL
570153	2006 DU_{186}	—	February 27, 2006	Kitt Peak	Spacewatch	·	1.8 km	MPC · JPL
570154	2006 DX_{187}	—	September 18, 1999	Kitt Peak	Spacewatch	·	2.0 km	MPC · JPL
570155	2006 DV_{194}	—	February 2, 2006	Kitt Peak	Spacewatch	·	840 m	MPC · JPL
570156	2006 DK_{204}	—	February 25, 2006	Catalina	CSS	·	2.1 km	MPC · JPL
570157	2006 DA_{205}	—	February 25, 2006	Mount Lemmon	Mount Lemmon Survey	·	2.5 km	MPC · JPL
570158	2006 DV_{209}	—	February 28, 2006	Mount Lemmon	Mount Lemmon Survey	·	1.9 km	MPC · JPL
570159	2006 DZ_{211}	—	February 25, 2006	Kitt Peak	Spacewatch	NYS	720 m	MPC · JPL
570160	2006 DA_{213}	—	February 24, 2006	Kitt Peak	Spacewatch	·	1.0 km	MPC · JPL
570161	2006 DK_{215}	—	February 27, 2006	Kitt Peak	Spacewatch	·	800 m	MPC · JPL
570162	2006 DN_{218}	—	February 20, 2006	Kitt Peak	Spacewatch	EOS	1.8 km	MPC · JPL
570163	2006 DJ_{221}	—	February 25, 2006	Kitt Peak	Spacewatch	·	2.4 km	MPC · JPL
570164	2006 DK_{221}	—	February 24, 2006	Kitt Peak	Spacewatch	·	1.1 km	MPC · JPL
570165	2006 DX_{221}	—	February 27, 2006	Kitt Peak	Spacewatch	HNS	1.1 km	MPC · JPL
570166	2006 DY_{221}	—	February 27, 2006	Mount Lemmon	Mount Lemmon Survey	·	1.5 km	MPC · JPL
570167	2006 DE_{223}	—	September 24, 2012	Mount Lemmon	Mount Lemmon Survey	L5	7.5 km	MPC · JPL
570168	2006 DC_{225}	—	February 24, 2006	Mount Lemmon	Mount Lemmon Survey	·	3.5 km	MPC · JPL
570169	2006 DG_{225}	—	February 27, 2006	Kitt Peak	Spacewatch	·	1.5 km	MPC · JPL
570170	2006 DJ_{225}	—	February 27, 2006	Kitt Peak	Spacewatch	·	730 m	MPC · JPL
570171	2006 ER_{6}	—	March 2, 2006	Kitt Peak	Spacewatch	·	3.0 km	MPC · JPL
570172	2006 EA_{8}	—	March 2, 2006	Kitt Peak	Spacewatch	·	2.0 km	MPC · JPL
570173	2006 EQ_{9}	—	March 2, 2006	Kitt Peak	Spacewatch	·	1.8 km	MPC · JPL
570174	2006 EK_{10}	—	March 2, 2006	Kitt Peak	Spacewatch	·	570 m	MPC · JPL
570175	2006 EB_{19}	—	March 2, 2006	Mount Lemmon	Mount Lemmon Survey	·	2.1 km	MPC · JPL
570176	2006 EF_{22}	—	January 31, 2006	Kitt Peak	Spacewatch	·	1.4 km	MPC · JPL
570177	2006 EG_{24}	—	March 3, 2006	Kitt Peak	Spacewatch	HOF	2.2 km	MPC · JPL
570178	2006 EU_{24}	—	March 3, 2006	Kitt Peak	Spacewatch	·	1.7 km	MPC · JPL
570179	2006 EY_{24}	—	February 20, 2006	Kitt Peak	Spacewatch	·	1.8 km	MPC · JPL
570180	2006 EF_{26}	—	March 3, 2006	Kitt Peak	Spacewatch	·	2.5 km	MPC · JPL
570181	2006 EY_{30}	—	March 3, 2006	Kitt Peak	Spacewatch	·	2.0 km	MPC · JPL
570182	2006 EC_{33}	—	December 3, 2005	Mauna Kea	A. Boattini	·	2.9 km	MPC · JPL
570183	2006 EZ_{36}	—	December 3, 2005	Mauna Kea	A. Boattini	·	1.9 km	MPC · JPL
570184	2006 EC_{38}	—	March 4, 2006	Mount Lemmon	Mount Lemmon Survey	·	1.7 km	MPC · JPL
570185	2006 EY_{39}	—	February 24, 2006	Kitt Peak	Spacewatch	·	960 m	MPC · JPL
570186	2006 ED_{42}	—	March 4, 2006	Kitt Peak	Spacewatch	·	1.8 km	MPC · JPL
570187	2006 EY_{43}	—	October 29, 2008	Kitt Peak	Spacewatch	·	780 m	MPC · JPL
570188	2006 ET_{46}	—	March 4, 2006	Kitt Peak	Spacewatch	·	1.9 km	MPC · JPL
570189	2006 EN_{49}	—	March 4, 2006	Kitt Peak	Spacewatch	·	1.3 km	MPC · JPL
570190	2006 EA_{50}	—	March 4, 2006	Kitt Peak	Spacewatch	·	1.6 km	MPC · JPL
570191	2006 EQ_{61}	—	March 5, 2006	Kitt Peak	Spacewatch	·	2.2 km	MPC · JPL
570192	2006 EY_{66}	—	February 27, 2006	Mount Lemmon	Mount Lemmon Survey	·	1.4 km	MPC · JPL
570193	2006 EO_{68}	—	March 3, 2006	Kitt Peak	Spacewatch	·	1.6 km	MPC · JPL
570194	2006 EL_{76}	—	October 10, 2008	Mount Lemmon	Mount Lemmon Survey	·	1.9 km	MPC · JPL
570195	2006 EQ_{76}	—	April 27, 2011	Mount Lemmon	Mount Lemmon Survey	EUN	1.1 km	MPC · JPL
570196	2006 EV_{76}	—	October 6, 2004	Kitt Peak	Spacewatch	·	1.4 km	MPC · JPL
570197	2006 EV_{77}	—	March 2, 2006	Kitt Peak	Spacewatch	·	1.5 km	MPC · JPL
570198	2006 ET_{80}	—	January 18, 2015	Haleakala	Pan-STARRS 1	ADE	1.5 km	MPC · JPL
570199	2006 EK_{81}	—	March 4, 2006	Kitt Peak	Spacewatch	PAD	1.3 km	MPC · JPL
570200	2006 ES_{81}	—	March 4, 2006	Kitt Peak	Spacewatch	PHO	650 m	MPC · JPL

== 570201–570300 ==
back to top

Designation			Discovery			Properties		Ref
Permanent	Provisional	Named after	Date	Site	Discoverer(s)	Category	Diam.	Ref
570201	2006 EU_{81}	—	March 8, 2006	Mount Lemmon	Mount Lemmon Survey	·	680 m	MPC · JPL
570202	2006 FX_{15}	—	March 2, 2006	Kitt Peak	Spacewatch	·	700 m	MPC · JPL
570203	2006 FM_{24}	—	March 24, 2006	Kitt Peak	Spacewatch	·	1.2 km	MPC · JPL
570204	2006 FM_{29}	—	March 24, 2006	Kitt Peak	Spacewatch	·	1.0 km	MPC · JPL
570205	2006 FQ_{30}	—	March 25, 2006	Kitt Peak	Spacewatch	NYS	930 m	MPC · JPL
570206	2006 FV_{31}	—	March 25, 2006	Kitt Peak	Spacewatch	H	330 m	MPC · JPL
570207	2006 FO_{47}	—	April 2, 2006	Catalina	CSS	GEF	1.5 km	MPC · JPL
570208	2006 FC_{55}	—	April 1, 2011	Kitt Peak	Spacewatch	GAL	1.4 km	MPC · JPL
570209	2006 FU_{55}	—	October 24, 2008	Kitt Peak	Spacewatch	·	1.9 km	MPC · JPL
570210	2006 FA_{56}	—	March 5, 2006	Kitt Peak	Spacewatch	GEF	1.1 km	MPC · JPL
570211	2006 FU_{56}	—	March 26, 2006	Kitt Peak	Spacewatch	·	570 m	MPC · JPL
570212	2006 FX_{57}	—	March 26, 2006	Mount Lemmon	Mount Lemmon Survey	·	1.2 km	MPC · JPL
570213	2006 FN_{58}	—	March 23, 2006	Kitt Peak	Spacewatch	·	1.5 km	MPC · JPL
570214	2006 FS_{58}	—	March 26, 2006	Mount Lemmon	Mount Lemmon Survey	·	1.7 km	MPC · JPL
570215	2006 FV_{58}	—	March 24, 2006	Mount Lemmon	Mount Lemmon Survey	·	810 m	MPC · JPL
570216	2006 FR_{59}	—	February 19, 2014	Mount Lemmon	Mount Lemmon Survey	·	1.1 km	MPC · JPL
570217	2006 FN_{60}	—	March 26, 2006	Mount Lemmon	Mount Lemmon Survey	·	790 m	MPC · JPL
570218	2006 FR_{60}	—	March 25, 2006	Kitt Peak	Spacewatch	·	1.8 km	MPC · JPL
570219	2006 FS_{60}	—	March 25, 2006	Kitt Peak	Spacewatch	·	1.6 km	MPC · JPL
570220	2006 GJ_{3}	—	April 7, 2006	Wrightwood	J. W. Young	·	1.8 km	MPC · JPL
570221	2006 GB_{7}	—	April 2, 2006	Kitt Peak	Spacewatch	HOF	2.6 km	MPC · JPL
570222	2006 GE_{8}	—	February 24, 2006	Kitt Peak	Spacewatch	PHO	670 m	MPC · JPL
570223	2006 GS_{11}	—	April 2, 2006	Kitt Peak	Spacewatch	·	1.8 km	MPC · JPL
570224	2006 GC_{30}	—	April 2, 2006	Mount Lemmon	Mount Lemmon Survey	V	510 m	MPC · JPL
570225	2006 GO_{33}	—	March 2, 2006	Kitt Peak	Spacewatch	MAS	530 m	MPC · JPL
570226	2006 GO_{44}	—	April 2, 2006	Mount Lemmon	Mount Lemmon Survey	·	2.3 km	MPC · JPL
570227	2006 GH_{45}	—	April 7, 2006	Junk Bond	D. Healy	·	1.7 km	MPC · JPL
570228	2006 GU_{55}	—	April 9, 2006	Mount Lemmon	Mount Lemmon Survey	H	510 m	MPC · JPL
570229	2006 GY_{55}	—	August 20, 2014	Haleakala	Pan-STARRS 1	·	660 m	MPC · JPL
570230	2006 GD_{57}	—	April 2, 2006	Mount Lemmon	Mount Lemmon Survey	·	1.5 km	MPC · JPL
570231	2006 GE_{57}	—	November 6, 2012	Mount Lemmon	Mount Lemmon Survey	·	1.4 km	MPC · JPL
570232	2006 GX_{58}	—	April 7, 2006	Kitt Peak	Spacewatch	·	3.3 km	MPC · JPL
570233	2006 HN_{12}	—	March 3, 2006	Kitt Peak	Spacewatch	·	1.5 km	MPC · JPL
570234	2006 HS_{16}	—	April 19, 2006	Kitt Peak	Spacewatch	·	4.2 km	MPC · JPL
570235	2006 HY_{19}	—	March 25, 2006	Kitt Peak	Spacewatch	·	2.0 km	MPC · JPL
570236	2006 HL_{36}	—	April 7, 2006	Kitt Peak	Spacewatch	·	940 m	MPC · JPL
570237	2006 HM_{38}	—	April 21, 2006	Kitt Peak	Spacewatch	·	1.9 km	MPC · JPL
570238	2006 HM_{49}	—	April 25, 2006	Kitt Peak	Spacewatch	MAS	660 m	MPC · JPL
570239	2006 HP_{61}	—	April 7, 2006	Kitt Peak	Spacewatch	·	1.7 km	MPC · JPL
570240	2006 HH_{62}	—	April 24, 2006	Kitt Peak	Spacewatch	AGN	990 m	MPC · JPL
570241	2006 HU_{66}	—	April 24, 2006	Kitt Peak	Spacewatch	·	1.8 km	MPC · JPL
570242	2006 HN_{74}	—	April 25, 2006	Kitt Peak	Spacewatch	·	2.1 km	MPC · JPL
570243	2006 HS_{74}	—	April 25, 2006	Kitt Peak	Spacewatch	·	930 m	MPC · JPL
570244	2006 HA_{76}	—	April 25, 2006	Kitt Peak	Spacewatch	·	1.2 km	MPC · JPL
570245	2006 HC_{86}	—	April 27, 2006	Kitt Peak	Spacewatch	·	1.8 km	MPC · JPL
570246	2006 HT_{90}	—	April 28, 2006	Socorro	LINEAR	PHO	1.0 km	MPC · JPL
570247	2006 HJ_{93}	—	April 29, 2006	Kitt Peak	Spacewatch	·	2.1 km	MPC · JPL
570248	2006 HB_{94}	—	April 29, 2006	Kitt Peak	Spacewatch	·	1.6 km	MPC · JPL
570249	2006 HG_{98}	—	April 7, 2006	Kitt Peak	Spacewatch	·	850 m	MPC · JPL
570250	2006 HZ_{100}	—	April 30, 2006	Kitt Peak	Spacewatch	·	1.9 km	MPC · JPL
570251	2006 HX_{103}	—	April 30, 2006	Kitt Peak	Spacewatch	(194)	1.6 km	MPC · JPL
570252	2006 HJ_{108}	—	April 30, 2006	Kitt Peak	Spacewatch	·	560 m	MPC · JPL
570253	2006 HJ_{109}	—	April 29, 2006	Kitt Peak	Spacewatch	·	2.0 km	MPC · JPL
570254	2006 HP_{112}	—	March 26, 2006	Mount Lemmon	Mount Lemmon Survey	MAS	590 m	MPC · JPL
570255	2006 HW_{115}	—	April 26, 2006	Mount Lemmon	Mount Lemmon Survey	615	1.3 km	MPC · JPL
570256	2006 HN_{116}	—	April 26, 2006	Kitt Peak	Spacewatch	·	1.9 km	MPC · JPL
570257	2006 HU_{116}	—	September 21, 2003	Kitt Peak	Spacewatch	·	1.1 km	MPC · JPL
570258	2006 HN_{123}	—	October 18, 2003	Kitt Peak	Spacewatch	KOR	1.2 km	MPC · JPL
570259	2006 HD_{124}	—	May 2, 2006	Mount Lemmon	Mount Lemmon Survey	V	440 m	MPC · JPL
570260	2006 HG_{125}	—	April 30, 2006	Kitt Peak	Spacewatch	·	1.6 km	MPC · JPL
570261	2006 HW_{131}	—	April 26, 2006	Cerro Tololo	Deep Ecliptic Survey	WIT	800 m	MPC · JPL
570262	2006 HV_{139}	—	April 26, 2006	Cerro Tololo	Deep Ecliptic Survey	·	760 m	MPC · JPL
570263	2006 HE_{141}	—	January 30, 2006	Kitt Peak	Spacewatch	·	1.4 km	MPC · JPL
570264	2006 HH_{141}	—	January 31, 2006	Kitt Peak	Spacewatch	·	1.5 km	MPC · JPL
570265	2006 HQ_{144}	—	April 27, 2006	Cerro Tololo	Deep Ecliptic Survey	·	860 m	MPC · JPL
570266	2006 HN_{146}	—	May 2, 2006	Mount Lemmon	Mount Lemmon Survey	·	780 m	MPC · JPL
570267	2006 HE_{156}	—	April 29, 2006	Kitt Peak	Spacewatch	·	400 m	MPC · JPL
570268	2006 HM_{157}	—	December 7, 2015	Haleakala	Pan-STARRS 1	H	420 m	MPC · JPL
570269	2006 HC_{159}	—	October 17, 2012	Haleakala	Pan-STARRS 1	·	1.1 km	MPC · JPL
570270	2006 JH_{3}	—	October 16, 2003	Kitt Peak	Spacewatch	·	1.9 km	MPC · JPL
570271	2006 JF_{7}	—	May 1, 2006	Kitt Peak	Spacewatch	·	1.9 km	MPC · JPL
570272	2006 JQ_{9}	—	March 26, 2003	Apache Point	SDSS	H	340 m	MPC · JPL
570273	2006 JA_{19}	—	May 2, 2006	Mount Lemmon	Mount Lemmon Survey	BRA	1.4 km	MPC · JPL
570274	2006 JF_{41}	—	May 7, 2006	Mount Lemmon	Mount Lemmon Survey	(12739)	1.5 km	MPC · JPL
570275	2006 JK_{45}	—	April 21, 2006	Kitt Peak	Spacewatch	·	950 m	MPC · JPL
570276	2006 JX_{51}	—	May 3, 2006	Mount Lemmon	Mount Lemmon Survey	·	900 m	MPC · JPL
570277	2006 JM_{55}	—	April 7, 2006	Anderson Mesa	LONEOS	·	2.7 km	MPC · JPL
570278	2006 JL_{62}	—	January 5, 2006	Mount Lemmon	Mount Lemmon Survey	L5	7.8 km	MPC · JPL
570279	2006 JP_{65}	—	May 1, 2006	Kitt Peak	Deep Ecliptic Survey	·	1.2 km	MPC · JPL
570280	2006 JS_{78}	—	May 1, 2006	Mauna Kea	P. A. Wiegert	KOR	1.1 km	MPC · JPL
570281	2006 JS_{82}	—	January 31, 2009	Kitt Peak	Spacewatch	MAS	660 m	MPC · JPL
570282	2006 JH_{83}	—	October 17, 2012	Haleakala	Pan-STARRS 1	·	1.3 km	MPC · JPL
570283	2006 JP_{83}	—	February 23, 2015	Haleakala	Pan-STARRS 1	·	2.0 km	MPC · JPL
570284	2006 JT_{83}	—	September 6, 2013	Mount Lemmon	Mount Lemmon Survey	·	420 m	MPC · JPL
570285	2006 JU_{83}	—	July 30, 2008	Kitt Peak	Spacewatch	·	1.4 km	MPC · JPL
570286	2006 JX_{83}	—	March 19, 2013	Palomar	Palomar Transient Factory	·	900 m	MPC · JPL
570287	2006 JV_{84}	—	May 2, 2006	Mount Lemmon	Mount Lemmon Survey	EUN	1.2 km	MPC · JPL
570288	2006 JS_{85}	—	October 10, 2007	Kitt Peak	Spacewatch	JUN	650 m	MPC · JPL
570289	2006 JU_{85}	—	January 25, 2009	Kitt Peak	Spacewatch	·	480 m	MPC · JPL
570290	2006 JX_{85}	—	May 8, 2006	Kitt Peak	Spacewatch	·	980 m	MPC · JPL
570291	2006 JZ_{86}	—	September 21, 2012	Mount Lemmon	Mount Lemmon Survey	·	1.6 km	MPC · JPL
570292	2006 JV_{87}	—	August 26, 2012	Haleakala	Pan-STARRS 1	HOF	2.1 km	MPC · JPL
570293	2006 JX_{87}	—	February 16, 2015	Haleakala	Pan-STARRS 1	·	1.8 km	MPC · JPL
570294	2006 JS_{88}	—	May 5, 2006	Kitt Peak	Spacewatch	·	560 m	MPC · JPL
570295	2006 KJ_{8}	—	February 16, 2005	La Silla	A. Boattini	AGN	1.3 km	MPC · JPL
570296	2006 KT_{16}	—	February 14, 2005	Kitt Peak	Spacewatch	·	1.9 km	MPC · JPL
570297	2006 KA_{21}	—	May 20, 2006	Kitt Peak	Spacewatch	·	1.9 km	MPC · JPL
570298	2006 KD_{23}	—	May 22, 2006	Kitt Peak	Spacewatch	H	390 m	MPC · JPL
570299	2006 KS_{35}	—	May 20, 2006	Kitt Peak	Spacewatch	PHO	810 m	MPC · JPL
570300	2006 KQ_{36}	—	May 21, 2006	Kitt Peak	Spacewatch	·	710 m	MPC · JPL

== 570301–570400 ==
back to top

Designation			Discovery			Properties		Ref
Permanent	Provisional	Named after	Date	Site	Discoverer(s)	Category	Diam.	Ref
570301	2006 KG_{40}	—	May 18, 2006	Palomar	NEAT	PHO	1 km	MPC · JPL
570302	2006 KJ_{45}	—	May 21, 2006	Kitt Peak	Spacewatch	·	1 km	MPC · JPL
570303	2006 KR_{46}	—	May 21, 2006	Mount Lemmon	Mount Lemmon Survey	·	1.8 km	MPC · JPL
570304	2006 KV_{46}	—	May 21, 2006	Kitt Peak	Spacewatch	·	1.5 km	MPC · JPL
570305	2006 KW_{46}	—	May 21, 2006	Mount Lemmon	Mount Lemmon Survey	GEF	1.4 km	MPC · JPL
570306	2006 KX_{47}	—	May 21, 2006	Kitt Peak	Spacewatch	·	1.4 km	MPC · JPL
570307	2006 KF_{48}	—	May 8, 2006	Kitt Peak	Spacewatch	AGN	1.2 km	MPC · JPL
570308	2006 KJ_{55}	—	May 21, 2006	Kitt Peak	Spacewatch	·	1.8 km	MPC · JPL
570309	2006 KZ_{57}	—	May 22, 2006	Kitt Peak	Spacewatch	·	1.7 km	MPC · JPL
570310	2006 KV_{59}	—	May 22, 2006	Kitt Peak	Spacewatch	·	880 m	MPC · JPL
570311	2006 KS_{61}	—	May 22, 2006	Kitt Peak	Spacewatch	·	1.9 km	MPC · JPL
570312	2006 KU_{66}	—	May 24, 2006	Kitt Peak	Spacewatch	·	820 m	MPC · JPL
570313	2006 KZ_{69}	—	May 22, 2006	Kitt Peak	Spacewatch	·	1.3 km	MPC · JPL
570314	2006 KF_{70}	—	May 22, 2006	Kitt Peak	Spacewatch	·	1.9 km	MPC · JPL
570315	2006 KT_{73}	—	May 9, 2006	Mount Lemmon	Mount Lemmon Survey	·	1.4 km	MPC · JPL
570316	2006 KP_{77}	—	September 30, 2003	Kitt Peak	Spacewatch	V	590 m	MPC · JPL
570317	2006 KX_{77}	—	May 24, 2006	Mount Lemmon	Mount Lemmon Survey	·	560 m	MPC · JPL
570318	2006 KL_{78}	—	May 6, 2006	Mount Lemmon	Mount Lemmon Survey	·	1.2 km	MPC · JPL
570319	2006 KD_{82}	—	May 25, 2006	Mount Lemmon	Mount Lemmon Survey	·	1.1 km	MPC · JPL
570320	2006 KR_{82}	—	May 8, 2006	Mount Lemmon	Mount Lemmon Survey	·	2.8 km	MPC · JPL
570321	2006 KD_{83}	—	April 20, 2006	Mount Lemmon	Mount Lemmon Survey	MAS	580 m	MPC · JPL
570322	2006 KA_{84}	—	May 21, 2006	Kitt Peak	Spacewatch	H	410 m	MPC · JPL
570323	2006 KZ_{88}	—	May 26, 2006	Mount Lemmon	Mount Lemmon Survey	·	1.2 km	MPC · JPL
570324	2006 KE_{90}	—	May 23, 2006	Kitt Peak	Spacewatch	·	2.7 km	MPC · JPL
570325	2006 KF_{94}	—	May 25, 2006	Kitt Peak	Spacewatch	·	810 m	MPC · JPL
570326	2006 KU_{98}	—	May 26, 2006	Kitt Peak	Spacewatch	·	1.5 km	MPC · JPL
570327	2006 KM_{105}	—	March 25, 2006	Kitt Peak	Spacewatch	·	1.5 km	MPC · JPL
570328	2006 KH_{109}	—	May 3, 2006	Mount Lemmon	Mount Lemmon Survey	·	980 m	MPC · JPL
570329	2006 KG_{110}	—	May 31, 2006	Mount Lemmon	Mount Lemmon Survey	DOR	2.3 km	MPC · JPL
570330	2006 KJ_{115}	—	May 4, 2006	Kitt Peak	Spacewatch	·	1.7 km	MPC · JPL
570331	2006 KX_{115}	—	May 29, 2006	Kitt Peak	Spacewatch	·	1.9 km	MPC · JPL
570332	2006 KP_{117}	—	April 7, 2006	Kitt Peak	Spacewatch	NYS	910 m	MPC · JPL
570333	2006 KN_{119}	—	May 31, 2006	Kitt Peak	Spacewatch	·	2.0 km	MPC · JPL
570334	2006 KP_{119}	—	May 23, 2006	Kitt Peak	Spacewatch	·	1.4 km	MPC · JPL
570335	2006 KN_{120}	—	May 9, 2006	Mount Lemmon	Mount Lemmon Survey	·	2.1 km	MPC · JPL
570336	2006 KZ_{121}	—	May 19, 2006	Mount Lemmon	Mount Lemmon Survey	·	2.1 km	MPC · JPL
570337	2006 KQ_{131}	—	May 25, 2006	Mauna Kea	P. A. Wiegert	·	1.3 km	MPC · JPL
570338	2006 KD_{134}	—	May 25, 2006	Mauna Kea	P. A. Wiegert	·	1.6 km	MPC · JPL
570339	2006 KD_{138}	—	May 25, 2006	Mauna Kea	P. A. Wiegert	·	2.1 km	MPC · JPL
570340	2006 KR_{139}	—	May 23, 2006	Mount Lemmon	Mount Lemmon Survey	·	870 m	MPC · JPL
570341	2006 KX_{144}	—	May 19, 2006	Mount Lemmon	Mount Lemmon Survey	·	2.2 km	MPC · JPL
570342	2006 KW_{146}	—	September 24, 2012	Mount Lemmon	Mount Lemmon Survey	·	1.9 km	MPC · JPL
570343	2006 KX_{146}	—	October 3, 2013	Kitt Peak	Spacewatch	·	2.6 km	MPC · JPL
570344	2006 KO_{149}	—	March 22, 2015	Haleakala	Pan-STARRS 1	·	1.6 km	MPC · JPL
570345	2006 KX_{150}	—	December 26, 2011	Mount Lemmon	Mount Lemmon Survey	·	880 m	MPC · JPL
570346	2006 KX_{151}	—	May 8, 2014	Haleakala	Pan-STARRS 1	H	300 m	MPC · JPL
570347	2006 KG_{152}	—	November 3, 2008	Mount Lemmon	Mount Lemmon Survey	·	1.5 km	MPC · JPL
570348	2006 KV_{153}	—	October 27, 2008	Kitt Peak	Spacewatch	·	1.7 km	MPC · JPL
570349	2006 KE_{155}	—	October 11, 2012	Haleakala	Pan-STARRS 1	·	1.9 km	MPC · JPL
570350	2006 KH_{155}	—	May 27, 2006	Kitt Peak	Spacewatch	GEF	890 m	MPC · JPL
570351	2006 LL_{3}	—	May 27, 2006	Catalina	CSS	·	2.4 km	MPC · JPL
570352	2006 LH_{8}	—	June 7, 2006	La Silla	Bourban, G.	·	990 m	MPC · JPL
570353	2006 LL_{8}	—	April 2, 2009	Kitt Peak	Spacewatch	·	1.1 km	MPC · JPL
570354	2006 LJ_{9}	—	October 9, 2016	Haleakala	Pan-STARRS 1	·	1.1 km	MPC · JPL
570355	2006 MS_{4}	—	June 17, 2006	Kitt Peak	Spacewatch	·	1.2 km	MPC · JPL
570356	2006 MB_{10}	—	June 21, 2006	Kitt Peak	Spacewatch	·	1.1 km	MPC · JPL
570357	2006 MF_{12}	—	June 21, 2006	Lulin	LUSS	·	1.3 km	MPC · JPL
570358	2006 MT_{13}	—	June 22, 2006	Palomar	NEAT	·	1.6 km	MPC · JPL
570359	2006 MZ_{15}	—	December 9, 2012	Haleakala	Pan-STARRS 1	·	1.7 km	MPC · JPL
570360	2006 ML_{16}	—	March 18, 2010	Mount Lemmon	Mount Lemmon Survey	MAR	730 m	MPC · JPL
570361	2006 OZ_{3}	—	May 25, 2006	Mount Lemmon	Mount Lemmon Survey	·	2.3 km	MPC · JPL
570362	2006 OX_{14}	—	July 20, 2006	Reedy Creek	J. Broughton	·	1.2 km	MPC · JPL
570363	2006 OB_{27}	—	July 19, 2006	Mauna Kea	P. A. Wiegert, D. Subasinghe	·	1.8 km	MPC · JPL
570364	2006 OR_{34}	—	July 21, 2006	Mount Lemmon	Mount Lemmon Survey	KOR	1.1 km	MPC · JPL
570365	2006 OG_{35}	—	October 8, 2007	Kitt Peak	Spacewatch	·	1.3 km	MPC · JPL
570366	2006 OS_{37}	—	October 1, 2008	Mount Lemmon	Mount Lemmon Survey	L4	7.0 km	MPC · JPL
570367	2006 PU	—	August 6, 2006	Anderson Mesa	LONEOS	PHO	830 m	MPC · JPL
570368	2006 PO_{24}	—	August 12, 2006	Palomar	NEAT	·	2.2 km	MPC · JPL
570369	2006 PW_{33}	—	August 14, 2006	Siding Spring	SSS	V	690 m	MPC · JPL
570370	2006 PF_{34}	—	August 15, 2006	Palomar	NEAT	·	2.5 km	MPC · JPL
570371	2006 PK_{37}	—	August 12, 2006	Palomar	NEAT	·	910 m	MPC · JPL
570372	2006 PB_{38}	—	June 20, 2006	Mount Lemmon	Mount Lemmon Survey	·	2.2 km	MPC · JPL
570373	2006 PZ_{41}	—	July 21, 2006	Catalina	CSS	·	1.2 km	MPC · JPL
570374	2006 QW_{7}	—	August 19, 2006	Kitt Peak	Spacewatch	PHO	810 m	MPC · JPL
570375	2006 QV_{17}	—	August 16, 2006	Siding Spring	SSS	·	2.2 km	MPC · JPL
570376	2006 QG_{23}	—	August 21, 2006	Palomar	NEAT	NYS	1.1 km	MPC · JPL
570377	2006 QY_{26}	—	July 21, 2006	Catalina	CSS	·	2.8 km	MPC · JPL
570378	2006 QG_{31}	—	August 21, 2006	Kitt Peak	Spacewatch	·	1.7 km	MPC · JPL
570379	2006 QD_{44}	—	August 19, 2006	Kitt Peak	Spacewatch	PHO	700 m	MPC · JPL
570380	2006 QL_{46}	—	August 20, 2006	Palomar	NEAT	·	2.7 km	MPC · JPL
570381	2006 QQ_{46}	—	November 20, 2003	Kitt Peak	Spacewatch	·	660 m	MPC · JPL
570382	2006 QE_{48}	—	August 17, 2006	Palomar	NEAT	3:2	5.8 km	MPC · JPL
570383	2006 QO_{58}	—	August 27, 2006	Lulin	LUSS	·	2.0 km	MPC · JPL
570384	2006 QQ_{70}	—	August 21, 2006	Kitt Peak	Spacewatch	·	1.2 km	MPC · JPL
570385	2006 QA_{72}	—	August 21, 2006	Kitt Peak	Spacewatch	·	1.7 km	MPC · JPL
570386	2006 QO_{72}	—	August 21, 2006	Kitt Peak	Spacewatch	·	1.3 km	MPC · JPL
570387	2006 QE_{79}	—	August 23, 2006	Palomar	NEAT	·	550 m	MPC · JPL
570388	2006 QY_{80}	—	August 24, 2006	Palomar	NEAT	·	1.1 km	MPC · JPL
570389	2006 QX_{90}	—	August 17, 2006	Palomar	NEAT	·	1.3 km	MPC · JPL
570390	2006 QF_{101}	—	August 27, 2006	Kitt Peak	Spacewatch	PHO	880 m	MPC · JPL
570391	2006 QP_{102}	—	April 2, 2005	Mount Lemmon	Mount Lemmon Survey	AEO	920 m	MPC · JPL
570392	2006 QN_{109}	—	August 28, 2006	Kitt Peak	Spacewatch	·	2.1 km	MPC · JPL
570393	2006 QS_{109}	—	August 19, 2006	Kitt Peak	Spacewatch	·	1.3 km	MPC · JPL
570394	2006 QL_{111}	—	August 29, 2006	Lulin	LUSS	·	1.0 km	MPC · JPL
570395	2006 QV_{111}	—	August 22, 2006	Palomar	NEAT	·	920 m	MPC · JPL
570396	2006 QT_{129}	—	August 19, 2006	Anderson Mesa	LONEOS	·	2.2 km	MPC · JPL
570397	2006 QQ_{139}	—	August 17, 2006	Palomar	NEAT	·	720 m	MPC · JPL
570398	2006 QV_{149}	—	August 18, 2006	Kitt Peak	Spacewatch	·	1.9 km	MPC · JPL
570399	2006 QU_{150}	—	August 19, 2006	Kitt Peak	Spacewatch	·	1.5 km	MPC · JPL
570400	2006 QD_{152}	—	August 19, 2006	Kitt Peak	Spacewatch	·	2.0 km	MPC · JPL

== 570401–570500 ==
back to top

Designation			Discovery			Properties		Ref
Permanent	Provisional	Named after	Date	Site	Discoverer(s)	Category	Diam.	Ref
570401	2006 QA_{156}	—	August 19, 2006	Kitt Peak	Spacewatch	·	1.4 km	MPC · JPL
570402	2006 QT_{156}	—	August 19, 2006	Kitt Peak	Spacewatch	·	2.2 km	MPC · JPL
570403	2006 QC_{157}	—	August 19, 2006	Kitt Peak	Spacewatch	EOS	1.8 km	MPC · JPL
570404	2006 QZ_{157}	—	August 19, 2006	Kitt Peak	Spacewatch	TIR	2.1 km	MPC · JPL
570405	2006 QM_{186}	—	August 19, 2006	Kitt Peak	Spacewatch	MAS	580 m	MPC · JPL
570406	2006 QA_{189}	—	October 20, 2011	Mount Lemmon	Mount Lemmon Survey	AGN	1.1 km	MPC · JPL
570407	2006 QR_{189}	—	February 20, 2014	Haleakala	Pan-STARRS 1	EOS	1.8 km	MPC · JPL
570408	2006 QA_{190}	—	September 16, 2010	Mount Lemmon	Mount Lemmon Survey	·	980 m	MPC · JPL
570409	2006 QB_{190}	—	August 21, 2006	Kitt Peak	Spacewatch	EOS	1.9 km	MPC · JPL
570410	2006 QJ_{190}	—	August 29, 2006	Kitt Peak	Spacewatch	·	2.2 km	MPC · JPL
570411	2006 QF_{191}	—	August 19, 2006	Kitt Peak	Spacewatch	·	1.4 km	MPC · JPL
570412	2006 QG_{191}	—	August 27, 2006	Kitt Peak	Spacewatch	·	2.2 km	MPC · JPL
570413	2006 QY_{191}	—	August 28, 2006	Kitt Peak	Spacewatch	·	1.6 km	MPC · JPL
570414	2006 QR_{200}	—	August 19, 2006	Kitt Peak	Spacewatch	·	1.8 km	MPC · JPL
570415	2006 QV_{200}	—	July 14, 2016	Haleakala	Pan-STARRS 1	·	1.5 km	MPC · JPL
570416	2006 QN_{201}	—	January 31, 2009	Kitt Peak	Spacewatch	·	1.6 km	MPC · JPL
570417	2006 QQ_{201}	—	October 13, 2007	Kitt Peak	Spacewatch	3:2	4.3 km	MPC · JPL
570418	2006 QZ_{201}	—	September 18, 2012	Mount Lemmon	Mount Lemmon Survey	·	2.7 km	MPC · JPL
570419	2006 QG_{202}	—	August 19, 2006	Kitt Peak	Spacewatch	·	970 m	MPC · JPL
570420	2006 QL_{202}	—	August 28, 2006	Kitt Peak	Spacewatch	·	600 m	MPC · JPL
570421	2006 QX_{202}	—	August 28, 2006	Kitt Peak	Spacewatch	·	1.9 km	MPC · JPL
570422	2006 QY_{202}	—	August 19, 2006	Kitt Peak	Spacewatch	·	740 m	MPC · JPL
570423	2006 QO_{203}	—	August 27, 2006	Kitt Peak	Spacewatch	·	1.3 km	MPC · JPL
570424	2006 QS_{203}	—	August 19, 2006	Kitt Peak	Spacewatch	·	1.7 km	MPC · JPL
570425	2006 QB_{204}	—	August 18, 2006	Kitt Peak	Spacewatch	·	2.0 km	MPC · JPL
570426	2006 QP_{204}	—	August 19, 2006	Kitt Peak	Spacewatch	·	460 m	MPC · JPL
570427	2006 RF_{13}	—	September 14, 2006	Kitt Peak	Spacewatch	EOS	1.5 km	MPC · JPL
570428	2006 RX_{13}	—	August 17, 2006	Palomar	NEAT	·	1.9 km	MPC · JPL
570429	2006 RY_{21}	—	September 15, 2006	Catalina	CSS	H	450 m	MPC · JPL
570430	2006 RJ_{22}	—	September 15, 2006	Palomar	NEAT	·	1.3 km	MPC · JPL
570431	2006 RM_{24}	—	September 14, 2006	Kitt Peak	Spacewatch	JUN	1.1 km	MPC · JPL
570432	2006 RY_{34}	—	September 15, 2006	Catalina	CSS	·	3.2 km	MPC · JPL
570433	2006 RB_{65}	—	August 29, 2006	Kitt Peak	Spacewatch	·	1.4 km	MPC · JPL
570434	2006 RL_{72}	—	September 15, 2006	Kitt Peak	Spacewatch	·	2.6 km	MPC · JPL
570435	2006 RX_{74}	—	September 15, 2006	Kitt Peak	Spacewatch	·	1.4 km	MPC · JPL
570436	2006 RR_{76}	—	September 15, 2006	Kitt Peak	Spacewatch	NYS	950 m	MPC · JPL
570437	2006 RH_{79}	—	September 15, 2006	Kitt Peak	Spacewatch	·	1.3 km	MPC · JPL
570438	2006 RJ_{87}	—	September 15, 2006	Kitt Peak	Spacewatch	KOR	970 m	MPC · JPL
570439	2006 RO_{88}	—	September 15, 2006	Kitt Peak	Spacewatch	·	2.4 km	MPC · JPL
570440	2006 RF_{92}	—	September 15, 2006	Kitt Peak	Spacewatch	H	430 m	MPC · JPL
570441	2006 RS_{92}	—	September 15, 2006	Kitt Peak	Spacewatch	·	2.4 km	MPC · JPL
570442	2006 RY_{92}	—	September 15, 2006	Kitt Peak	Spacewatch	EOS	1.5 km	MPC · JPL
570443	2006 RJ_{97}	—	September 15, 2006	Kitt Peak	Spacewatch	·	2.0 km	MPC · JPL
570444	2006 RL_{100}	—	September 14, 2006	Catalina	CSS	·	2.8 km	MPC · JPL
570445	2006 RX_{100}	—	August 16, 2006	Palomar	NEAT	TEL	1.8 km	MPC · JPL
570446	2006 RQ_{103}	—	September 11, 2006	Apache Point	SDSS Collaboration	EOS	1.6 km	MPC · JPL
570447	2006 RX_{106}	—	September 19, 2006	Kitt Peak	Spacewatch	·	1.9 km	MPC · JPL
570448 Travismetcalfe	2006 RX_{112}	Travismetcalfe	September 14, 2006	Mauna Kea	Masiero, J., R. Jedicke	EOS	1.2 km	MPC · JPL
570449	2006 RW_{116}	—	September 14, 2006	Kitt Peak	Spacewatch	MAS	590 m	MPC · JPL
570450	2006 RC_{125}	—	September 15, 2006	Kitt Peak	Spacewatch	EOS	1.5 km	MPC · JPL
570451	2006 SN_{1}	—	September 16, 2006	Kitt Peak	Spacewatch	H	420 m	MPC · JPL
570452	2006 SC_{13}	—	September 17, 2006	Catalina	CSS	·	2.0 km	MPC · JPL
570453	2006 SQ_{18}	—	August 19, 2006	Anderson Mesa	LONEOS	·	3.3 km	MPC · JPL
570454	2006 SQ_{23}	—	September 18, 2006	Catalina	CSS	·	2.2 km	MPC · JPL
570455	2006 SG_{28}	—	August 19, 2006	Kitt Peak	Spacewatch	·	2.0 km	MPC · JPL
570456	2006 SR_{28}	—	September 17, 2006	Kitt Peak	Spacewatch	·	1.8 km	MPC · JPL
570457	2006 SP_{30}	—	September 17, 2006	Kitt Peak	Spacewatch	·	1.5 km	MPC · JPL
570458	2006 SG_{31}	—	August 29, 2006	Kitt Peak	Spacewatch	ERI	1.1 km	MPC · JPL
570459	2006 SH_{31}	—	August 29, 2006	Kitt Peak	Spacewatch	V	620 m	MPC · JPL
570460	2006 SX_{31}	—	September 17, 2006	Kitt Peak	Spacewatch	·	1.9 km	MPC · JPL
570461	2006 SJ_{42}	—	September 18, 2006	Kitt Peak	Spacewatch	4:3	4.4 km	MPC · JPL
570462	2006 SF_{48}	—	September 19, 2006	Kitt Peak	Spacewatch	·	2.5 km	MPC · JPL
570463	2006 SG_{51}	—	September 17, 2006	Catalina	CSS	·	610 m	MPC · JPL
570464	2006 SX_{57}	—	September 17, 2006	Kitt Peak	Spacewatch	·	2.5 km	MPC · JPL
570465	2006 SR_{58}	—	September 28, 2001	Palomar	NEAT	·	1.9 km	MPC · JPL
570466	2006 SY_{65}	—	September 19, 2006	Kitt Peak	Spacewatch	·	1.2 km	MPC · JPL
570467	2006 SX_{70}	—	September 19, 2006	Kitt Peak	Spacewatch	T_{j} (2.96) · 3:2	4.6 km	MPC · JPL
570468	2006 SA_{83}	—	September 18, 2006	Kitt Peak	Spacewatch	·	2.0 km	MPC · JPL
570469	2006 SM_{83}	—	September 18, 2006	Kitt Peak	Spacewatch	·	1.5 km	MPC · JPL
570470	2006 SY_{84}	—	September 18, 2006	Kitt Peak	Spacewatch	·	1.6 km	MPC · JPL
570471	2006 SA_{88}	—	September 28, 2011	Mount Lemmon	Mount Lemmon Survey	·	1.5 km	MPC · JPL
570472	2006 SA_{89}	—	February 3, 2000	Kitt Peak	Spacewatch	MAS	660 m	MPC · JPL
570473	2006 SL_{89}	—	September 18, 2006	Kitt Peak	Spacewatch	·	2.0 km	MPC · JPL
570474	2006 SA_{98}	—	September 18, 2006	Kitt Peak	Spacewatch	·	1.7 km	MPC · JPL
570475	2006 SL_{98}	—	September 18, 2006	Kitt Peak	Spacewatch	·	1.6 km	MPC · JPL
570476	2006 SK_{105}	—	September 19, 2006	Kitt Peak	Spacewatch	·	1.4 km	MPC · JPL
570477	2006 SY_{105}	—	September 19, 2006	Kitt Peak	Spacewatch	·	1.1 km	MPC · JPL
570478	2006 SW_{126}	—	September 22, 2006	Anderson Mesa	LONEOS	T_{j} (2.99)	2.8 km	MPC · JPL
570479	2006 ST_{136}	—	November 8, 2007	Mount Lemmon	Mount Lemmon Survey	EOS	2.3 km	MPC · JPL
570480	2006 SX_{142}	—	September 19, 2006	Kitt Peak	Spacewatch	·	2.1 km	MPC · JPL
570481	2006 SH_{146}	—	September 19, 2006	Kitt Peak	Spacewatch	NYS	780 m	MPC · JPL
570482	2006 SW_{148}	—	September 19, 2006	Kitt Peak	Spacewatch	·	1.6 km	MPC · JPL
570483	2006 SH_{158}	—	September 23, 2006	Kitt Peak	Spacewatch	KOR	1.2 km	MPC · JPL
570484	2006 SP_{163}	—	September 24, 2006	Kitt Peak	Spacewatch	·	1.4 km	MPC · JPL
570485	2006 SX_{163}	—	September 24, 2006	Bergisch Gladbach	W. Bickel	KOR	1.2 km	MPC · JPL
570486	2006 SJ_{168}	—	September 17, 2006	Kitt Peak	Spacewatch	·	2.2 km	MPC · JPL
570487	2006 SS_{169}	—	September 25, 2006	Kitt Peak	Spacewatch	·	2.1 km	MPC · JPL
570488	2006 SF_{172}	—	September 25, 2006	Kitt Peak	Spacewatch	·	740 m	MPC · JPL
570489	2006 SE_{173}	—	September 25, 2006	Kitt Peak	Spacewatch	·	1.6 km	MPC · JPL
570490	2006 SS_{177}	—	September 18, 2006	Kitt Peak	Spacewatch	·	2.0 km	MPC · JPL
570491	2006 SK_{179}	—	September 25, 2006	Kitt Peak	Spacewatch	·	2.0 km	MPC · JPL
570492	2006 SW_{179}	—	September 21, 1995	Kitt Peak	Spacewatch	·	2.4 km	MPC · JPL
570493	2006 SZ_{179}	—	September 25, 2006	Kitt Peak	Spacewatch	·	2.1 km	MPC · JPL
570494	2006 SU_{181}	—	September 25, 2006	Mount Lemmon	Mount Lemmon Survey	·	2.6 km	MPC · JPL
570495	2006 SY_{183}	—	September 25, 2006	Kitt Peak	Spacewatch	·	1.1 km	MPC · JPL
570496	2006 SA_{184}	—	September 18, 2006	Kitt Peak	Spacewatch	·	2.2 km	MPC · JPL
570497	2006 SA_{190}	—	September 26, 2006	Mount Lemmon	Mount Lemmon Survey	EOS	1.7 km	MPC · JPL
570498	2006 SO_{190}	—	September 26, 2006	Mount Lemmon	Mount Lemmon Survey	·	910 m	MPC · JPL
570499	2006 SD_{191}	—	September 19, 2006	Kitt Peak	Spacewatch	·	1.8 km	MPC · JPL
570500	2006 SE_{197}	—	September 20, 2006	Bergisch Gladbach	W. Bickel	EOS	1.8 km	MPC · JPL

== 570501–570600 ==
back to top

Designation			Discovery			Properties		Ref
Permanent	Provisional	Named after	Date	Site	Discoverer(s)	Category	Diam.	Ref
570501	2006 SC_{203}	—	September 22, 1995	Kitt Peak	Spacewatch	·	2.2 km	MPC · JPL
570502	2006 SZ_{206}	—	September 25, 2006	Mount Lemmon	Mount Lemmon Survey	·	2.5 km	MPC · JPL
570503	2006 SN_{213}	—	August 21, 2006	Kitt Peak	Spacewatch	·	1.2 km	MPC · JPL
570504	2006 SG_{219}	—	September 23, 2006	Kitt Peak	Spacewatch	·	1.6 km	MPC · JPL
570505	2006 SV_{219}	—	August 28, 2006	Catalina	CSS	·	1.0 km	MPC · JPL
570506	2006 SB_{228}	—	September 26, 2006	Kitt Peak	Spacewatch	·	1.8 km	MPC · JPL
570507	2006 SP_{231}	—	September 18, 2006	Kitt Peak	Spacewatch	EOS	1.8 km	MPC · JPL
570508	2006 SR_{233}	—	September 18, 2006	Kitt Peak	Spacewatch	EOS	1.5 km	MPC · JPL
570509	2006 SU_{240}	—	September 26, 2006	Kitt Peak	Spacewatch	EOS	1.3 km	MPC · JPL
570510	2006 SJ_{242}	—	September 26, 2006	Kitt Peak	Spacewatch	THM	1.3 km	MPC · JPL
570511	2006 SA_{243}	—	October 15, 2001	Kitt Peak	Spacewatch	·	1.9 km	MPC · JPL
570512	2006 SO_{245}	—	October 1, 1995	Kitt Peak	Spacewatch	·	2.4 km	MPC · JPL
570513	2006 ST_{246}	—	September 15, 2006	Kitt Peak	Spacewatch	·	1.8 km	MPC · JPL
570514	2006 SS_{261}	—	September 26, 2006	Mount Lemmon	Mount Lemmon Survey	NYS	810 m	MPC · JPL
570515	2006 SF_{278}	—	August 29, 2006	Kitt Peak	Spacewatch	·	820 m	MPC · JPL
570516	2006 SB_{289}	—	September 26, 2006	Catalina	CSS	·	1.4 km	MPC · JPL
570517	2006 SR_{290}	—	October 3, 2006	Kitt Peak	Spacewatch	NYS	990 m	MPC · JPL
570518	2006 SD_{293}	—	August 21, 2006	Kitt Peak	Spacewatch	·	2.1 km	MPC · JPL
570519	2006 SD_{304}	—	September 27, 2006	Mount Lemmon	Mount Lemmon Survey	·	1.3 km	MPC · JPL
570520	2006 SA_{305}	—	October 15, 2001	Apache Point	SDSS Collaboration	·	1.8 km	MPC · JPL
570521	2006 SP_{305}	—	April 17, 2005	Kitt Peak	Spacewatch	·	1.2 km	MPC · JPL
570522	2006 SG_{306}	—	September 27, 2006	Kitt Peak	Spacewatch	·	530 m	MPC · JPL
570523	2006 SS_{307}	—	September 17, 2006	Kitt Peak	Spacewatch	·	2.3 km	MPC · JPL
570524	2006 SB_{314}	—	September 17, 2006	Kitt Peak	Spacewatch	URS	2.8 km	MPC · JPL
570525	2006 SB_{322}	—	September 17, 2006	Kitt Peak	Spacewatch	T_{j} (2.98) · 3:2 · SHU	4.8 km	MPC · JPL
570526	2006 SM_{324}	—	September 14, 2006	Kitt Peak	Spacewatch	·	1.7 km	MPC · JPL
570527	2006 SK_{327}	—	September 27, 2006	Kitt Peak	Spacewatch	·	1.7 km	MPC · JPL
570528	2006 SQ_{330}	—	September 28, 2006	Kitt Peak	Spacewatch	·	580 m	MPC · JPL
570529	2006 SY_{331}	—	September 28, 2006	Mount Lemmon	Mount Lemmon Survey	VER	2.2 km	MPC · JPL
570530	2006 SH_{339}	—	September 28, 2006	Kitt Peak	Spacewatch	·	1.5 km	MPC · JPL
570531	2006 SJ_{339}	—	September 28, 2006	Kitt Peak	Spacewatch	·	1.8 km	MPC · JPL
570532	2006 SA_{342}	—	September 28, 2006	Kitt Peak	Spacewatch	GAL	970 m	MPC · JPL
570533	2006 SF_{343}	—	September 28, 2006	Kitt Peak	Spacewatch	TEL	1.1 km	MPC · JPL
570534	2006 SV_{343}	—	September 28, 2006	Kitt Peak	Spacewatch	EOS	1.8 km	MPC · JPL
570535	2006 SX_{344}	—	September 28, 2006	Kitt Peak	Spacewatch	(7605)	3.3 km	MPC · JPL
570536	2006 SE_{346}	—	September 28, 2006	Kitt Peak	Spacewatch	·	610 m	MPC · JPL
570537	2006 ST_{360}	—	September 30, 2006	Mount Lemmon	Mount Lemmon Survey	EOS	1.5 km	MPC · JPL
570538	2006 SW_{368}	—	September 30, 2006	Siding Spring	SSS	PHO	1.3 km	MPC · JPL
570539	2006 SG_{374}	—	September 16, 2006	Apache Point	SDSS Collaboration	EOS	1.1 km	MPC · JPL
570540	2006 SS_{374}	—	September 16, 2006	Apache Point	SDSS Collaboration	·	1.2 km	MPC · JPL
570541	2006 SH_{375}	—	September 17, 2006	Apache Point	SDSS Collaboration	·	1.5 km	MPC · JPL
570542	2006 SU_{376}	—	November 11, 2006	Mount Lemmon	Mount Lemmon Survey	·	2.2 km	MPC · JPL
570543	2006 SV_{376}	—	September 17, 2006	Apache Point	SDSS Collaboration	·	2.8 km	MPC · JPL
570544	2006 SF_{377}	—	September 17, 2006	Apache Point	SDSS Collaboration	EOS	1.6 km	MPC · JPL
570545	2006 SG_{377}	—	September 17, 2006	Apache Point	SDSS Collaboration	·	2.3 km	MPC · JPL
570546	2006 SZ_{377}	—	September 17, 2006	Apache Point	SDSS Collaboration	·	1.7 km	MPC · JPL
570547	2006 SM_{384}	—	September 17, 2006	Apache Point	SDSS Collaboration	EOS	1.5 km	MPC · JPL
570548	2006 SM_{386}	—	September 11, 2006	Apache Point	SDSS Collaboration	·	1.9 km	MPC · JPL
570549	2006 SJ_{389}	—	September 30, 2006	Apache Point	SDSS Collaboration	·	1.7 km	MPC · JPL
570550	2006 SR_{411}	—	September 20, 2006	Catalina	CSS	·	2.1 km	MPC · JPL
570551	2006 SA_{413}	—	September 17, 2006	Catalina	CSS	·	2.4 km	MPC · JPL
570552	2006 SN_{423}	—	September 27, 2006	Mount Lemmon	Mount Lemmon Survey	·	2.0 km	MPC · JPL
570553	2006 SN_{424}	—	September 30, 2006	Mount Lemmon	Mount Lemmon Survey	·	2.1 km	MPC · JPL
570554	2006 SO_{424}	—	September 30, 2006	Mount Lemmon	Mount Lemmon Survey	·	2.7 km	MPC · JPL
570555	2006 SC_{425}	—	September 26, 2006	Mount Lemmon	Mount Lemmon Survey	·	2.0 km	MPC · JPL
570556	2006 SE_{425}	—	September 26, 2006	Kitt Peak	Spacewatch	·	2.0 km	MPC · JPL
570557	2006 SB_{426}	—	December 1, 2014	Haleakala	Pan-STARRS 1	·	1.0 km	MPC · JPL
570558	2006 SH_{427}	—	September 28, 2006	Kitt Peak	Spacewatch	·	440 m	MPC · JPL
570559	2006 SY_{428}	—	September 17, 2006	Kitt Peak	Spacewatch	VER	2.1 km	MPC · JPL
570560	2006 SM_{429}	—	September 19, 2006	Kitt Peak	Spacewatch	EOS	1.4 km	MPC · JPL
570561	2006 SB_{430}	—	September 18, 2006	Kitt Peak	Spacewatch	EOS	1.4 km	MPC · JPL
570562	2006 SM_{430}	—	August 26, 2011	Piszkéstető	K. Sárneczky	·	2.0 km	MPC · JPL
570563	2006 SP_{433}	—	October 24, 2013	Mount Lemmon	Mount Lemmon Survey	·	510 m	MPC · JPL
570564	2006 SA_{434}	—	May 16, 2009	Mount Lemmon	Mount Lemmon Survey	·	1.2 km	MPC · JPL
570565	2006 SJ_{434}	—	September 19, 2006	Kitt Peak	Spacewatch	·	1.6 km	MPC · JPL
570566	2006 SB_{440}	—	September 17, 2006	Kitt Peak	Spacewatch	·	1.5 km	MPC · JPL
570567	2006 SR_{440}	—	December 18, 2007	Nogales	P. R. Holvorcem, M. Schwartz	EOS	1.6 km	MPC · JPL
570568	2006 ST_{440}	—	March 16, 2009	Mount Lemmon	Mount Lemmon Survey	KOR	1.4 km	MPC · JPL
570569	2006 SO_{441}	—	September 23, 2011	Haleakala	Pan-STARRS 1	KOR	1.1 km	MPC · JPL
570570	2006 SQ_{441}	—	September 28, 2006	Kitt Peak	Spacewatch	·	550 m	MPC · JPL
570571	2006 SK_{442}	—	November 26, 2014	Haleakala	Pan-STARRS 1	·	1.3 km	MPC · JPL
570572	2006 SF_{444}	—	September 19, 2006	Kitt Peak	Spacewatch	·	1.5 km	MPC · JPL
570573	2006 SW_{446}	—	September 26, 2006	Kitt Peak	Spacewatch	·	1.7 km	MPC · JPL
570574	2006 SC_{448}	—	September 17, 2006	Kitt Peak	Spacewatch	·	2.0 km	MPC · JPL
570575	2006 SJ_{448}	—	September 17, 2006	Kitt Peak	Spacewatch	·	1.4 km	MPC · JPL
570576	2006 SK_{448}	—	September 28, 2006	Kitt Peak	Spacewatch	EOS	1.4 km	MPC · JPL
570577	2006 SF_{450}	—	September 17, 2006	Kitt Peak	Spacewatch	MAS	500 m	MPC · JPL
570578	2006 SQ_{453}	—	September 17, 2006	Kitt Peak	Spacewatch	·	580 m	MPC · JPL
570579	2006 TV_{9}	—	October 13, 2006	Pla D'Arguines	R. Ferrando, Ferrando, M.	·	2.0 km	MPC · JPL
570580	2006 TR_{12}	—	September 27, 2006	Anderson Mesa	LONEOS	·	1.3 km	MPC · JPL
570581	2006 TC_{32}	—	September 26, 2006	Mount Lemmon	Mount Lemmon Survey	·	2.0 km	MPC · JPL
570582	2006 TO_{47}	—	October 12, 2006	Kitt Peak	Spacewatch	·	2.3 km	MPC · JPL
570583	2006 TG_{56}	—	October 13, 2006	Kitt Peak	Spacewatch	·	1.3 km	MPC · JPL
570584	2006 TU_{58}	—	October 13, 2006	Kitt Peak	Spacewatch	·	3.3 km	MPC · JPL
570585	2006 TQ_{60}	—	September 20, 2006	Bergisch Gladbach	W. Bickel	EOS	1.4 km	MPC · JPL
570586	2006 TH_{61}	—	September 17, 2006	Kitt Peak	Spacewatch	·	1.6 km	MPC · JPL
570587	2006 TT_{61}	—	October 4, 2006	Mount Lemmon	Mount Lemmon Survey	·	2.5 km	MPC · JPL
570588	2006 TM_{64}	—	October 11, 2006	Kitt Peak	Spacewatch	·	1.0 km	MPC · JPL
570589	2006 TN_{65}	—	September 20, 2006	Palomar	NEAT	EOS	1.9 km	MPC · JPL
570590	2006 TA_{66}	—	September 21, 2001	Apache Point	SDSS Collaboration	EOS	2.4 km	MPC · JPL
570591	2006 TR_{79}	—	October 13, 2006	Kitt Peak	Spacewatch	EOS	1.7 km	MPC · JPL
570592	2006 TO_{95}	—	October 3, 2006	Mount Lemmon	Mount Lemmon Survey	H	480 m	MPC · JPL
570593	2006 TE_{96}	—	September 14, 2002	Palomar	NEAT	·	1.2 km	MPC · JPL
570594	2006 TD_{99}	—	October 15, 2006	Kitt Peak	Spacewatch	VER	2.6 km	MPC · JPL
570595	2006 TA_{103}	—	September 28, 2006	Mount Lemmon	Mount Lemmon Survey	·	1.7 km	MPC · JPL
570596	2006 TH_{111}	—	October 1, 2006	Apache Point	SDSS Collaboration	·	2.6 km	MPC · JPL
570597	2006 TX_{111}	—	October 1, 2006	Apache Point	SDSS Collaboration	·	2.3 km	MPC · JPL
570598	2006 TO_{112}	—	October 1, 2006	Apache Point	SDSS Collaboration	·	2.5 km	MPC · JPL
570599	2006 TC_{113}	—	October 1, 2006	Apache Point	SDSS Collaboration	·	2.5 km	MPC · JPL
570600	2006 TC_{114}	—	October 1, 2006	Apache Point	SDSS Collaboration	EOS	1.2 km	MPC · JPL

== 570601–570700 ==
back to top

Designation			Discovery			Properties		Ref
Permanent	Provisional	Named after	Date	Site	Discoverer(s)	Category	Diam.	Ref
570601	2006 TQ_{114}	—	September 19, 2006	Apache Point	SDSS Collaboration	·	2.5 km	MPC · JPL
570602	2006 TX_{114}	—	October 1, 2006	Apache Point	SDSS Collaboration	EOS	1.5 km	MPC · JPL
570603	2006 TK_{115}	—	September 19, 2006	Apache Point	SDSS Collaboration	EOS	790 m	MPC · JPL
570604	2006 TR_{115}	—	October 1, 2006	Apache Point	SDSS Collaboration	·	1.1 km	MPC · JPL
570605	2006 TD_{116}	—	September 11, 2006	Apache Point	SDSS Collaboration	EOS	1.6 km	MPC · JPL
570606	2006 TO_{119}	—	October 11, 2006	Apache Point	SDSS Collaboration	·	3.1 km	MPC · JPL
570607	2006 TP_{119}	—	October 28, 2006	Catalina	CSS	·	2.4 km	MPC · JPL
570608	2006 TQ_{119}	—	October 1, 2006	Apache Point	SDSS Collaboration	·	2.2 km	MPC · JPL
570609	2006 TL_{120}	—	October 12, 2006	Apache Point	SDSS Collaboration	EOS	2.0 km	MPC · JPL
570610	2006 TE_{131}	—	October 2, 2006	Mount Lemmon	Mount Lemmon Survey	·	1.7 km	MPC · JPL
570611	2006 TF_{131}	—	October 2, 2006	Mount Lemmon	Mount Lemmon Survey	·	1.6 km	MPC · JPL
570612	2006 TZ_{133}	—	October 3, 2006	Mount Lemmon	Mount Lemmon Survey	·	2.7 km	MPC · JPL
570613	2006 TH_{134}	—	February 7, 2008	Kitt Peak	Spacewatch	LIX	3.1 km	MPC · JPL
570614	2006 TO_{136}	—	October 11, 2006	Palomar	NEAT	PHO	720 m	MPC · JPL
570615	2006 TF_{140}	—	October 2, 2006	Kitt Peak	Spacewatch	EOS	1.6 km	MPC · JPL
570616	2006 TH_{140}	—	October 11, 2006	Kitt Peak	Spacewatch	·	2.2 km	MPC · JPL
570617	2006 TE_{141}	—	October 4, 2006	Mount Lemmon	Mount Lemmon Survey	·	2.0 km	MPC · JPL
570618	2006 TV_{141}	—	October 2, 2006	Mount Lemmon	Mount Lemmon Survey	·	1.3 km	MPC · JPL
570619	2006 TR_{142}	—	October 2, 2006	Mount Lemmon	Mount Lemmon Survey	·	3.2 km	MPC · JPL
570620	2006 TT_{142}	—	October 13, 2006	Kitt Peak	Spacewatch	EOS	1.5 km	MPC · JPL
570621	2006 UE_{4}	—	October 18, 2006	Piszkéstető	K. Sárneczky	·	2.3 km	MPC · JPL
570622	2006 UZ_{13}	—	September 30, 2006	Mount Lemmon	Mount Lemmon Survey	·	2.9 km	MPC · JPL
570623	2006 UE_{25}	—	September 25, 2006	Mount Lemmon	Mount Lemmon Survey	EOS	1.6 km	MPC · JPL
570624	2006 UK_{28}	—	October 16, 2006	Kitt Peak	Spacewatch	·	2.4 km	MPC · JPL
570625	2006 UE_{33}	—	October 16, 2006	Kitt Peak	Spacewatch	HOF	2.0 km	MPC · JPL
570626	2006 UP_{34}	—	September 26, 2006	Mount Lemmon	Mount Lemmon Survey	·	2.6 km	MPC · JPL
570627	2006 UT_{35}	—	September 30, 2006	Mount Lemmon	Mount Lemmon Survey	·	2.1 km	MPC · JPL
570628	2006 UD_{36}	—	September 28, 2006	Mount Lemmon	Mount Lemmon Survey	·	2.5 km	MPC · JPL
570629	2006 US_{37}	—	October 16, 2006	Kitt Peak	Spacewatch	·	2.2 km	MPC · JPL
570630	2006 UT_{47}	—	October 17, 2006	Kitt Peak	Spacewatch	EOS	2.2 km	MPC · JPL
570631	2006 UH_{48}	—	October 17, 2006	Kitt Peak	Spacewatch	·	1.1 km	MPC · JPL
570632	2006 UZ_{49}	—	October 17, 2006	Kitt Peak	Spacewatch	·	1.3 km	MPC · JPL
570633	2006 UD_{50}	—	October 17, 2006	Kitt Peak	Spacewatch	EOS	1.4 km	MPC · JPL
570634	2006 UO_{60}	—	October 19, 2006	Kitt Peak	Spacewatch	·	860 m	MPC · JPL
570635	2006 UD_{67}	—	October 16, 2006	Mount Lemmon	Mount Lemmon Survey	·	1.5 km	MPC · JPL
570636	2006 UO_{71}	—	October 17, 2006	Bergisch Gladbach	W. Bickel	·	1.9 km	MPC · JPL
570637	2006 UA_{82}	—	October 17, 2006	Kitt Peak	Spacewatch	·	3.3 km	MPC · JPL
570638	2006 UU_{90}	—	September 27, 2006	Mount Lemmon	Mount Lemmon Survey	·	740 m	MPC · JPL
570639	2006 UP_{101}	—	October 18, 2006	Kitt Peak	Spacewatch	·	2.4 km	MPC · JPL
570640	2006 UH_{102}	—	October 3, 2006	Mount Lemmon	Mount Lemmon Survey	·	720 m	MPC · JPL
570641	2006 UG_{103}	—	October 18, 2006	Kitt Peak	Spacewatch	·	2.7 km	MPC · JPL
570642	2006 UQ_{112}	—	September 19, 2006	Kitt Peak	Spacewatch	H	380 m	MPC · JPL
570643	2006 UD_{114}	—	October 19, 2006	Kitt Peak	Spacewatch	·	1.7 km	MPC · JPL
570644	2006 UM_{116}	—	October 2, 2006	Kitt Peak	Spacewatch	EOS	1.7 km	MPC · JPL
570645	2006 UZ_{119}	—	October 19, 2006	Kitt Peak	Spacewatch	·	2.3 km	MPC · JPL
570646	2006 UA_{120}	—	October 19, 2006	Kitt Peak	Spacewatch	·	1.4 km	MPC · JPL
570647	2006 UA_{121}	—	October 3, 2006	Mount Lemmon	Mount Lemmon Survey	·	1.3 km	MPC · JPL
570648	2006 UL_{125}	—	October 19, 2006	Kitt Peak	Spacewatch	EOS	1.5 km	MPC · JPL
570649	2006 UO_{125}	—	October 19, 2006	Kitt Peak	Spacewatch	·	2.5 km	MPC · JPL
570650	2006 UD_{127}	—	October 19, 2006	Kitt Peak	Spacewatch	·	2.3 km	MPC · JPL
570651	2006 UH_{128}	—	October 19, 2006	Kitt Peak	Spacewatch	·	1.0 km	MPC · JPL
570652	2006 UM_{131}	—	October 2, 2006	Mount Lemmon	Mount Lemmon Survey	·	2.4 km	MPC · JPL
570653	2006 UY_{137}	—	October 19, 2006	Kitt Peak	Spacewatch	VER	2.3 km	MPC · JPL
570654	2006 UA_{138}	—	October 19, 2006	Kitt Peak	Spacewatch	·	3.3 km	MPC · JPL
570655	2006 UM_{139}	—	October 19, 2006	Mount Lemmon	Mount Lemmon Survey	EOS	1.6 km	MPC · JPL
570656	2006 UP_{144}	—	October 20, 2006	Kitt Peak	Spacewatch	EOS	1.9 km	MPC · JPL
570657	2006 UY_{150}	—	October 20, 2006	Mount Lemmon	Mount Lemmon Survey	·	1.4 km	MPC · JPL
570658	2006 UD_{151}	—	October 20, 2006	Mount Lemmon	Mount Lemmon Survey	·	2.3 km	MPC · JPL
570659	2006 UM_{152}	—	October 21, 2006	Kitt Peak	Spacewatch	EOS	1.8 km	MPC · JPL
570660	2006 UX_{154}	—	September 27, 2006	Mount Lemmon	Mount Lemmon Survey	·	1.8 km	MPC · JPL
570661	2006 UJ_{159}	—	October 21, 2006	Mount Lemmon	Mount Lemmon Survey	·	1.0 km	MPC · JPL
570662	2006 UW_{160}	—	October 21, 2006	Mount Lemmon	Mount Lemmon Survey	·	2.0 km	MPC · JPL
570663	2006 UX_{160}	—	October 21, 2006	Mount Lemmon	Mount Lemmon Survey	EOS	1.6 km	MPC · JPL
570664	2006 UW_{162}	—	October 21, 2006	Mount Lemmon	Mount Lemmon Survey	EOS	1.6 km	MPC · JPL
570665	2006 UF_{167}	—	October 3, 2006	Mount Lemmon	Mount Lemmon Survey	·	2.6 km	MPC · JPL
570666	2006 UL_{167}	—	September 27, 2006	Kitt Peak	Spacewatch	·	2.5 km	MPC · JPL
570667	2006 US_{182}	—	October 16, 2006	Catalina	CSS	·	2.6 km	MPC · JPL
570668	2006 UA_{184}	—	October 19, 2006	Catalina	CSS	·	2.1 km	MPC · JPL
570669	2006 UG_{197}	—	October 12, 2006	Kitt Peak	Spacewatch	EOS	1.5 km	MPC · JPL
570670	2006 UK_{197}	—	September 27, 2006	Mount Lemmon	Mount Lemmon Survey	3:2 · (6124)	5.6 km	MPC · JPL
570671	2006 UW_{201}	—	September 24, 2006	Kitt Peak	Spacewatch	·	1.0 km	MPC · JPL
570672	2006 UA_{203}	—	September 26, 2006	Catalina	CSS	T_{j} (2.95)	4.8 km	MPC · JPL
570673	2006 UA_{207}	—	October 23, 2006	Kitt Peak	Spacewatch	·	1.7 km	MPC · JPL
570674	2006 UC_{209}	—	October 23, 2006	Kitt Peak	Spacewatch	THM	1.8 km	MPC · JPL
570675	2006 UN_{209}	—	September 30, 2006	Mount Lemmon	Mount Lemmon Survey	·	1.3 km	MPC · JPL
570676	2006 UL_{211}	—	October 23, 2006	Kitt Peak	Spacewatch	EOS	1.8 km	MPC · JPL
570677	2006 UF_{225}	—	October 19, 2006	Mount Lemmon	Mount Lemmon Survey	·	3.1 km	MPC · JPL
570678	2006 UW_{228}	—	October 23, 2006	Mount Lemmon	Mount Lemmon Survey	·	2.6 km	MPC · JPL
570679	2006 UL_{230}	—	October 2, 2006	Mount Lemmon	Mount Lemmon Survey	·	1.6 km	MPC · JPL
570680	2006 UH_{232}	—	September 26, 2006	Catalina	CSS	PHO	900 m	MPC · JPL
570681	2006 UP_{232}	—	October 22, 2006	Palomar	NEAT	·	1.4 km	MPC · JPL
570682	2006 UK_{235}	—	September 19, 2006	Kitt Peak	Spacewatch	PHO	660 m	MPC · JPL
570683	2006 UH_{236}	—	May 13, 2004	Kitt Peak	Spacewatch	EOS	2.0 km	MPC · JPL
570684	2006 UZ_{239}	—	October 23, 2006	Kitt Peak	Spacewatch	·	2.2 km	MPC · JPL
570685	2006 UR_{253}	—	September 26, 2006	Mount Lemmon	Mount Lemmon Survey	VER	2.4 km	MPC · JPL
570686	2006 UE_{256}	—	October 27, 2006	Kitt Peak	Spacewatch	·	2.4 km	MPC · JPL
570687	2006 UZ_{258}	—	October 16, 2006	Kitt Peak	Spacewatch	·	3.0 km	MPC · JPL
570688	2006 UP_{262}	—	October 13, 2006	Kitt Peak	Spacewatch	MAR	670 m	MPC · JPL
570689	2006 UH_{267}	—	October 19, 2006	Kitt Peak	Spacewatch	·	2.3 km	MPC · JPL
570690	2006 UN_{270}	—	October 27, 2006	Mount Lemmon	Mount Lemmon Survey	·	3.1 km	MPC · JPL
570691	2006 UC_{276}	—	September 18, 2006	Kitt Peak	Spacewatch	·	860 m	MPC · JPL
570692	2006 UT_{278}	—	September 26, 2006	Mount Lemmon	Mount Lemmon Survey	·	2.1 km	MPC · JPL
570693	2006 UL_{279}	—	October 16, 2006	Kitt Peak	Spacewatch	KOR	1.3 km	MPC · JPL
570694	2006 UU_{279}	—	October 28, 2006	Mount Lemmon	Mount Lemmon Survey	EOS	1.7 km	MPC · JPL
570695	2006 UE_{281}	—	October 16, 2006	Kitt Peak	Spacewatch	·	2.3 km	MPC · JPL
570696	2006 UW_{289}	—	October 31, 2006	Kitt Peak	Spacewatch	(1547)	960 m	MPC · JPL
570697	2006 UY_{291}	—	October 27, 2006	Mount Lemmon	Mount Lemmon Survey	·	1.9 km	MPC · JPL
570698	2006 UZ_{299}	—	October 21, 2006	Mount Lemmon	Mount Lemmon Survey	·	2.8 km	MPC · JPL
570699	2006 UW_{305}	—	October 19, 2006	Kitt Peak	Deep Ecliptic Survey	TEL	850 m	MPC · JPL
570700	2006 UJ_{307}	—	October 19, 2006	Kitt Peak	Deep Ecliptic Survey	·	1.5 km	MPC · JPL

== 570701–570800 ==
back to top

Designation			Discovery			Properties		Ref
Permanent	Provisional	Named after	Date	Site	Discoverer(s)	Category	Diam.	Ref
570701	2006 UQ_{310}	—	September 27, 2006	Kitt Peak	Spacewatch	·	1.5 km	MPC · JPL
570702	2006 UR_{311}	—	October 19, 2006	Kitt Peak	Deep Ecliptic Survey	THM	1.5 km	MPC · JPL
570703	2006 UB_{320}	—	October 19, 2006	Kitt Peak	Deep Ecliptic Survey	·	830 m	MPC · JPL
570704	2006 UL_{324}	—	October 19, 2006	Kitt Peak	Deep Ecliptic Survey	·	1.8 km	MPC · JPL
570705	2006 UO_{332}	—	October 21, 2006	Apache Point	SDSS Collaboration	·	1.7 km	MPC · JPL
570706	2006 UT_{332}	—	October 13, 2006	Apache Point	SDSS Collaboration	·	2.1 km	MPC · JPL
570707	2006 UE_{333}	—	October 13, 2006	Apache Point	SDSS Collaboration	·	1.3 km	MPC · JPL
570708	2006 UF_{333}	—	September 28, 2006	Kitt Peak	Spacewatch	·	2.4 km	MPC · JPL
570709	2006 UT_{333}	—	October 11, 2006	Apache Point	SDSS Collaboration	·	2.2 km	MPC · JPL
570710	2006 UA_{340}	—	November 1, 2006	Kitt Peak	Spacewatch	EOS	1.9 km	MPC · JPL
570711	2006 UA_{351}	—	October 20, 2006	Kitt Peak	Spacewatch	·	1.5 km	MPC · JPL
570712	2006 UV_{353}	—	October 27, 2006	Mount Lemmon	Mount Lemmon Survey	·	1.8 km	MPC · JPL
570713	2006 UV_{354}	—	November 1, 2006	Kitt Peak	Spacewatch	·	2.1 km	MPC · JPL
570714	2006 UG_{358}	—	October 2, 2006	Kitt Peak	Spacewatch	·	1.9 km	MPC · JPL
570715	2006 UM_{359}	—	October 21, 2006	Kitt Peak	Spacewatch	(2076)	420 m	MPC · JPL
570716	2006 UZ_{365}	—	October 28, 2006	Catalina	CSS	·	3.0 km	MPC · JPL
570717	2006 UC_{366}	—	February 3, 2012	Haleakala	Pan-STARRS 1	·	1.1 km	MPC · JPL
570718	2006 UD_{366}	—	October 18, 2006	Kitt Peak	Spacewatch	·	2.4 km	MPC · JPL
570719	2006 UX_{366}	—	October 23, 2012	Mount Lemmon	Mount Lemmon Survey	·	2.8 km	MPC · JPL
570720	2006 UF_{367}	—	October 21, 2006	Kitt Peak	Spacewatch	·	2.4 km	MPC · JPL
570721	2006 UH_{367}	—	October 23, 2006	Kitt Peak	Spacewatch	·	2.2 km	MPC · JPL
570722	2006 US_{367}	—	May 28, 2009	Mount Lemmon	Mount Lemmon Survey	MAS	610 m	MPC · JPL
570723	2006 UT_{367}	—	October 20, 2006	Kitt Peak	Deep Ecliptic Survey	·	2.3 km	MPC · JPL
570724	2006 UV_{367}	—	September 4, 2011	Haleakala	Pan-STARRS 1	·	1.7 km	MPC · JPL
570725	2006 UD_{374}	—	February 28, 2014	Haleakala	Pan-STARRS 1	·	2.4 km	MPC · JPL
570726	2006 UE_{374}	—	December 20, 2007	Kitt Peak	Spacewatch	THM	2.1 km	MPC · JPL
570727	2006 UN_{374}	—	October 19, 2006	Mount Lemmon	Mount Lemmon Survey	·	2.3 km	MPC · JPL
570728	2006 UX_{374}	—	October 17, 2006	Kitt Peak	Spacewatch	·	520 m	MPC · JPL
570729	2006 UK_{375}	—	September 21, 2011	Mount Lemmon	Mount Lemmon Survey	·	2.1 km	MPC · JPL
570730	2006 UW_{375}	—	October 20, 2006	Kitt Peak	Spacewatch	·	2.7 km	MPC · JPL
570731	2006 UB_{377}	—	October 23, 2006	Kitt Peak	Spacewatch	·	1.9 km	MPC · JPL
570732	2006 UJ_{377}	—	August 25, 2011	Haleakala	Haleakala	·	1.7 km	MPC · JPL
570733	2006 UL_{377}	—	September 26, 2011	Haleakala	Pan-STARRS 1	·	2.0 km	MPC · JPL
570734	2006 UP_{377}	—	January 13, 2008	Kitt Peak	Spacewatch	·	2.1 km	MPC · JPL
570735	2006 UD_{378}	—	October 16, 2006	Kitt Peak	Spacewatch	EOS	1.4 km	MPC · JPL
570736	2006 UM_{379}	—	August 4, 2013	Haleakala	Pan-STARRS 1	·	870 m	MPC · JPL
570737	2006 UQ_{382}	—	October 19, 2006	Mount Lemmon	Mount Lemmon Survey	·	890 m	MPC · JPL
570738	2006 UV_{382}	—	October 31, 2006	Mount Lemmon	Mount Lemmon Survey	T_{j} (2.95)	3.8 km	MPC · JPL
570739	2006 UY_{382}	—	October 27, 2006	Mount Lemmon	Mount Lemmon Survey	·	2.5 km	MPC · JPL
570740	2006 US_{383}	—	October 22, 2006	Kitt Peak	Spacewatch	·	650 m	MPC · JPL
570741	2006 UV_{383}	—	October 19, 2006	Kitt Peak	Spacewatch	·	1.7 km	MPC · JPL
570742	2006 US_{384}	—	October 31, 2006	Kitt Peak	Spacewatch	·	2.2 km	MPC · JPL
570743	2006 UF_{385}	—	October 24, 1995	Kitt Peak	Spacewatch	·	1.8 km	MPC · JPL
570744	2006 UZ_{386}	—	October 22, 2006	Kitt Peak	Spacewatch	EOS	1.3 km	MPC · JPL
570745	2006 UH_{387}	—	October 20, 2006	Kitt Peak	Spacewatch	·	1.6 km	MPC · JPL
570746	2006 UF_{388}	—	October 27, 2006	Mount Lemmon	Mount Lemmon Survey	LIX	2.9 km	MPC · JPL
570747	2006 UP_{388}	—	October 20, 2006	Kitt Peak	Spacewatch	AST	1.5 km	MPC · JPL
570748	2006 VL_{12}	—	November 11, 2006	Kitt Peak	Spacewatch	·	1.6 km	MPC · JPL
570749	2006 VO_{20}	—	October 31, 2006	Mount Lemmon	Mount Lemmon Survey	EOS	1.7 km	MPC · JPL
570750	2006 VT_{20}	—	October 31, 2006	Mount Lemmon	Mount Lemmon Survey	·	2.3 km	MPC · JPL
570751	2006 VT_{30}	—	October 20, 2006	Mount Lemmon	Mount Lemmon Survey	·	2.8 km	MPC · JPL
570752	2006 VC_{35}	—	November 11, 2006	Mount Lemmon	Mount Lemmon Survey	·	2.4 km	MPC · JPL
570753	2006 VG_{40}	—	April 24, 2003	Kitt Peak	Spacewatch	·	2.6 km	MPC · JPL
570754	2006 VL_{40}	—	November 12, 2006	Mount Lemmon	Mount Lemmon Survey	·	1.9 km	MPC · JPL
570755	2006 VM_{42}	—	November 12, 2006	Mount Lemmon	Mount Lemmon Survey	·	1.9 km	MPC · JPL
570756	2006 VR_{44}	—	November 12, 2006	Mount Lemmon	Mount Lemmon Survey	EOS	1.7 km	MPC · JPL
570757	2006 VZ_{44}	—	October 29, 2006	Catalina	CSS	H	620 m	MPC · JPL
570758	2006 VP_{46}	—	August 20, 2000	Kitt Peak	Spacewatch	·	2.0 km	MPC · JPL
570759	2006 VQ_{46}	—	November 9, 2006	Kitt Peak	Spacewatch	·	2.5 km	MPC · JPL
570760	2006 VG_{47}	—	October 19, 2006	Mount Lemmon	Mount Lemmon Survey	·	2.5 km	MPC · JPL
570761	2006 VT_{58}	—	October 22, 2006	Mount Lemmon	Mount Lemmon Survey	·	1.4 km	MPC · JPL
570762	2006 VY_{77}	—	November 12, 2006	Mount Lemmon	Mount Lemmon Survey	EOS	2.0 km	MPC · JPL
570763	2006 VX_{79}	—	November 12, 2006	Mount Lemmon	Mount Lemmon Survey	NYS	1.0 km	MPC · JPL
570764	2006 VT_{85}	—	October 27, 2006	Mount Lemmon	Mount Lemmon Survey	·	2.2 km	MPC · JPL
570765	2006 VU_{87}	—	October 13, 2006	Kitt Peak	Spacewatch	·	2.3 km	MPC · JPL
570766	2006 VV_{87}	—	October 19, 2006	Mount Lemmon	Mount Lemmon Survey	·	1.8 km	MPC · JPL
570767	2006 VE_{89}	—	November 14, 2006	Kitt Peak	Spacewatch	H	500 m	MPC · JPL
570768	2006 VN_{89}	—	October 28, 2006	Mount Lemmon	Mount Lemmon Survey	·	2.0 km	MPC · JPL
570769	2006 VR_{89}	—	November 14, 2006	Kitt Peak	Spacewatch	·	730 m	MPC · JPL
570770	2006 VL_{90}	—	October 19, 2006	Kitt Peak	Spacewatch	HYG	2.9 km	MPC · JPL
570771	2006 VX_{96}	—	November 10, 2006	Kitt Peak	Spacewatch	HNS	1.1 km	MPC · JPL
570772	2006 VC_{98}	—	November 11, 2006	Kitt Peak	Spacewatch	(5)	750 m	MPC · JPL
570773	2006 VW_{98}	—	October 20, 2006	Kitt Peak	Spacewatch	·	1.8 km	MPC · JPL
570774	2006 VW_{101}	—	October 22, 2006	Mount Lemmon	Mount Lemmon Survey	·	2.7 km	MPC · JPL
570775	2006 VS_{103}	—	November 12, 2006	Lulin	LUSS	·	1.6 km	MPC · JPL
570776	2006 VG_{109}	—	October 20, 2006	Mount Lemmon	Mount Lemmon Survey	·	2.9 km	MPC · JPL
570777	2006 VF_{114}	—	November 14, 2006	Mount Lemmon	Mount Lemmon Survey	·	2.7 km	MPC · JPL
570778	2006 VK_{115}	—	October 23, 2006	Kitt Peak	Spacewatch	·	1.4 km	MPC · JPL
570779	2006 VU_{119}	—	September 28, 2006	Mount Lemmon	Mount Lemmon Survey	NYS	880 m	MPC · JPL
570780	2006 VP_{122}	—	November 14, 2006	Kitt Peak	Spacewatch	EOS	2.3 km	MPC · JPL
570781	2006 VQ_{125}	—	October 20, 2006	Mount Lemmon	Mount Lemmon Survey	EOS	1.5 km	MPC · JPL
570782	2006 VC_{127}	—	November 15, 2006	Kitt Peak	Spacewatch	·	2.3 km	MPC · JPL
570783	2006 VX_{127}	—	November 15, 2006	Kitt Peak	Spacewatch	·	1.1 km	MPC · JPL
570784	2006 VG_{131}	—	November 15, 2006	Kitt Peak	Spacewatch	·	2.5 km	MPC · JPL
570785	2006 VZ_{133}	—	November 15, 2006	Mount Lemmon	Mount Lemmon Survey	·	1.4 km	MPC · JPL
570786	2006 VD_{136}	—	October 20, 2006	Mount Lemmon	Mount Lemmon Survey	·	940 m	MPC · JPL
570787	2006 VT_{136}	—	November 15, 2006	Kitt Peak	Spacewatch	·	1.9 km	MPC · JPL
570788	2006 VA_{139}	—	November 15, 2006	Mount Lemmon	Mount Lemmon Survey	H	490 m	MPC · JPL
570789	2006 VR_{148}	—	August 6, 2005	Palomar	NEAT	T_{j} (2.98) · 3:2	5.4 km	MPC · JPL
570790	2006 VH_{151}	—	November 11, 2006	Catalina	CSS	·	950 m	MPC · JPL
570791	2006 VW_{172}	—	November 1, 2006	Kitt Peak	Spacewatch	·	860 m	MPC · JPL
570792	2006 VZ_{172}	—	November 1, 2006	Kitt Peak	Spacewatch	EOS	1.5 km	MPC · JPL
570793	2006 VZ_{174}	—	November 1, 2006	Mount Lemmon	Mount Lemmon Survey	·	1.7 km	MPC · JPL
570794	2006 VC_{175}	—	November 1, 2006	Mount Lemmon	Mount Lemmon Survey	·	2.2 km	MPC · JPL
570795	2006 VA_{176}	—	November 13, 2006	Kitt Peak	Spacewatch	·	3.3 km	MPC · JPL
570796	2006 VG_{176}	—	November 1, 2006	Kitt Peak	Spacewatch	·	2.6 km	MPC · JPL
570797	2006 VH_{176}	—	November 14, 2006	Mount Lemmon	Mount Lemmon Survey	·	2.7 km	MPC · JPL
570798	2006 VL_{176}	—	November 1, 2006	Kitt Peak	Spacewatch	EOS	1.6 km	MPC · JPL
570799	2006 VT_{176}	—	October 20, 2017	Mount Lemmon	Mount Lemmon Survey	·	2.7 km	MPC · JPL
570800	2006 VY_{176}	—	November 11, 2006	Kitt Peak	Spacewatch	EOS	1.6 km	MPC · JPL

== 570801–570900 ==
back to top

Designation			Discovery			Properties		Ref
Permanent	Provisional	Named after	Date	Site	Discoverer(s)	Category	Diam.	Ref
570801	2006 VM_{177}	—	September 28, 2011	Kitt Peak	Spacewatch	EOS	1.7 km	MPC · JPL
570802	2006 VN_{177}	—	October 19, 2010	Mount Lemmon	Mount Lemmon Survey	·	830 m	MPC · JPL
570803	2006 VQ_{178}	—	December 8, 2012	Mount Lemmon	Mount Lemmon Survey	·	2.4 km	MPC · JPL
570804	2006 VZ_{178}	—	April 2, 2009	Mount Lemmon	Mount Lemmon Survey	·	2.8 km	MPC · JPL
570805	2006 VE_{179}	—	November 23, 2014	Mount Lemmon	Mount Lemmon Survey	·	1.4 km	MPC · JPL
570806	2006 VK_{179}	—	November 11, 2006	Mount Lemmon	Mount Lemmon Survey	·	2.5 km	MPC · JPL
570807	2006 VN_{179}	—	September 26, 2014	Mount Lemmon	Mount Lemmon Survey	·	1.0 km	MPC · JPL
570808	2006 VP_{179}	—	October 31, 2006	Kitt Peak	Spacewatch	EOS	1.4 km	MPC · JPL
570809	2006 VK_{180}	—	July 11, 2016	Haleakala	Pan-STARRS 1	EOS	1.6 km	MPC · JPL
570810	2006 VX_{180}	—	November 14, 2006	Kitt Peak	Spacewatch	·	2.4 km	MPC · JPL
570811	2006 VP_{181}	—	September 10, 2013	Haleakala	Pan-STARRS 1	·	880 m	MPC · JPL
570812	2006 VG_{183}	—	November 12, 2006	Mount Lemmon	Mount Lemmon Survey	·	2.2 km	MPC · JPL
570813	2006 WS	—	October 20, 2006	Mount Lemmon	Mount Lemmon Survey	H	540 m	MPC · JPL
570814 Nauru	2006 WY	Nauru	November 18, 2006	Nogales	J.-C. Merlin	NYS	850 m	MPC · JPL
570815	2006 WL_{2}	—	November 16, 2006	Mount Lemmon	Mount Lemmon Survey	H	510 m	MPC · JPL
570816	2006 WW_{2}	—	November 20, 2006	7300	W. K. Y. Yeung	·	1.6 km	MPC · JPL
570817	2006 WX_{6}	—	November 16, 2006	Kitt Peak	Spacewatch	·	1.4 km	MPC · JPL
570818	2006 WP_{8}	—	November 16, 2006	Kitt Peak	Spacewatch	EMA	3.1 km	MPC · JPL
570819	2006 WJ_{12}	—	October 28, 1998	Kitt Peak	Spacewatch	·	1.3 km	MPC · JPL
570820	2006 WC_{15}	—	October 20, 2006	Mount Lemmon	Mount Lemmon Survey	·	1.7 km	MPC · JPL
570821	2006 WR_{15}	—	November 17, 2006	Kitt Peak	Spacewatch	·	2.2 km	MPC · JPL
570822	2006 WC_{18}	—	November 17, 2006	Mount Lemmon	Mount Lemmon Survey	EOS	1.6 km	MPC · JPL
570823	2006 WT_{19}	—	October 22, 2006	Kitt Peak	Spacewatch	·	1.8 km	MPC · JPL
570824	2006 WE_{22}	—	November 17, 2006	Mount Lemmon	Mount Lemmon Survey	·	2.9 km	MPC · JPL
570825	2006 WL_{28}	—	November 1, 2006	Mount Lemmon	Mount Lemmon Survey	H	440 m	MPC · JPL
570826	2006 WO_{32}	—	November 16, 2006	Kitt Peak	Spacewatch	·	2.0 km	MPC · JPL
570827	2006 WC_{34}	—	November 12, 2006	Mount Lemmon	Mount Lemmon Survey	·	2.7 km	MPC · JPL
570828	2006 WP_{35}	—	November 16, 2006	Kitt Peak	Spacewatch	·	2.7 km	MPC · JPL
570829	2006 WQ_{36}	—	November 16, 2006	Kitt Peak	Spacewatch	·	2.5 km	MPC · JPL
570830	2006 WV_{43}	—	October 19, 2006	Mount Lemmon	Mount Lemmon Survey	·	2.2 km	MPC · JPL
570831	2006 WR_{47}	—	November 16, 2006	Kitt Peak	Spacewatch	NYS	1.2 km	MPC · JPL
570832	2006 WU_{47}	—	November 16, 2006	Kitt Peak	Spacewatch	·	1.5 km	MPC · JPL
570833	2006 WG_{50}	—	November 16, 2006	Mount Lemmon	Mount Lemmon Survey	(5)	1.0 km	MPC · JPL
570834	2006 WD_{51}	—	November 16, 2006	Mount Lemmon	Mount Lemmon Survey	·	2.7 km	MPC · JPL
570835	2006 WD_{54}	—	May 10, 2005	Cerro Tololo	Deep Ecliptic Survey	NYS	1.0 km	MPC · JPL
570836	2006 WF_{54}	—	March 24, 2003	Kitt Peak	Spacewatch	EOS	2.2 km	MPC · JPL
570837	2006 WB_{55}	—	November 16, 2006	Kitt Peak	Spacewatch	EOS	1.7 km	MPC · JPL
570838	2006 WN_{58}	—	November 17, 2006	Kitt Peak	Spacewatch	·	2.8 km	MPC · JPL
570839	2006 WT_{62}	—	November 17, 2006	Mount Lemmon	Mount Lemmon Survey	·	660 m	MPC · JPL
570840	2006 WT_{63}	—	November 17, 2006	Mount Lemmon	Mount Lemmon Survey	·	590 m	MPC · JPL
570841	2006 WM_{65}	—	September 30, 2006	Mount Lemmon	Mount Lemmon Survey	·	520 m	MPC · JPL
570842	2006 WF_{67}	—	November 17, 2006	Mount Lemmon	Mount Lemmon Survey	·	2.6 km	MPC · JPL
570843	2006 WZ_{68}	—	November 17, 2006	Mount Lemmon	Mount Lemmon Survey	·	3.2 km	MPC · JPL
570844	2006 WM_{75}	—	November 18, 2006	Kitt Peak	Spacewatch	·	2.7 km	MPC · JPL
570845	2006 WZ_{77}	—	October 27, 2006	Mount Lemmon	Mount Lemmon Survey	·	910 m	MPC · JPL
570846	2006 WV_{78}	—	November 18, 2006	Kitt Peak	Spacewatch	EOS	1.7 km	MPC · JPL
570847	2006 WV_{86}	—	November 18, 2006	Kitt Peak	Spacewatch	·	2.4 km	MPC · JPL
570848	2006 WP_{88}	—	November 18, 2006	Mount Lemmon	Mount Lemmon Survey	·	2.9 km	MPC · JPL
570849	2006 WJ_{90}	—	November 18, 2006	Kitt Peak	Spacewatch	·	3.4 km	MPC · JPL
570850	2006 WX_{90}	—	November 19, 2006	Kitt Peak	Spacewatch	·	1.1 km	MPC · JPL
570851	2006 WM_{91}	—	November 19, 2006	Kitt Peak	Spacewatch	EOS	1.4 km	MPC · JPL
570852	2006 WE_{92}	—	November 19, 2006	Kitt Peak	Spacewatch	EOS	1.7 km	MPC · JPL
570853	2006 WW_{92}	—	November 19, 2006	Kitt Peak	Spacewatch	EOS	1.7 km	MPC · JPL
570854	2006 WP_{103}	—	November 19, 2006	Kitt Peak	Spacewatch	EOS	2.0 km	MPC · JPL
570855	2006 WV_{106}	—	July 16, 2002	Haleakala	NEAT	·	1.2 km	MPC · JPL
570856	2006 WA_{110}	—	November 19, 2006	Kitt Peak	Spacewatch	LIX	3.7 km	MPC · JPL
570857	2006 WA_{117}	—	November 20, 2006	Mount Lemmon	Mount Lemmon Survey	·	1.5 km	MPC · JPL
570858	2006 WM_{117}	—	October 20, 2006	Mount Lemmon	Mount Lemmon Survey	·	1.4 km	MPC · JPL
570859	2006 WU_{121}	—	November 21, 2006	Mount Lemmon	Mount Lemmon Survey	·	1.1 km	MPC · JPL
570860	2006 WQ_{122}	—	November 21, 2006	Mount Lemmon	Mount Lemmon Survey	·	1.9 km	MPC · JPL
570861	2006 WS_{125}	—	November 22, 2006	Mount Lemmon	Mount Lemmon Survey	·	2.5 km	MPC · JPL
570862	2006 WC_{126}	—	November 22, 2006	Mount Lemmon	Mount Lemmon Survey	·	2.4 km	MPC · JPL
570863	2006 WK_{131}	—	September 28, 2006	Apache Point	SDSS Collaboration	·	2.1 km	MPC · JPL
570864	2006 WP_{131}	—	October 19, 2006	Mount Lemmon	Mount Lemmon Survey	·	1.8 km	MPC · JPL
570865	2006 WK_{134}	—	November 18, 2006	Mount Lemmon	Mount Lemmon Survey	·	1.9 km	MPC · JPL
570866	2006 WL_{140}	—	November 19, 2006	Kitt Peak	Spacewatch	H	580 m	MPC · JPL
570867	2006 WU_{141}	—	November 20, 2006	Kitt Peak	Spacewatch	EOS	1.8 km	MPC · JPL
570868	2006 WS_{143}	—	October 31, 2006	Mount Lemmon	Mount Lemmon Survey	·	1.6 km	MPC · JPL
570869	2006 WL_{147}	—	November 20, 2006	Kitt Peak	Spacewatch	THM	2.1 km	MPC · JPL
570870	2006 WV_{150}	—	November 20, 2006	Mount Lemmon	Mount Lemmon Survey	·	3.1 km	MPC · JPL
570871	2006 WE_{152}	—	November 16, 2006	Kitt Peak	Spacewatch	·	3.0 km	MPC · JPL
570872	2006 WO_{154}	—	November 22, 2006	Kitt Peak	Spacewatch	EUN	1.0 km	MPC · JPL
570873	2006 WO_{155}	—	November 22, 2006	Kitt Peak	Spacewatch	EOS	1.3 km	MPC · JPL
570874	2006 WU_{158}	—	November 22, 2006	Mount Lemmon	Mount Lemmon Survey	·	1.2 km	MPC · JPL
570875	2006 WT_{159}	—	November 22, 2006	Kitt Peak	Spacewatch	·	1.1 km	MPC · JPL
570876	2006 WD_{161}	—	September 28, 2006	Mount Lemmon	Mount Lemmon Survey	·	2.5 km	MPC · JPL
570877	2006 WR_{163}	—	October 31, 2006	Mount Lemmon	Mount Lemmon Survey	·	490 m	MPC · JPL
570878	2006 WU_{165}	—	November 11, 2006	Kitt Peak	Spacewatch	EOS	1.9 km	MPC · JPL
570879	2006 WH_{169}	—	November 23, 2006	Kitt Peak	Spacewatch	THM	2.5 km	MPC · JPL
570880	2006 WL_{175}	—	November 23, 2006	Kitt Peak	Spacewatch	·	860 m	MPC · JPL
570881	2006 WZ_{177}	—	November 23, 2006	Mount Lemmon	Mount Lemmon Survey	·	2.9 km	MPC · JPL
570882	2006 WS_{180}	—	November 24, 2006	Mount Lemmon	Mount Lemmon Survey	(1118)	3.0 km	MPC · JPL
570883	2006 WK_{181}	—	October 21, 2006	Lulin	LUSS	EOS	2.4 km	MPC · JPL
570884	2006 WE_{191}	—	June 17, 2005	Mount Lemmon	Mount Lemmon Survey	HYG	3.3 km	MPC · JPL
570885	2006 WK_{194}	—	November 27, 2006	Kitt Peak	Spacewatch	EOS	1.7 km	MPC · JPL
570886	2006 WC_{196}	—	March 12, 2004	Palomar	NEAT	·	820 m	MPC · JPL
570887	2006 WG_{207}	—	February 14, 2012	Haleakala	Pan-STARRS 1	·	1.2 km	MPC · JPL
570888	2006 WQ_{207}	—	November 22, 2006	Kitt Peak	Spacewatch	H	430 m	MPC · JPL
570889	2006 WK_{209}	—	November 23, 2006	Catalina	CSS	·	720 m	MPC · JPL
570890	2006 WF_{210}	—	December 31, 2007	Mount Lemmon	Mount Lemmon Survey	·	2.5 km	MPC · JPL
570891	2006 WG_{210}	—	September 26, 2011	Mount Lemmon	Mount Lemmon Survey	·	2.6 km	MPC · JPL
570892	2006 WJ_{210}	—	November 18, 2006	Kitt Peak	Spacewatch	·	2.1 km	MPC · JPL
570893	2006 WN_{210}	—	October 24, 2011	Haleakala	Pan-STARRS 1	·	2.4 km	MPC · JPL
570894	2006 WR_{210}	—	February 12, 2016	Haleakala	Pan-STARRS 1	·	1.5 km	MPC · JPL
570895	2006 WB_{211}	—	April 23, 2015	Haleakala	Pan-STARRS 1	·	2.4 km	MPC · JPL
570896	2006 WD_{211}	—	October 29, 2010	Mount Lemmon	Mount Lemmon Survey	·	1.2 km	MPC · JPL
570897	2006 WG_{211}	—	October 20, 2012	Mount Lemmon	Mount Lemmon Survey	·	3.2 km	MPC · JPL
570898	2006 WJ_{211}	—	August 10, 2016	Haleakala	Pan-STARRS 1	EOS	2.0 km	MPC · JPL
570899	2006 WR_{211}	—	September 26, 2006	Mount Lemmon	Mount Lemmon Survey	EOS	1.7 km	MPC · JPL
570900	2006 WS_{211}	—	November 22, 2006	Kitt Peak	Spacewatch	·	2.5 km	MPC · JPL

== 570901–571000 ==
back to top

Designation			Discovery			Properties		Ref
Permanent	Provisional	Named after	Date	Site	Discoverer(s)	Category	Diam.	Ref
570901	2006 WL_{212}	—	September 8, 2016	Haleakala	Pan-STARRS 1	·	2.3 km	MPC · JPL
570902	2006 WU_{212}	—	June 8, 2016	Haleakala	Pan-STARRS 1	HYG	2.3 km	MPC · JPL
570903	2006 WP_{213}	—	October 31, 2011	Mount Lemmon	Mount Lemmon Survey	·	2.5 km	MPC · JPL
570904	2006 WU_{213}	—	October 30, 2010	Mount Lemmon	Mount Lemmon Survey	·	880 m	MPC · JPL
570905	2006 WS_{214}	—	November 19, 2006	Kitt Peak	Spacewatch	EOS	1.6 km	MPC · JPL
570906	2006 WG_{215}	—	September 19, 2011	Haleakala	Pan-STARRS 1	·	2.2 km	MPC · JPL
570907	2006 WT_{215}	—	September 25, 1995	Kitt Peak	Spacewatch	·	1.8 km	MPC · JPL
570908	2006 WZ_{215}	—	June 19, 2015	Mount Lemmon	Mount Lemmon Survey	EOS	1.6 km	MPC · JPL
570909	2006 WL_{216}	—	November 17, 2006	Kitt Peak	Spacewatch	EOS	1.5 km	MPC · JPL
570910	2006 WC_{219}	—	March 4, 2008	Catalina	CSS	·	3.0 km	MPC · JPL
570911	2006 WT_{219}	—	September 26, 2011	Haleakala	Pan-STARRS 1	·	1.8 km	MPC · JPL
570912	2006 WR_{220}	—	September 4, 2011	Haleakala	Pan-STARRS 1	EOS	1.4 km	MPC · JPL
570913	2006 WX_{220}	—	November 23, 2006	Kitt Peak	Spacewatch	·	2.7 km	MPC · JPL
570914	2006 WY_{220}	—	November 22, 2006	Mount Lemmon	Mount Lemmon Survey	H	450 m	MPC · JPL
570915	2006 WB_{223}	—	February 28, 2014	Mount Lemmon	Mount Lemmon Survey	·	2.8 km	MPC · JPL
570916	2006 WH_{223}	—	June 15, 2015	Mount Lemmon	Mount Lemmon Survey	·	2.4 km	MPC · JPL
570917	2006 WZ_{223}	—	November 16, 2006	Kitt Peak	Spacewatch	·	2.2 km	MPC · JPL
570918	2006 WM_{225}	—	November 15, 2017	Mount Lemmon	Mount Lemmon Survey	·	2.1 km	MPC · JPL
570919	2006 WQ_{225}	—	January 27, 2017	Haleakala	Pan-STARRS 1	3:2	4.9 km	MPC · JPL
570920	2006 WY_{225}	—	November 25, 2006	Kitt Peak	Spacewatch	·	3.1 km	MPC · JPL
570921	2006 WD_{226}	—	November 16, 1995	Kitt Peak	Spacewatch	·	2.8 km	MPC · JPL
570922	2006 WN_{226}	—	June 13, 2015	Haleakala	Pan-STARRS 1	·	2.8 km	MPC · JPL
570923	2006 WU_{226}	—	January 12, 2008	Kitt Peak	Spacewatch	·	1.6 km	MPC · JPL
570924	2006 WF_{227}	—	November 24, 2006	Kitt Peak	Spacewatch	·	2.0 km	MPC · JPL
570925	2006 WA_{228}	—	April 25, 2015	Haleakala	Pan-STARRS 1	·	2.2 km	MPC · JPL
570926	2006 WO_{229}	—	November 27, 2006	Kitt Peak	Spacewatch	·	1.7 km	MPC · JPL
570927	2006 WM_{230}	—	November 23, 2006	Kitt Peak	Spacewatch	EOS	1.7 km	MPC · JPL
570928	2006 WA_{231}	—	November 22, 2006	Kitt Peak	Spacewatch	·	2.9 km	MPC · JPL
570929	2006 WR_{231}	—	November 25, 2006	Kitt Peak	Spacewatch	·	2.8 km	MPC · JPL
570930	2006 WT_{231}	—	November 17, 2006	Mount Lemmon	Mount Lemmon Survey	EOS	1.7 km	MPC · JPL
570931	2006 WD_{232}	—	November 21, 2006	Mount Lemmon	Mount Lemmon Survey	·	2.2 km	MPC · JPL
570932	2006 WX_{232}	—	November 22, 2006	Kitt Peak	Spacewatch	·	1.4 km	MPC · JPL
570933	2006 XR_{1}	—	November 22, 2006	Kitt Peak	Spacewatch	MAR	810 m	MPC · JPL
570934	2006 XT_{6}	—	December 9, 2006	Kitt Peak	Spacewatch	·	1.2 km	MPC · JPL
570935	2006 XV_{8}	—	December 9, 2006	Kitt Peak	Spacewatch	·	2.8 km	MPC · JPL
570936	2006 XU_{9}	—	December 9, 2006	Kitt Peak	Spacewatch	·	2.7 km	MPC · JPL
570937	2006 XH_{11}	—	October 31, 2006	Mount Lemmon	Mount Lemmon Survey	·	890 m	MPC · JPL
570938	2006 XE_{14}	—	December 10, 2006	Kitt Peak	Spacewatch	NYS	1.1 km	MPC · JPL
570939	2006 XP_{18}	—	May 29, 2005	Siding Spring	SSS	·	1.6 km	MPC · JPL
570940	2006 XW_{23}	—	December 12, 2006	Mount Lemmon	Mount Lemmon Survey	EOS	1.7 km	MPC · JPL
570941	2006 XX_{23}	—	December 12, 2006	Mount Lemmon	Mount Lemmon Survey	EMA	2.5 km	MPC · JPL
570942	2006 XH_{28}	—	November 16, 2006	Lulin	LUSS	H	480 m	MPC · JPL
570943	2006 XK_{30}	—	December 13, 2006	Kitt Peak	Spacewatch	·	2.7 km	MPC · JPL
570944	2006 XV_{30}	—	November 23, 2006	Kitt Peak	Spacewatch	·	1.4 km	MPC · JPL
570945	2006 XT_{31}	—	October 13, 2006	Kitt Peak	Spacewatch	·	1.6 km	MPC · JPL
570946	2006 XS_{35}	—	December 11, 2006	Kitt Peak	Spacewatch	PHO	1.1 km	MPC · JPL
570947	2006 XQ_{39}	—	September 30, 2006	Mount Lemmon	Mount Lemmon Survey	·	2.1 km	MPC · JPL
570948	2006 XS_{39}	—	November 17, 2006	Kitt Peak	Spacewatch	·	1.4 km	MPC · JPL
570949	2006 XA_{40}	—	December 12, 2006	Kitt Peak	Spacewatch	·	2.3 km	MPC · JPL
570950	2006 XG_{40}	—	November 22, 2006	Kitt Peak	Spacewatch	·	1.1 km	MPC · JPL
570951	2006 XB_{41}	—	December 12, 2006	Mount Lemmon	Mount Lemmon Survey	·	1.1 km	MPC · JPL
570952	2006 XN_{41}	—	December 12, 2006	Mount Lemmon	Mount Lemmon Survey	·	2.7 km	MPC · JPL
570953	2006 XO_{41}	—	December 1, 2006	Mount Lemmon	Mount Lemmon Survey	·	950 m	MPC · JPL
570954	2006 XO_{48}	—	December 13, 2006	Mount Lemmon	Mount Lemmon Survey	HYG	2.7 km	MPC · JPL
570955	2006 XG_{49}	—	August 27, 2005	Palomar	NEAT	·	2.8 km	MPC · JPL
570956	2006 XV_{49}	—	December 13, 2006	Mount Lemmon	Mount Lemmon Survey	EOS	2.2 km	MPC · JPL
570957	2006 XV_{66}	—	December 20, 2006	Palomar	NEAT	·	1.2 km	MPC · JPL
570958	2006 XZ_{74}	—	October 24, 2011	Kitt Peak	Spacewatch	·	2.4 km	MPC · JPL
570959	2006 XE_{75}	—	December 11, 2006	Kitt Peak	Spacewatch	·	2.6 km	MPC · JPL
570960	2006 XQ_{75}	—	November 27, 2006	Kitt Peak	Spacewatch	·	2.3 km	MPC · JPL
570961	2006 XH_{76}	—	October 31, 2006	Kitt Peak	Spacewatch	·	2.3 km	MPC · JPL
570962	2006 XN_{77}	—	December 14, 2006	Mount Lemmon	Mount Lemmon Survey	·	3.1 km	MPC · JPL
570963	2006 XQ_{77}	—	November 25, 2006	Kitt Peak	Spacewatch	·	2.8 km	MPC · JPL
570964	2006 XU_{77}	—	September 26, 2017	Haleakala	Pan-STARRS 1	·	2.4 km	MPC · JPL
570965	2006 XH_{78}	—	January 20, 2013	Kitt Peak	Spacewatch	·	3.1 km	MPC · JPL
570966	2006 XL_{78}	—	April 20, 2014	Mount Lemmon	Mount Lemmon Survey	·	2.2 km	MPC · JPL
570967	2006 XO_{78}	—	November 19, 2006	Kitt Peak	Spacewatch	·	930 m	MPC · JPL
570968	2006 XQ_{79}	—	December 9, 2006	Kitt Peak	Spacewatch	·	2.9 km	MPC · JPL
570969	2006 XN_{80}	—	December 13, 2006	Kitt Peak	Spacewatch	·	2.2 km	MPC · JPL
570970	2006 XV_{80}	—	December 10, 2006	Kitt Peak	Spacewatch	·	2.5 km	MPC · JPL
570971	2006 XW_{80}	—	December 14, 2006	Kitt Peak	Spacewatch	(31811)	2.7 km	MPC · JPL
570972	2006 XZ_{80}	—	December 1, 2006	Mount Lemmon	Mount Lemmon Survey	·	2.5 km	MPC · JPL
570973	2006 XA_{81}	—	December 15, 2006	Kitt Peak	Spacewatch	·	2.6 km	MPC · JPL
570974	2006 XD_{81}	—	December 15, 2006	Kitt Peak	Spacewatch	·	2.0 km	MPC · JPL
570975	2006 XK_{81}	—	December 13, 2006	Kitt Peak	Spacewatch	HNS	990 m	MPC · JPL
570976	2006 YT_{3}	—	December 16, 2006	Mount Lemmon	Mount Lemmon Survey	·	1.1 km	MPC · JPL
570977	2006 YC_{5}	—	November 12, 2006	Mount Lemmon	Mount Lemmon Survey	·	3.0 km	MPC · JPL
570978	2006 YX_{7}	—	December 12, 2006	Socorro	LINEAR	·	4.1 km	MPC · JPL
570979	2006 YG_{9}	—	December 20, 2006	Mount Lemmon	Mount Lemmon Survey	·	1.5 km	MPC · JPL
570980	2006 YN_{9}	—	December 13, 2006	Kitt Peak	Spacewatch	·	2.9 km	MPC · JPL
570981	2006 YQ_{16}	—	December 12, 2006	Mount Lemmon	Mount Lemmon Survey	EOS	1.8 km	MPC · JPL
570982	2006 YZ_{22}	—	January 28, 2003	Apache Point	SDSS Collaboration	·	1.0 km	MPC · JPL
570983	2006 YZ_{24}	—	January 13, 1996	Kitt Peak	Spacewatch	EOS	1.9 km	MPC · JPL
570984	2006 YS_{26}	—	December 21, 2006	Kitt Peak	Spacewatch	·	920 m	MPC · JPL
570985	2006 YD_{27}	—	December 21, 2006	Kitt Peak	Spacewatch	EOS	2.4 km	MPC · JPL
570986	2006 YG_{27}	—	December 21, 2006	Kitt Peak	Spacewatch	·	870 m	MPC · JPL
570987	2006 YV_{31}	—	December 21, 2006	Mount Lemmon	Mount Lemmon Survey	·	2.3 km	MPC · JPL
570988	2006 YH_{32}	—	December 21, 2006	Kitt Peak	Spacewatch	·	3.0 km	MPC · JPL
570989	2006 YZ_{33}	—	December 21, 2006	Kitt Peak	Spacewatch	·	1.5 km	MPC · JPL
570990	2006 YX_{36}	—	December 21, 2006	Kitt Peak	Spacewatch	·	2.4 km	MPC · JPL
570991	2006 YS_{38}	—	December 21, 2006	Kitt Peak	Spacewatch	(5)	1.2 km	MPC · JPL
570992	2006 YD_{39}	—	December 21, 2006	Kitt Peak	Spacewatch	·	2.9 km	MPC · JPL
570993	2006 YT_{40}	—	November 22, 2006	Kitt Peak	Spacewatch	·	1.4 km	MPC · JPL
570994	2006 YJ_{41}	—	December 13, 2006	Socorro	LINEAR	·	1.2 km	MPC · JPL
570995	2006 YR_{43}	—	December 14, 2006	Kitt Peak	Spacewatch	·	1.3 km	MPC · JPL
570996	2006 YF_{44}	—	November 21, 2006	Mount Lemmon	Mount Lemmon Survey	MAR	1.0 km	MPC · JPL
570997	2006 YH_{44}	—	December 25, 2006	Kitt Peak	Spacewatch	·	2.9 km	MPC · JPL
570998	2006 YR_{44}	—	July 3, 2005	Mount Lemmon	Mount Lemmon Survey	·	670 m	MPC · JPL
570999	2006 YL_{47}	—	November 17, 2006	Kitt Peak	Spacewatch	·	1.2 km	MPC · JPL
571000 Kowright	2006 YG_{49}	Kowright	December 26, 2006	Mauna Kea	D. D. Balam, K. M. Perrett	·	2.3 km	MPC · JPL

back to top

== Meaning of names ==
As minor planet discoveries are confirmed, they are given a permanent number by the IAU's Minor Planet Center (MPC), and the discoverers can then submit names for them, following the IAU's naming conventions. The list below concerns those minor planets in the specified number-range that have received names, and explains the meanings of those names.

Official naming citations of newly named small Solar System bodies are approved and published in a bulletin by IAU's Working Group for Small Bodies Nomenclature (WGSBN). Before May 2021, citations were published in MPC's Minor Planet Circulars for many decades. Recent citations can also be found on the JPL Small-Body Database (SBDB). Until his death in 2016, German astronomer Lutz D. Schmadel compiled these citations into the Dictionary of Minor Planet Names (DMP) and regularly updated the collection.

Based on Paul Herget's The Names of the Minor Planets, Schmadel also researched the unclear origin of numerous asteroids, most of which had been named prior to World War II. This article incorporates text from this source, which is in the public domain: SBDB New namings may only be added to this list below after official publication as the preannouncement of names is condemned. The WGSBN publishes a comprehensive guideline for the naming rules of non-cometary small Solar System bodies.

Named minor planet	Provisional	This minor planet was named for...	Ref · Catalog
570448 Travismetcalfe	2006 RX_{112}	Travis Metcalfe, American astrophysicist.	IAU · 570448
570814 Nauru	2006 WY	Nauru, an island country and microstate in Oceania, in the Central Pacific, officially the Republic of Naoero and formerly Pleasant Island. With an area of only 21 km^{2} (8.1 sq mi), Nauru is the third-smallest country in the world behind Vatican City and Monaco.	IAU · 570814
571000 Kowright	2006 YG_{49}	Kenneth O. Wright, Canadian Director of the Dominion Astrophysical Observatory of the National Research Council of Canada until 1976, having joined the observatory staff in 1936.	IAU · 571000
