= List of minor planets: 569001–570000 =

The following is a partial list of minor planets, running from minor-planet number 569001 through 570000, inclusive. The primary data for this and other partial lists is based on JPL's "Small-Body Orbital Elements" and data available from the Minor Planet Center. Critical list information is also provided by the MPC, unless otherwise specified from Lowell Observatory. A detailed description of the table's columns and additional sources are given on the main page including a complete list of every page in this series, and a statistical break-up on the dynamical classification of minor planets.

Also see the summary list of all named bodies in numerical and alphabetical order, and the corresponding naming citations for the number range of this particular list. New namings may only be added to this list after official publication, as the preannouncement of names is condemned by the Working Group for Small Bodies Nomenclature of the International Astronomical Union.

Near-Earth obj.	MBA (inner)	MBA (outer)	Centaur
Mars-crosser	MBA (middle)	Jupiter trojan	Trans-Neptunian obj.
Unclassified

== 569001–569100 ==
Designation			Discovery			Properties		Ref
Permanent	Provisional	Named after	Date	Site	Discoverer(s)	Category	Diam.	Ref
569001	2005 ES_{200}	—	March 8, 2005	Mount Lemmon	Mount Lemmon Survey	MAS	650 m	MPC · JPL
569002	2005 EV_{210}	—	March 4, 2005	Kitt Peak	Spacewatch	PHO	720 m	MPC · JPL
569003	2005 EK_{248}	—	March 12, 2005	Kitt Peak	Spacewatch	·	1.5 km	MPC · JPL
569004	2005 EL_{259}	—	March 11, 2005	Mount Lemmon	Mount Lemmon Survey	·	1.2 km	MPC · JPL
569005	2005 EK_{261}	—	March 12, 2005	Kitt Peak	Spacewatch	HNS	1.1 km	MPC · JPL
569006	2005 EK_{267}	—	March 13, 2005	Kitt Peak	Spacewatch	·	970 m	MPC · JPL
569007	2005 EB_{289}	—	March 9, 2005	Anderson Mesa	LONEOS	·	1.2 km	MPC · JPL
569008	2005 ES_{300}	—	March 11, 2005	Kitt Peak	Deep Ecliptic Survey	·	1.5 km	MPC · JPL
569009	2005 EA_{302}	—	March 11, 2005	Kitt Peak	Deep Ecliptic Survey	KOR	970 m	MPC · JPL
569010	2005 EL_{308}	—	March 8, 2005	Mount Lemmon	Mount Lemmon Survey	·	860 m	MPC · JPL
569011	2005 EK_{311}	—	March 10, 2005	Mount Lemmon	Mount Lemmon Survey	KOR	1.3 km	MPC · JPL
569012	2005 ES_{311}	—	March 10, 2005	Mount Lemmon	Mount Lemmon Survey	KOR	1.3 km	MPC · JPL
569013	2005 ET_{312}	—	March 11, 2005	Mount Lemmon	Mount Lemmon Survey	DOR	2.4 km	MPC · JPL
569014	2005 EF_{313}	—	March 11, 2005	Mount Lemmon	Mount Lemmon Survey	AGN	1.1 km	MPC · JPL
569015	2005 EU_{319}	—	January 29, 2014	Kitt Peak	Spacewatch	·	1.3 km	MPC · JPL
569016	2005 ES_{322}	—	March 9, 2005	Catalina	CSS	JUN	820 m	MPC · JPL
569017	2005 EL_{333}	—	March 10, 2005	Mount Lemmon	Mount Lemmon Survey	·	1.6 km	MPC · JPL
569018	2005 EV_{334}	—	March 14, 2005	Mount Lemmon	Mount Lemmon Survey	·	930 m	MPC · JPL
569019	2005 EB_{335}	—	December 30, 2008	Mount Lemmon	Mount Lemmon Survey	·	1.9 km	MPC · JPL
569020	2005 ED_{335}	—	December 1, 2008	Kitt Peak	Spacewatch	·	1.7 km	MPC · JPL
569021	2005 EF_{335}	—	August 10, 2012	Kitt Peak	Spacewatch	·	1.8 km	MPC · JPL
569022	2005 EW_{335}	—	December 11, 2013	Mount Lemmon	Mount Lemmon Survey	·	1.8 km	MPC · JPL
569023	2005 EZ_{335}	—	March 10, 2005	Mount Lemmon	Mount Lemmon Survey	KOR	1.1 km	MPC · JPL
569024	2005 EJ_{336}	—	February 7, 2008	Mount Lemmon	Mount Lemmon Survey	·	830 m	MPC · JPL
569025	2005 EU_{336}	—	September 25, 1998	Apache Point	SDSS	·	1.4 km	MPC · JPL
569026	2005 ED_{337}	—	October 8, 2007	Mount Lemmon	Mount Lemmon Survey	·	700 m	MPC · JPL
569027	2005 EF_{337}	—	March 3, 2005	Catalina	CSS	ERI	1.3 km	MPC · JPL
569028	2005 EP_{337}	—	March 8, 2005	Mount Lemmon	Mount Lemmon Survey	·	850 m	MPC · JPL
569029	2005 EL_{338}	—	August 21, 2006	Kitt Peak	Spacewatch	·	540 m	MPC · JPL
569030	2005 EA_{339}	—	March 4, 2005	Mount Lemmon	Mount Lemmon Survey	·	870 m	MPC · JPL
569031	2005 EU_{339}	—	May 1, 2009	Mount Lemmon	Mount Lemmon Survey	·	860 m	MPC · JPL
569032	2005 EK_{340}	—	February 19, 2009	Kitt Peak	Spacewatch	·	1.6 km	MPC · JPL
569033	2005 EO_{340}	—	February 7, 2013	Kitt Peak	Spacewatch	·	1.2 km	MPC · JPL
569034	2005 ET_{340}	—	April 28, 2014	Haleakala	Pan-STARRS 1	·	1.8 km	MPC · JPL
569035	2005 ED_{341}	—	March 8, 2005	Mount Lemmon	Mount Lemmon Survey	KOR	1.1 km	MPC · JPL
569036	2005 EJ_{341}	—	March 8, 2005	Mount Lemmon	Mount Lemmon Survey	·	1.6 km	MPC · JPL
569037	2005 EP_{341}	—	March 17, 2012	Mount Lemmon	Mount Lemmon Survey	·	3.6 km	MPC · JPL
569038	2005 EN_{344}	—	February 17, 2010	Kitt Peak	Spacewatch	·	1.4 km	MPC · JPL
569039	2005 EU_{344}	—	October 11, 2012	Haleakala	Pan-STARRS 1	KOR	1.1 km	MPC · JPL
569040	2005 EU_{347}	—	February 27, 2015	Haleakala	Pan-STARRS 1	·	1.5 km	MPC · JPL
569041	2005 EM_{348}	—	March 10, 2005	Mount Lemmon	Mount Lemmon Survey	KOR	1.2 km	MPC · JPL
569042	2005 EV_{348}	—	March 9, 2005	Mount Lemmon	Mount Lemmon Survey	KOR	1.1 km	MPC · JPL
569043	2005 EC_{349}	—	November 13, 2012	Mount Lemmon	Mount Lemmon Survey	·	2.2 km	MPC · JPL
569044	2005 FT_{14}	—	March 18, 2005	Catalina	CSS	·	1.6 km	MPC · JPL
569045	2005 FQ_{16}	—	March 10, 2005	Mount Lemmon	Mount Lemmon Survey	·	910 m	MPC · JPL
569046	2005 FQ_{17}	—	January 23, 2015	Haleakala	Pan-STARRS 1	·	480 m	MPC · JPL
569047	2005 FN_{18}	—	January 20, 2009	Kitt Peak	Spacewatch	MAR	880 m	MPC · JPL
569048	2005 FL_{19}	—	May 22, 2015	Haleakala	Pan-STARRS 1	·	1.6 km	MPC · JPL
569049	2005 GC_{27}	—	March 11, 2005	Anderson Mesa	LONEOS	·	1.3 km	MPC · JPL
569050	2005 GW_{36}	—	April 2, 2005	Mount Lemmon	Mount Lemmon Survey	·	1.4 km	MPC · JPL
569051	2005 GL_{68}	—	April 2, 2005	Mount Lemmon	Mount Lemmon Survey	·	2.0 km	MPC · JPL
569052	2005 GJ_{71}	—	March 8, 2005	Mount Lemmon	Mount Lemmon Survey	·	1.2 km	MPC · JPL
569053	2005 GK_{87}	—	April 4, 2005	Mount Lemmon	Mount Lemmon Survey	·	1.7 km	MPC · JPL
569054	2005 GR_{97}	—	April 7, 2005	Kitt Peak	Spacewatch	·	570 m	MPC · JPL
569055	2005 GD_{98}	—	April 7, 2005	Mount Lemmon	Mount Lemmon Survey	·	1.5 km	MPC · JPL
569056	2005 GH_{98}	—	April 7, 2005	Mount Lemmon	Mount Lemmon Survey	·	2.0 km	MPC · JPL
569057	2005 GL_{98}	—	April 7, 2005	Kitt Peak	Spacewatch	·	1.7 km	MPC · JPL
569058	2005 GC_{115}	—	April 10, 2005	Mount Lemmon	Mount Lemmon Survey	·	1.7 km	MPC · JPL
569059	2005 GK_{120}	—	March 12, 2005	Kitt Peak	Spacewatch	MAS	660 m	MPC · JPL
569060	2005 GR_{120}	—	March 13, 2005	Kitt Peak	Spacewatch	NYS	930 m	MPC · JPL
569061	2005 GO_{129}	—	April 7, 2005	Kitt Peak	Spacewatch	·	990 m	MPC · JPL
569062	2005 GN_{155}	—	February 14, 2009	Kitt Peak	Spacewatch	KOR	1.1 km	MPC · JPL
569063	2005 GZ_{155}	—	March 10, 2005	Mount Lemmon	Mount Lemmon Survey	·	1.2 km	MPC · JPL
569064	2005 GJ_{176}	—	April 14, 2005	Kitt Peak	Spacewatch	MRX	1.1 km	MPC · JPL
569065	2005 GF_{180}	—	March 13, 2005	Siding Spring	SSS	PHO	1.4 km	MPC · JPL
569066	2005 GK_{186}	—	April 10, 2005	Kitt Peak	Deep Ecliptic Survey	KOR	1.1 km	MPC · JPL
569067	2005 GB_{194}	—	April 10, 2005	Kitt Peak	Deep Ecliptic Survey	·	460 m	MPC · JPL
569068	2005 GP_{194}	—	April 4, 2005	Mount Lemmon	Mount Lemmon Survey	AGN	930 m	MPC · JPL
569069	2005 GS_{197}	—	April 10, 2005	Kitt Peak	Deep Ecliptic Survey	KOR	1.1 km	MPC · JPL
569070	2005 GJ_{201}	—	April 4, 2005	Mount Lemmon	Mount Lemmon Survey	·	610 m	MPC · JPL
569071	2005 GQ_{206}	—	April 16, 2005	Kitt Peak	Spacewatch	·	580 m	MPC · JPL
569072	2005 GL_{213}	—	March 17, 2005	Mount Lemmon	Mount Lemmon Survey	·	980 m	MPC · JPL
569073	2005 GL_{222}	—	March 14, 2005	Mount Lemmon	Mount Lemmon Survey	·	970 m	MPC · JPL
569074	2005 GZ_{224}	—	April 11, 2005	Kitt Peak	Spacewatch	NYS	730 m	MPC · JPL
569075	2005 GV_{229}	—	March 8, 2005	Mount Lemmon	Mount Lemmon Survey	·	1.4 km	MPC · JPL
569076	2005 GY_{231}	—	March 8, 2005	Mount Lemmon	Mount Lemmon Survey	·	2.8 km	MPC · JPL
569077	2005 GB_{232}	—	October 15, 2007	Mount Lemmon	Mount Lemmon Survey	EOS	1.3 km	MPC · JPL
569078	2005 GF_{232}	—	September 14, 2013	Mount Lemmon	Mount Lemmon Survey	VER	2.6 km	MPC · JPL
569079	2005 GG_{233}	—	March 17, 2015	Haleakala	Pan-STARRS 1	·	1.6 km	MPC · JPL
569080	2005 GF_{234}	—	September 19, 1995	Kitt Peak	Spacewatch	·	940 m	MPC · JPL
569081	2005 GR_{234}	—	March 26, 2014	Mount Lemmon	Mount Lemmon Survey	·	1.5 km	MPC · JPL
569082	2005 GG_{235}	—	April 6, 2005	Mount Lemmon	Mount Lemmon Survey	H	280 m	MPC · JPL
569083	2005 GJ_{235}	—	February 16, 2015	Haleakala	Pan-STARRS 1	·	1.4 km	MPC · JPL
569084	2005 GO_{235}	—	January 18, 2016	Haleakala	Pan-STARRS 1	·	1.0 km	MPC · JPL
569085	2005 GM_{236}	—	July 19, 2015	Haleakala	Pan-STARRS 1	·	1.4 km	MPC · JPL
569086	2005 GR_{237}	—	January 14, 2016	Haleakala	Pan-STARRS 1	·	1.2 km	MPC · JPL
569087	2005 GB_{239}	—	April 11, 2005	Mount Lemmon	Mount Lemmon Survey	·	870 m	MPC · JPL
569088	2005 GC_{239}	—	April 2, 2005	Mount Lemmon	Mount Lemmon Survey	·	950 m	MPC · JPL
569089	2005 GE_{240}	—	April 4, 2005	Mount Lemmon	Mount Lemmon Survey	·	1.4 km	MPC · JPL
569090	2005 HU_{9}	—	April 30, 2005	Kitt Peak	Spacewatch	·	1.9 km	MPC · JPL
569091	2005 HQ_{10}	—	December 4, 2013	Haleakala	Pan-STARRS 1	·	1.4 km	MPC · JPL
569092	2005 HY_{10}	—	April 16, 2005	Kitt Peak	Spacewatch	·	610 m	MPC · JPL
569093	2005 HM_{12}	—	April 30, 2005	Campo Imperatore	CINEOS	·	1.2 km	MPC · JPL
569094	2005 JS_{13}	—	May 4, 2005	Mauna Kea	Veillet, C.	NAE	1.7 km	MPC · JPL
569095	2005 JU_{23}	—	April 7, 2005	Kitt Peak	Spacewatch	·	830 m	MPC · JPL
569096	2005 JG_{33}	—	May 4, 2005	Mount Lemmon	Mount Lemmon Survey	EOS	1.6 km	MPC · JPL
569097	2005 JS_{40}	—	April 11, 2005	Mount Lemmon	Mount Lemmon Survey	·	1.1 km	MPC · JPL
569098	2005 JJ_{43}	—	May 8, 2005	Mount Lemmon	Mount Lemmon Survey	·	1.1 km	MPC · JPL
569099	2005 JC_{54}	—	May 4, 2005	Kitt Peak	Spacewatch	·	2.1 km	MPC · JPL
569100	2005 JY_{58}	—	May 8, 2005	Kitt Peak	Spacewatch	AGN	1.0 km	MPC · JPL

== 569101–569200 ==
back to top

Designation			Discovery			Properties		Ref
Permanent	Provisional	Named after	Date	Site	Discoverer(s)	Category	Diam.	Ref
569101	2005 JJ_{63}	—	May 4, 2005	Kitt Peak	D. E. Trilling, A. S. Rivkin	H	530 m	MPC · JPL
569102	2005 JX_{63}	—	May 4, 2005	Kitt Peak	D. E. Trilling, A. S. Rivkin	H	510 m	MPC · JPL
569103	2005 JK_{72}	—	May 8, 2005	Kitt Peak	Spacewatch	·	2.1 km	MPC · JPL
569104	2005 JG_{78}	—	May 10, 2005	Mount Lemmon	Mount Lemmon Survey	NYS	1.0 km	MPC · JPL
569105	2005 JD_{95}	—	February 1, 2009	Mount Lemmon	Mount Lemmon Survey	KOR	1.5 km	MPC · JPL
569106	2005 JD_{104}	—	May 10, 2005	Mount Lemmon	Mount Lemmon Survey	PHO	860 m	MPC · JPL
569107	2005 JS_{129}	—	May 13, 2005	Kitt Peak	Spacewatch	3:2	4.1 km	MPC · JPL
569108	2005 JU_{130}	—	April 16, 2005	Kitt Peak	Spacewatch	MAS	730 m	MPC · JPL
569109	2005 JD_{131}	—	May 13, 2005	Kitt Peak	Spacewatch	·	1.9 km	MPC · JPL
569110	2005 JQ_{137}	—	May 13, 2005	Kitt Peak	Spacewatch	·	1.4 km	MPC · JPL
569111	2005 JT_{151}	—	March 17, 2005	Catalina	CSS	·	1.3 km	MPC · JPL
569112	2005 JT_{156}	—	May 4, 2005	Kitt Peak	Spacewatch	·	2.3 km	MPC · JPL
569113	2005 JF_{159}	—	May 7, 2005	Kitt Peak	Spacewatch	SUL	1.8 km	MPC · JPL
569114	2005 JR_{174}	—	April 11, 2005	Mount Lemmon	Mount Lemmon Survey	·	1.7 km	MPC · JPL
569115	2005 JG_{187}	—	May 7, 2005	Mount Lemmon	Mount Lemmon Survey	·	1.0 km	MPC · JPL
569116	2005 JQ_{187}	—	August 4, 2011	Haleakala	Pan-STARRS 1	·	3.0 km	MPC · JPL
569117	2005 JS_{188}	—	February 15, 2016	Mount Lemmon	Mount Lemmon Survey	NYS	1.1 km	MPC · JPL
569118	2005 JY_{188}	—	August 12, 2013	Kitt Peak	Spacewatch	·	920 m	MPC · JPL
569119	2005 JW_{189}	—	June 20, 2013	Haleakala	Pan-STARRS 1	·	960 m	MPC · JPL
569120	2005 JK_{190}	—	May 14, 2005	Mount Lemmon	Mount Lemmon Survey	GAL	1.4 km	MPC · JPL
569121	2005 JM_{190}	—	December 5, 2010	Kitt Peak	Spacewatch	3:2	4.4 km	MPC · JPL
569122	2005 JX_{190}	—	October 21, 2012	Mount Lemmon	Mount Lemmon Survey	·	1.7 km	MPC · JPL
569123	2005 JA_{191}	—	October 8, 2012	Mount Lemmon	Mount Lemmon Survey	·	1.7 km	MPC · JPL
569124	2005 JB_{191}	—	March 28, 2008	Mount Lemmon	Mount Lemmon Survey	·	600 m	MPC · JPL
569125	2005 JF_{191}	—	April 4, 2014	Haleakala	Pan-STARRS 1	HOF	1.9 km	MPC · JPL
569126	2005 JG_{192}	—	May 3, 2005	Kitt Peak	Spacewatch	·	1.2 km	MPC · JPL
569127	2005 KX_{14}	—	May 20, 2005	Mount Lemmon	Mount Lemmon Survey	(1547)	1.8 km	MPC · JPL
569128	2005 LD_{11}	—	June 3, 2005	Kitt Peak	Spacewatch	·	1.4 km	MPC · JPL
569129	2005 LN_{13}	—	June 4, 2005	Kitt Peak	Spacewatch	·	1.8 km	MPC · JPL
569130	2005 LO_{23}	—	May 8, 2005	Mount Lemmon	Mount Lemmon Survey	·	1.2 km	MPC · JPL
569131	2005 LB_{30}	—	June 11, 2005	Kitt Peak	Spacewatch	·	2.2 km	MPC · JPL
569132	2005 LP_{30}	—	June 12, 2005	Kitt Peak	Spacewatch	EOS	1.8 km	MPC · JPL
569133	2005 LU_{31}	—	June 8, 2005	Kitt Peak	Spacewatch	·	470 m	MPC · JPL
569134	2005 LE_{54}	—	June 15, 2005	Mount Lemmon	Mount Lemmon Survey	·	980 m	MPC · JPL
569135	2005 LS_{54}	—	March 21, 2015	Haleakala	Pan-STARRS 1	·	900 m	MPC · JPL
569136	2005 LT_{54}	—	July 31, 2016	Haleakala	Pan-STARRS 1	·	1.9 km	MPC · JPL
569137	2005 LF_{56}	—	December 13, 2006	Mount Lemmon	Mount Lemmon Survey	·	1.3 km	MPC · JPL
569138	2005 LL_{56}	—	May 16, 2005	Mount Lemmon	Mount Lemmon Survey	·	1.9 km	MPC · JPL
569139	2005 LV_{56}	—	June 1, 2005	Kitt Peak	Spacewatch	·	540 m	MPC · JPL
569140	2005 LC_{58}	—	March 19, 2009	Kitt Peak	Spacewatch	·	1.4 km	MPC · JPL
569141	2005 LR_{58}	—	June 14, 2005	Mount Lemmon	Mount Lemmon Survey	EOS	1.9 km	MPC · JPL
569142	2005 MA_{5}	—	June 4, 2005	Socorro	LINEAR	·	580 m	MPC · JPL
569143	2005 MJ_{18}	—	May 20, 2005	Mount Lemmon	Mount Lemmon Survey	·	2.6 km	MPC · JPL
569144	2005 MW_{28}	—	June 29, 2005	Kitt Peak	Spacewatch	·	920 m	MPC · JPL
569145	2005 MW_{34}	—	June 29, 2005	Palomar	NEAT	H	750 m	MPC · JPL
569146	2005 MS_{48}	—	June 29, 2005	Kitt Peak	Spacewatch	·	1.2 km	MPC · JPL
569147	2005 MT_{51}	—	June 30, 2005	Kitt Peak	Spacewatch	·	770 m	MPC · JPL
569148	2005 MX_{55}	—	June 30, 2005	Kitt Peak	Spacewatch	·	580 m	MPC · JPL
569149	2005 NG_{8}	—	July 1, 2005	Kitt Peak	Spacewatch	·	2.2 km	MPC · JPL
569150	2005 NH_{16}	—	July 2, 2005	Kitt Peak	Spacewatch	NYS	1.2 km	MPC · JPL
569151	2005 NW_{20}	—	July 14, 2001	Palomar	NEAT	·	1.3 km	MPC · JPL
569152	2005 NX_{30}	—	July 4, 2005	Mount Lemmon	Mount Lemmon Survey	EOS	2.2 km	MPC · JPL
569153	2005 ND_{38}	—	July 6, 2005	Kitt Peak	Spacewatch	·	1.9 km	MPC · JPL
569154	2005 NT_{38}	—	July 6, 2005	Kitt Peak	Spacewatch	·	520 m	MPC · JPL
569155	2005 NE_{40}	—	July 3, 2005	Mount Lemmon	Mount Lemmon Survey	·	660 m	MPC · JPL
569156	2005 NV_{43}	—	July 6, 2005	Kitt Peak	Spacewatch	·	1.5 km	MPC · JPL
569157	2005 NR_{47}	—	July 7, 2005	Kitt Peak	Spacewatch	·	2.1 km	MPC · JPL
569158	2005 NK_{56}	—	July 5, 2005	Kitt Peak	Spacewatch	·	2.5 km	MPC · JPL
569159	2005 NL_{65}	—	June 18, 2005	Mount Lemmon	Mount Lemmon Survey	·	1.5 km	MPC · JPL
569160	2005 NX_{66}	—	July 2, 2005	Kitt Peak	Spacewatch	·	2.2 km	MPC · JPL
569161	2005 NH_{68}	—	July 3, 2005	Mount Lemmon	Mount Lemmon Survey	·	790 m	MPC · JPL
569162	2005 NL_{71}	—	July 5, 2005	Mount Lemmon	Mount Lemmon Survey	·	680 m	MPC · JPL
569163	2005 NT_{73}	—	July 9, 2005	Kitt Peak	Spacewatch	EOS	1.8 km	MPC · JPL
569164	2005 NF_{79}	—	July 12, 2005	Mount Lemmon	Mount Lemmon Survey	·	1.8 km	MPC · JPL
569165	2005 NM_{79}	—	July 12, 2005	Mount Lemmon	Mount Lemmon Survey	·	2.8 km	MPC · JPL
569166	2005 NS_{85}	—	June 14, 2005	Mount Lemmon	Mount Lemmon Survey	·	940 m	MPC · JPL
569167	2005 NM_{90}	—	July 5, 2005	Kitt Peak	Spacewatch	·	2.0 km	MPC · JPL
569168	2005 NB_{94}	—	July 6, 2005	Kitt Peak	Spacewatch	·	1.4 km	MPC · JPL
569169	2005 NN_{95}	—	July 7, 2005	Kitt Peak	Spacewatch	·	900 m	MPC · JPL
569170	2005 NO_{101}	—	July 12, 2005	Mount Lemmon	Mount Lemmon Survey	·	710 m	MPC · JPL
569171	2005 ND_{104}	—	July 7, 2005	Mauna Kea	Veillet, C.	·	3.5 km	MPC · JPL
569172	2005 NK_{111}	—	July 7, 2005	Mauna Kea	Veillet, C.	·	2.0 km	MPC · JPL
569173	2005 NP_{115}	—	July 7, 2005	Mauna Kea	Veillet, C.	EOS	1.4 km	MPC · JPL
569174	2005 NE_{117}	—	July 15, 2005	Mount Lemmon	Mount Lemmon Survey	·	1.7 km	MPC · JPL
569175	2005 NK_{120}	—	July 7, 2005	Mauna Kea	Veillet, C.	·	460 m	MPC · JPL
569176	2005 NQ_{127}	—	February 12, 2008	Mount Lemmon	Mount Lemmon Survey	·	940 m	MPC · JPL
569177	2005 NE_{128}	—	June 18, 2014	Haleakala	Pan-STARRS 1	·	1.7 km	MPC · JPL
569178	2005 NV_{128}	—	December 17, 2007	Kitt Peak	Spacewatch	·	2.8 km	MPC · JPL
569179	2005 NW_{129}	—	December 31, 2007	Mount Lemmon	Mount Lemmon Survey	EOS	1.9 km	MPC · JPL
569180	2005 NZ_{129}	—	January 15, 2008	Mount Lemmon	Mount Lemmon Survey	EOS	2.1 km	MPC · JPL
569181	2005 ND_{130}	—	December 21, 2014	Haleakala	Pan-STARRS 1	·	850 m	MPC · JPL
569182	2005 NE_{130}	—	December 31, 2007	Kitt Peak	Spacewatch	EOS	1.7 km	MPC · JPL
569183	2005 NF_{130}	—	August 30, 2016	Haleakala	Pan-STARRS 1	·	2.1 km	MPC · JPL
569184	2005 NG_{130}	—	July 9, 2005	Kitt Peak	Spacewatch	·	1.7 km	MPC · JPL
569185	2005 NU_{130}	—	January 19, 2012	Haleakala	Pan-STARRS 1	·	930 m	MPC · JPL
569186	2005 NV_{131}	—	July 23, 2015	Haleakala	Pan-STARRS 1	·	1.4 km	MPC · JPL
569187	2005 OP_{15}	—	July 29, 2005	Palomar	NEAT	·	1.4 km	MPC · JPL
569188	2005 OE_{28}	—	July 30, 2005	Palomar	NEAT	·	1.2 km	MPC · JPL
569189	2005 OK_{28}	—	July 30, 2005	Palomar	NEAT	·	2.0 km	MPC · JPL
569190	2005 OC_{31}	—	July 29, 2005	Palomar	NEAT	·	1.4 km	MPC · JPL
569191	2005 OF_{31}	—	July 29, 2005	Palomar	NEAT	·	2.4 km	MPC · JPL
569192	2005 OG_{32}	—	November 23, 2006	Kitt Peak	Spacewatch	·	2.7 km	MPC · JPL
569193	2005 OR_{32}	—	July 30, 2005	Palomar	NEAT	T_{j} (2.99) · EUP	3.5 km	MPC · JPL
569194	2005 PY_{7}	—	August 4, 2005	Palomar	NEAT	·	2.3 km	MPC · JPL
569195	2005 PA_{15}	—	August 4, 2005	Palomar	NEAT	·	1.9 km	MPC · JPL
569196	2005 PK_{27}	—	August 10, 2005	Mauna Kea	P. A. Wiegert, D. D. Balam	·	2.1 km	MPC · JPL
569197	2005 PJ_{29}	—	August 4, 2005	Palomar	NEAT	·	2.7 km	MPC · JPL
569198	2005 PS_{29}	—	October 17, 2006	Kitt Peak	Spacewatch	·	1.9 km	MPC · JPL
569199	2005 PM_{30}	—	March 13, 2008	Kitt Peak	Spacewatch	·	690 m	MPC · JPL
569200	2005 PN_{30}	—	August 6, 2005	Palomar	NEAT	·	420 m	MPC · JPL

== 569201–569300 ==
back to top

Designation			Discovery			Properties		Ref
Permanent	Provisional	Named after	Date	Site	Discoverer(s)	Category	Diam.	Ref
569201	2005 PV_{30}	—	August 6, 2005	Palomar	NEAT	·	520 m	MPC · JPL
569202	2005 PZ_{30}	—	March 26, 2008	Mount Lemmon	Mount Lemmon Survey	·	780 m	MPC · JPL
569203	2005 PK_{31}	—	August 3, 2016	Haleakala	Pan-STARRS 1	V	450 m	MPC · JPL
569204	2005 PP_{31}	—	August 8, 2005	Cerro Tololo	Deep Ecliptic Survey	·	1.3 km	MPC · JPL
569205	2005 PL_{32}	—	August 8, 2005	Cerro Tololo	Deep Ecliptic Survey	·	830 m	MPC · JPL
569206	2005 PS_{32}	—	August 9, 2005	Cerro Tololo	Deep Ecliptic Survey	·	1.2 km	MPC · JPL
569207	2005 QK_{10}	—	August 25, 2005	Campo Imperatore	CINEOS	MAR	1.0 km	MPC · JPL
569208	2005 QB_{12}	—	July 30, 2005	Palomar	NEAT	·	620 m	MPC · JPL
569209	2005 QO_{12}	—	August 6, 2005	Palomar	NEAT	·	3.3 km	MPC · JPL
569210	2005 QV_{18}	—	August 25, 2005	Palomar	NEAT	·	650 m	MPC · JPL
569211	2005 QF_{19}	—	July 29, 2005	Palomar	NEAT	THM	2.2 km	MPC · JPL
569212	2005 QB_{28}	—	August 27, 2005	Kitt Peak	Spacewatch	EOS	1.9 km	MPC · JPL
569213	2005 QX_{28}	—	August 28, 2005	St. Véran	St. Veran	·	630 m	MPC · JPL
569214	2005 QR_{30}	—	August 28, 2005	St. Véran	St. Veran	·	2.2 km	MPC · JPL
569215	2005 QC_{32}	—	July 31, 2005	Palomar	NEAT	T_{j} (2.9)	3.9 km	MPC · JPL
569216	2005 QH_{35}	—	August 25, 2005	Palomar	NEAT	·	2.8 km	MPC · JPL
569217	2005 QU_{46}	—	August 28, 2005	Kitt Peak	Spacewatch	·	2.5 km	MPC · JPL
569218	2005 QB_{48}	—	July 30, 2005	Palomar	NEAT	·	620 m	MPC · JPL
569219	2005 QY_{48}	—	August 28, 2005	Kitt Peak	Spacewatch	·	460 m	MPC · JPL
569220	2005 QR_{51}	—	August 27, 2005	Kitt Peak	Spacewatch	EOS	2.0 km	MPC · JPL
569221	2005 QC_{56}	—	August 28, 2005	Kitt Peak	Spacewatch	·	950 m	MPC · JPL
569222	2005 QT_{56}	—	August 29, 2005	Vail-Jarnac	Jarnac	·	850 m	MPC · JPL
569223	2005 QJ_{59}	—	August 25, 2005	Palomar	NEAT	·	510 m	MPC · JPL
569224	2005 QH_{64}	—	August 26, 2005	Palomar	NEAT	·	1.6 km	MPC · JPL
569225	2005 QN_{64}	—	August 26, 2005	Palomar	NEAT	·	2.3 km	MPC · JPL
569226	2005 QQ_{64}	—	August 26, 2005	Palomar	NEAT	·	1.2 km	MPC · JPL
569227	2005 QV_{78}	—	August 25, 2005	Palomar	NEAT	·	610 m	MPC · JPL
569228	2005 QC_{79}	—	August 25, 2005	Palomar	NEAT	H	450 m	MPC · JPL
569229	2005 QQ_{85}	—	August 30, 2005	Kitt Peak	Spacewatch	·	2.2 km	MPC · JPL
569230	2005 QE_{90}	—	August 25, 2005	Palomar	NEAT	NYS	970 m	MPC · JPL
569231	2005 QC_{93}	—	August 26, 2005	Palomar	NEAT	·	2.4 km	MPC · JPL
569232	2005 QG_{94}	—	August 6, 2005	Palomar	NEAT	·	590 m	MPC · JPL
569233	2005 QE_{95}	—	July 30, 2005	Palomar	NEAT	·	1.7 km	MPC · JPL
569234	2005 QR_{98}	—	August 31, 2005	Kitt Peak	Spacewatch	EOS	2.0 km	MPC · JPL
569235	2005 QB_{99}	—	July 30, 2005	Palomar	NEAT	3:2 · SHU	4.4 km	MPC · JPL
569236	2005 QZ_{101}	—	August 31, 2005	Kitt Peak	Spacewatch	·	3.2 km	MPC · JPL
569237	2005 QV_{102}	—	August 31, 2005	Kitt Peak	Spacewatch	·	2.0 km	MPC · JPL
569238	2005 QE_{104}	—	August 31, 2005	Kitt Peak	Spacewatch	·	560 m	MPC · JPL
569239	2005 QX_{105}	—	April 23, 2004	Kitt Peak	Spacewatch	·	2.9 km	MPC · JPL
569240	2005 QD_{118}	—	August 28, 2005	Kitt Peak	Spacewatch	·	710 m	MPC · JPL
569241	2005 QE_{129}	—	August 28, 2005	Kitt Peak	Spacewatch	·	1.7 km	MPC · JPL
569242	2005 QJ_{129}	—	August 28, 2005	Kitt Peak	Spacewatch	HNS	920 m	MPC · JPL
569243	2005 QE_{132}	—	August 28, 2005	Kitt Peak	Spacewatch	·	2.3 km	MPC · JPL
569244	2005 QL_{134}	—	August 28, 2005	Kitt Peak	Spacewatch	·	1.1 km	MPC · JPL
569245	2005 QE_{139}	—	August 28, 2005	Kitt Peak	Spacewatch	·	2.0 km	MPC · JPL
569246	2005 QU_{141}	—	August 30, 2005	Kitt Peak	Spacewatch	·	660 m	MPC · JPL
569247	2005 QN_{142}	—	August 30, 2005	Kitt Peak	Spacewatch	·	1.0 km	MPC · JPL
569248	2005 QD_{145}	—	August 27, 2005	Palomar	NEAT	·	3.1 km	MPC · JPL
569249	2005 QK_{146}	—	July 26, 2005	Palomar	NEAT	T_{j} (2.98) · 3:2	7.1 km	MPC · JPL
569250	2005 QG_{153}	—	July 12, 2005	Mount Lemmon	Mount Lemmon Survey	·	730 m	MPC · JPL
569251	2005 QO_{155}	—	July 29, 2005	Palomar	NEAT	·	2.4 km	MPC · JPL
569252	2005 QK_{179}	—	August 25, 2005	Palomar	NEAT	·	2.4 km	MPC · JPL
569253	2005 QN_{179}	—	August 26, 2005	Palomar	NEAT	·	2.4 km	MPC · JPL
569254	2005 QM_{180}	—	August 28, 2005	Kitt Peak	Spacewatch	·	690 m	MPC · JPL
569255	2005 QR_{181}	—	August 30, 2005	Palomar	NEAT	·	2.8 km	MPC · JPL
569256	2005 QT_{185}	—	February 8, 2008	Mount Lemmon	Mount Lemmon Survey	EOS	1.4 km	MPC · JPL
569257	2005 QM_{190}	—	August 31, 2005	Palomar	NEAT	·	2.5 km	MPC · JPL
569258	2005 QQ_{190}	—	August 30, 2005	Palomar	NEAT	·	3.6 km	MPC · JPL
569259	2005 QO_{191}	—	December 25, 2006	Catalina	CSS	EUP	3.3 km	MPC · JPL
569260	2005 QP_{191}	—	August 27, 2005	Palomar	NEAT	·	2.9 km	MPC · JPL
569261	2005 QW_{191}	—	August 31, 2005	Kitt Peak	Spacewatch	·	610 m	MPC · JPL
569262	2005 QY_{191}	—	August 31, 2005	Kitt Peak	Spacewatch	·	510 m	MPC · JPL
569263	2005 QA_{192}	—	July 9, 2011	Haleakala	Pan-STARRS 1	TIR	2.6 km	MPC · JPL
569264	2005 QD_{192}	—	August 30, 2005	Palomar	NEAT	·	3.1 km	MPC · JPL
569265	2005 QE_{192}	—	November 22, 2006	Catalina	CSS	·	3.3 km	MPC · JPL
569266	2005 QG_{192}	—	August 25, 2005	Palomar	NEAT	TIR	3.1 km	MPC · JPL
569267	2005 QE_{193}	—	May 8, 2008	Kitt Peak	Spacewatch	·	980 m	MPC · JPL
569268	2005 QS_{193}	—	August 30, 2005	Kitt Peak	Spacewatch	·	910 m	MPC · JPL
569269	2005 QW_{193}	—	October 20, 2011	Mount Lemmon	Mount Lemmon Survey	·	2.4 km	MPC · JPL
569270	2005 QE_{194}	—	January 18, 2013	Haleakala	Pan-STARRS 1	·	2.4 km	MPC · JPL
569271	2005 QP_{194}	—	April 10, 2016	Haleakala	Pan-STARRS 1	·	1.1 km	MPC · JPL
569272	2005 QD_{195}	—	August 31, 2005	Kitt Peak	Spacewatch	·	600 m	MPC · JPL
569273	2005 QQ_{195}	—	January 10, 2013	Haleakala	Pan-STARRS 1	·	2.7 km	MPC · JPL
569274	2005 QC_{196}	—	December 9, 2012	Haleakala	Pan-STARRS 1	·	530 m	MPC · JPL
569275	2005 QH_{196}	—	September 17, 2012	Kitt Peak	Spacewatch	·	500 m	MPC · JPL
569276	2005 QA_{198}	—	August 29, 2005	Kitt Peak	Spacewatch	·	1.3 km	MPC · JPL
569277	2005 QO_{198}	—	August 27, 2005	Palomar	NEAT	·	590 m	MPC · JPL
569278	2005 QX_{201}	—	December 17, 2009	Mount Lemmon	Mount Lemmon Survey	·	620 m	MPC · JPL
569279	2005 QZ_{202}	—	August 31, 2005	Kitt Peak	Spacewatch	·	2.3 km	MPC · JPL
569280	2005 QB_{204}	—	August 30, 2005	Kitt Peak	Spacewatch	·	1.1 km	MPC · JPL
569281	2005 QE_{204}	—	August 28, 2005	Kitt Peak	Spacewatch	·	2.5 km	MPC · JPL
569282	2005 QF_{204}	—	August 28, 2005	Kitt Peak	Spacewatch	EOS	1.4 km	MPC · JPL
569283	2005 QZ_{204}	—	August 29, 2005	Kitt Peak	Spacewatch	·	680 m	MPC · JPL
569284	2005 QH_{205}	—	August 31, 2005	Kitt Peak	Spacewatch	·	1.8 km	MPC · JPL
569285	2005 QS_{205}	—	August 31, 2005	Kitt Peak	Spacewatch	·	2.2 km	MPC · JPL
569286	2005 QT_{205}	—	August 30, 2005	Kitt Peak	Spacewatch	THM	1.8 km	MPC · JPL
569287	2005 QG_{206}	—	August 30, 2005	Kitt Peak	Spacewatch	NYS	820 m	MPC · JPL
569288	2005 RB_{4}	—	September 3, 2005	Bergisch Gladbach	W. Bickel	EOS	2.8 km	MPC · JPL
569289	2005 RR_{10}	—	August 27, 2005	Palomar	NEAT	·	2.6 km	MPC · JPL
569290	2005 RB_{11}	—	September 10, 2005	Anderson Mesa	LONEOS	·	2.8 km	MPC · JPL
569291	2005 RQ_{11}	—	August 30, 2005	Socorro	LINEAR	·	960 m	MPC · JPL
569292	2005 RZ_{13}	—	September 1, 2005	Kitt Peak	Spacewatch	·	700 m	MPC · JPL
569293	2005 RJ_{14}	—	September 1, 2005	Kitt Peak	Spacewatch	·	2.5 km	MPC · JPL
569294	2005 RJ_{17}	—	November 20, 2000	Apache Point	SDSS Collaboration	URS	2.5 km	MPC · JPL
569295	2005 RL_{18}	—	September 1, 2005	Kitt Peak	Spacewatch	·	2.7 km	MPC · JPL
569296	2005 RT_{19}	—	July 11, 2005	Mount Lemmon	Mount Lemmon Survey	NYS	870 m	MPC · JPL
569297	2005 RK_{32}	—	September 13, 2005	Kitt Peak	Spacewatch	THM	2.1 km	MPC · JPL
569298	2005 RD_{35}	—	September 3, 2005	Mauna Kea	Veillet, C.	KON	1.8 km	MPC · JPL
569299	2005 RS_{37}	—	September 3, 2005	Mauna Kea	Veillet, C.	EMA	2.2 km	MPC · JPL
569300	2005 RN_{38}	—	September 3, 2005	Mauna Kea	Veillet, C.	·	990 m	MPC · JPL

== 569301–569400 ==
back to top

Designation			Discovery			Properties		Ref
Permanent	Provisional	Named after	Date	Site	Discoverer(s)	Category	Diam.	Ref
569301	2005 RO_{38}	—	September 3, 2005	Mauna Kea	Veillet, C.	MAR	670 m	MPC · JPL
569302	2005 RT_{47}	—	October 1, 2005	Apache Point	SDSS Collaboration	·	2.2 km	MPC · JPL
569303	2005 RV_{47}	—	September 27, 2005	Apache Point	SDSS Collaboration	·	1.2 km	MPC · JPL
569304	2005 RC_{51}	—	September 18, 2001	Kitt Peak	Spacewatch	·	1.4 km	MPC · JPL
569305	2005 RX_{52}	—	September 1, 2005	Palomar	NEAT	·	2.8 km	MPC · JPL
569306	2005 RC_{53}	—	September 13, 2005	Kitt Peak	Spacewatch	·	2.4 km	MPC · JPL
569307	2005 RG_{53}	—	July 5, 2005	Kitt Peak	Spacewatch	·	2.4 km	MPC · JPL
569308	2005 RQ_{53}	—	September 13, 2005	Kitt Peak	Spacewatch	·	2.4 km	MPC · JPL
569309	2005 RW_{54}	—	October 20, 2016	Mount Lemmon	Mount Lemmon Survey	EOS	1.7 km	MPC · JPL
569310	2005 RL_{55}	—	September 1, 2013	Haleakala	Pan-STARRS 1	H	490 m	MPC · JPL
569311	2005 RA_{56}	—	September 14, 2005	Kitt Peak	Spacewatch	·	2.9 km	MPC · JPL
569312	2005 RV_{58}	—	November 18, 2017	Haleakala	Pan-STARRS 1	·	2.2 km	MPC · JPL
569313	2005 RM_{59}	—	September 1, 2005	Kitt Peak	Spacewatch	·	990 m	MPC · JPL
569314	2005 RT_{59}	—	September 13, 2005	Kitt Peak	Spacewatch	(5)	920 m	MPC · JPL
569315	2005 RB_{60}	—	August 28, 2016	Mount Lemmon	Mount Lemmon Survey	EOS	1.5 km	MPC · JPL
569316	2005 RD_{60}	—	September 13, 2005	Kitt Peak	Spacewatch	·	2.2 km	MPC · JPL
569317	2005 RF_{60}	—	September 1, 2005	Kitt Peak	Spacewatch	·	2.3 km	MPC · JPL
569318	2005 RE_{61}	—	September 1, 2005	Kitt Peak	Spacewatch	VER	2.5 km	MPC · JPL
569319	2005 SF_{5}	—	August 29, 2005	Palomar	NEAT	·	660 m	MPC · JPL
569320	2005 SJ_{8}	—	September 25, 2005	Kitt Peak	Spacewatch	3:2	4.7 km	MPC · JPL
569321	2005 SH_{12}	—	August 25, 2005	Palomar	NEAT	·	3.0 km	MPC · JPL
569322	2005 SW_{14}	—	September 26, 2005	Kitt Peak	Spacewatch	·	1.9 km	MPC · JPL
569323	2005 SE_{21}	—	September 26, 2005	Kitt Peak	Spacewatch	·	3.2 km	MPC · JPL
569324	2005 SD_{26}	—	September 26, 2005	Palomar	NEAT	TIR	2.6 km	MPC · JPL
569325	2005 SK_{42}	—	September 24, 2005	Kitt Peak	Spacewatch	·	2.7 km	MPC · JPL
569326	2005 SN_{46}	—	September 24, 2005	Kitt Peak	Spacewatch	LIX	3.5 km	MPC · JPL
569327	2005 SQ_{57}	—	September 26, 2005	Kitt Peak	Spacewatch	·	2.0 km	MPC · JPL
569328	2005 SB_{58}	—	September 26, 2005	Kitt Peak	Spacewatch	·	1.9 km	MPC · JPL
569329	2005 SX_{67}	—	September 27, 2005	Kitt Peak	Spacewatch	·	1.0 km	MPC · JPL
569330	2005 SJ_{81}	—	September 24, 2005	Kitt Peak	Spacewatch	·	2.5 km	MPC · JPL
569331	2005 SG_{84}	—	September 24, 2005	Kitt Peak	Spacewatch	·	1.4 km	MPC · JPL
569332	2005 SZ_{97}	—	September 25, 2005	Kitt Peak	Spacewatch	LIX	3.0 km	MPC · JPL
569333	2005 SJ_{110}	—	August 30, 2005	Socorro	LINEAR	·	2.5 km	MPC · JPL
569334	2005 SH_{111}	—	August 29, 2005	Palomar	NEAT	·	2.7 km	MPC · JPL
569335	2005 SL_{116}	—	September 27, 2005	Kitt Peak	Spacewatch	·	2.8 km	MPC · JPL
569336	2005 SH_{118}	—	August 31, 2005	Palomar	NEAT	·	630 m	MPC · JPL
569337	2005 SD_{126}	—	September 29, 2005	Mount Lemmon	Mount Lemmon Survey	·	1.5 km	MPC · JPL
569338	2005 SD_{129}	—	September 29, 2005	Mount Lemmon	Mount Lemmon Survey	·	2.1 km	MPC · JPL
569339	2005 SO_{140}	—	September 25, 2005	Kitt Peak	Spacewatch	·	520 m	MPC · JPL
569340	2005 SQ_{143}	—	September 25, 2005	Kitt Peak	Spacewatch	EOS	1.6 km	MPC · JPL
569341	2005 SG_{150}	—	August 30, 2005	Palomar	NEAT	·	650 m	MPC · JPL
569342	2005 SY_{157}	—	September 26, 2005	Kitt Peak	Spacewatch	·	2.5 km	MPC · JPL
569343	2005 SO_{158}	—	September 26, 2005	Palomar	NEAT	·	3.2 km	MPC · JPL
569344	2005 SZ_{158}	—	September 26, 2005	Kitt Peak	Spacewatch	·	2.7 km	MPC · JPL
569345	2005 SG_{165}	—	September 8, 2005	Socorro	LINEAR	ADE	1.6 km	MPC · JPL
569346	2005 SR_{168}	—	September 1, 2005	Kitt Peak	Spacewatch	·	2.7 km	MPC · JPL
569347	2005 SA_{175}	—	September 29, 2005	Kitt Peak	Spacewatch	·	610 m	MPC · JPL
569348	2005 SL_{175}	—	September 29, 2005	Kitt Peak	Spacewatch	·	2.9 km	MPC · JPL
569349	2005 SG_{182}	—	September 29, 2005	Kitt Peak	Spacewatch	·	2.5 km	MPC · JPL
569350	2005 SH_{190}	—	September 29, 2005	Anderson Mesa	LONEOS	·	570 m	MPC · JPL
569351	2005 SB_{203}	—	August 25, 2005	Palomar	NEAT	·	2.2 km	MPC · JPL
569352	2005 SK_{207}	—	September 30, 2005	Mount Lemmon	Mount Lemmon Survey	·	2.3 km	MPC · JPL
569353	2005 SM_{224}	—	September 29, 2005	Mount Lemmon	Mount Lemmon Survey	·	1.2 km	MPC · JPL
569354	2005 SO_{224}	—	September 29, 2005	Mount Lemmon	Mount Lemmon Survey	·	1.5 km	MPC · JPL
569355	2005 SE_{236}	—	September 29, 2005	Kitt Peak	Spacewatch	·	1.8 km	MPC · JPL
569356	2005 SF_{237}	—	September 29, 2005	Kitt Peak	Spacewatch	·	1.4 km	MPC · JPL
569357	2005 ST_{237}	—	September 29, 2005	Kitt Peak	Spacewatch	·	2.7 km	MPC · JPL
569358	2005 SK_{243}	—	September 30, 2005	Palomar	NEAT	·	2.5 km	MPC · JPL
569359	2005 SU_{244}	—	September 30, 2005	Mount Lemmon	Mount Lemmon Survey	·	2.3 km	MPC · JPL
569360	2005 SV_{245}	—	September 30, 2005	Mount Lemmon	Mount Lemmon Survey	·	1.2 km	MPC · JPL
569361	2005 SP_{252}	—	August 31, 2005	Palomar	NEAT	(5)	1.3 km	MPC · JPL
569362	2005 SV_{257}	—	May 13, 2009	Mount Lemmon	Mount Lemmon Survey	·	2.5 km	MPC · JPL
569363	2005 SC_{259}	—	September 24, 2005	Kitt Peak	Spacewatch	HNS	1.2 km	MPC · JPL
569364	2005 SK_{270}	—	September 29, 2005	Kitt Peak	Spacewatch	·	2.1 km	MPC · JPL
569365	2005 SG_{273}	—	September 27, 2005	Kitt Peak	Spacewatch	·	2.2 km	MPC · JPL
569366	2005 SJ_{274}	—	August 29, 2005	Palomar	NEAT	·	3.5 km	MPC · JPL
569367	2005 SO_{276}	—	June 27, 2004	Kitt Peak	Spacewatch	T_{j} (2.99) · 3:2	4.7 km	MPC · JPL
569368	2005 SD_{282}	—	October 31, 2005	Apache Point	SDSS Collaboration	EOS	1.6 km	MPC · JPL
569369	2005 SL_{282}	—	October 1, 2005	Apache Point	SDSS Collaboration	·	2.5 km	MPC · JPL
569370	2005 SG_{283}	—	October 1, 2005	Apache Point	SDSS Collaboration	EOS	1.9 km	MPC · JPL
569371	2005 SV_{284}	—	April 25, 2004	Kitt Peak	Spacewatch	·	1.1 km	MPC · JPL
569372	2005 SB_{285}	—	October 1, 2005	Apache Point	SDSS Collaboration	·	2.7 km	MPC · JPL
569373	2005 SC_{287}	—	October 1, 2005	Apache Point	SDSS Collaboration	·	2.4 km	MPC · JPL
569374	2005 SJ_{287}	—	October 1, 2005	Apache Point	SDSS Collaboration	EOS	1.8 km	MPC · JPL
569375	2005 SL_{287}	—	October 1, 2005	Apache Point	SDSS Collaboration	VER	2.0 km	MPC · JPL
569376	2005 SO_{288}	—	September 27, 2005	Apache Point	SDSS Collaboration	·	410 m	MPC · JPL
569377	2005 SU_{290}	—	September 26, 2005	Kitt Peak	Spacewatch	·	2.8 km	MPC · JPL
569378	2005 SY_{290}	—	September 23, 2005	Kitt Peak	Spacewatch	·	1.3 km	MPC · JPL
569379	2005 SE_{291}	—	September 23, 2005	Catalina	CSS	·	560 m	MPC · JPL
569380	2005 SP_{292}	—	September 30, 2005	Mount Lemmon	Mount Lemmon Survey	VER	2.1 km	MPC · JPL
569381	2005 SU_{294}	—	September 30, 2005	Mount Lemmon	Mount Lemmon Survey	·	670 m	MPC · JPL
569382	2005 SG_{295}	—	September 26, 2005	Kitt Peak	Spacewatch	THM	2.0 km	MPC · JPL
569383	2005 SO_{295}	—	February 8, 2013	Haleakala	Pan-STARRS 1	·	2.6 km	MPC · JPL
569384	2005 SZ_{295}	—	February 26, 2014	Haleakala	Pan-STARRS 1	·	2.3 km	MPC · JPL
569385	2005 SP_{297}	—	September 30, 2005	Mount Lemmon	Mount Lemmon Survey	·	3.0 km	MPC · JPL
569386	2005 SQ_{297}	—	September 28, 2011	Mount Lemmon	Mount Lemmon Survey	·	2.8 km	MPC · JPL
569387	2005 SU_{297}	—	January 30, 2011	Haleakala	Pan-STARRS 1	·	920 m	MPC · JPL
569388	2005 SY_{297}	—	September 29, 2005	Mount Lemmon	Mount Lemmon Survey	·	2.5 km	MPC · JPL
569389	2005 SR_{299}	—	September 29, 2005	Mount Lemmon	Mount Lemmon Survey	·	700 m	MPC · JPL
569390	2005 ST_{299}	—	April 23, 2014	Haleakala	Pan-STARRS 1	·	2.0 km	MPC · JPL
569391	2005 SH_{301}	—	September 11, 2005	Kitt Peak	Spacewatch	·	720 m	MPC · JPL
569392	2005 SF_{302}	—	September 26, 2005	Kitt Peak	Spacewatch	·	1.1 km	MPC · JPL
569393	2005 SQ_{302}	—	September 29, 2005	Mount Lemmon	Mount Lemmon Survey	VER	1.9 km	MPC · JPL
569394	2005 TJ_{1}	—	August 29, 2005	Anderson Mesa	LONEOS	·	2.1 km	MPC · JPL
569395	2005 TS_{4}	—	October 1, 2005	Mount Lemmon	Mount Lemmon Survey	·	920 m	MPC · JPL
569396	2005 TJ_{9}	—	October 1, 2005	Kitt Peak	Spacewatch	·	1.6 km	MPC · JPL
569397	2005 TC_{15}	—	October 3, 2005	Catalina	CSS	·	820 m	MPC · JPL
569398	2005 TT_{22}	—	October 1, 2005	Mount Lemmon	Mount Lemmon Survey	·	2.2 km	MPC · JPL
569399	2005 TB_{31}	—	October 1, 2005	Kitt Peak	Spacewatch	·	2.6 km	MPC · JPL
569400	2005 TN_{32}	—	October 1, 2005	Kitt Peak	Spacewatch	VER	3.0 km	MPC · JPL

== 569401–569500 ==
back to top

Designation			Discovery			Properties		Ref
Permanent	Provisional	Named after	Date	Site	Discoverer(s)	Category	Diam.	Ref
569401	2005 TF_{33}	—	October 1, 2005	Kitt Peak	Spacewatch	·	2.5 km	MPC · JPL
569402	2005 TC_{36}	—	October 1, 2005	Kitt Peak	Spacewatch	·	870 m	MPC · JPL
569403	2005 TE_{37}	—	October 1, 2005	Mount Lemmon	Mount Lemmon Survey	HOF	2.1 km	MPC · JPL
569404	2005 TE_{40}	—	October 1, 2005	Kitt Peak	Spacewatch	·	650 m	MPC · JPL
569405	2005 TU_{46}	—	October 2, 2005	Mount Lemmon	Mount Lemmon Survey	·	2.7 km	MPC · JPL
569406	2005 TQ_{55}	—	September 24, 2005	Kitt Peak	Spacewatch	·	1.8 km	MPC · JPL
569407	2005 TD_{66}	—	October 3, 2005	Catalina	CSS	·	3.2 km	MPC · JPL
569408	2005 TQ_{66}	—	October 5, 2005	Catalina	CSS	·	540 m	MPC · JPL
569409	2005 TT_{75}	—	September 2, 2005	Palomar	NEAT	·	860 m	MPC · JPL
569410	2005 TL_{76}	—	September 11, 2005	Vail-Jarnac	Jarnac	·	3.1 km	MPC · JPL
569411	2005 TC_{81}	—	October 3, 2005	Kitt Peak	Spacewatch	H	460 m	MPC · JPL
569412	2005 TM_{82}	—	October 3, 2005	Kitt Peak	Spacewatch	·	1 km	MPC · JPL
569413	2005 TK_{84}	—	October 3, 2005	Kitt Peak	Spacewatch	·	2.7 km	MPC · JPL
569414	2005 TW_{84}	—	October 3, 2005	Kitt Peak	Spacewatch	·	2.7 km	MPC · JPL
569415	2005 TJ_{87}	—	October 5, 2005	Kitt Peak	Spacewatch	·	2.1 km	MPC · JPL
569416	2005 TR_{92}	—	September 25, 2005	Kitt Peak	Spacewatch	·	2.9 km	MPC · JPL
569417	2005 TP_{112}	—	October 7, 2005	Kitt Peak	Spacewatch	VER	2.3 km	MPC · JPL
569418	2005 TP_{114}	—	October 7, 2005	Kitt Peak	Spacewatch	EOS	1.4 km	MPC · JPL
569419	2005 TQ_{114}	—	October 7, 2005	Kitt Peak	Spacewatch	·	690 m	MPC · JPL
569420	2005 TB_{116}	—	October 7, 2005	Kitt Peak	Spacewatch	VER	2.3 km	MPC · JPL
569421	2005 TF_{116}	—	September 27, 2005	Kitt Peak	Spacewatch	·	1.9 km	MPC · JPL
569422	2005 TD_{117}	—	October 3, 2005	Kitt Peak	Spacewatch	·	2.2 km	MPC · JPL
569423	2005 TL_{120}	—	September 29, 2005	Kitt Peak	Spacewatch	VER	2.0 km	MPC · JPL
569424	2005 TO_{120}	—	October 7, 2005	Kitt Peak	Spacewatch	·	870 m	MPC · JPL
569425	2005 TN_{123}	—	October 7, 2005	Kitt Peak	Spacewatch	·	2.3 km	MPC · JPL
569426	2005 TW_{125}	—	July 17, 2004	Cerro Tololo	Deep Ecliptic Survey	3:2	4.9 km	MPC · JPL
569427	2005 TT_{133}	—	October 9, 2005	Kitt Peak	Spacewatch	·	2.8 km	MPC · JPL
569428	2005 TC_{136}	—	September 25, 2005	Kitt Peak	Spacewatch	·	650 m	MPC · JPL
569429	2005 TL_{136}	—	October 6, 2005	Kitt Peak	Spacewatch	·	2.9 km	MPC · JPL
569430	2005 TD_{138}	—	September 29, 2005	Mount Lemmon	Mount Lemmon Survey	·	460 m	MPC · JPL
569431	2005 TT_{140}	—	October 8, 2005	Kitt Peak	Spacewatch	VER	2.2 km	MPC · JPL
569432	2005 TQ_{145}	—	October 8, 2005	Kitt Peak	Spacewatch	·	3.3 km	MPC · JPL
569433	2005 TV_{146}	—	October 8, 2005	Kitt Peak	Spacewatch	·	2.6 km	MPC · JPL
569434	2005 TO_{148}	—	October 8, 2005	Kitt Peak	Spacewatch	·	490 m	MPC · JPL
569435	2005 TK_{153}	—	August 29, 2005	Palomar	NEAT	·	2.5 km	MPC · JPL
569436	2005 TP_{155}	—	October 9, 2005	Kitt Peak	Spacewatch	·	1.1 km	MPC · JPL
569437	2005 TS_{156}	—	October 9, 2005	Kitt Peak	Spacewatch	·	2.2 km	MPC · JPL
569438	2005 TB_{157}	—	October 9, 2005	Kitt Peak	Spacewatch	(31811)	2.5 km	MPC · JPL
569439	2005 TA_{159}	—	October 9, 2005	Kitt Peak	Spacewatch	·	720 m	MPC · JPL
569440	2005 TX_{165}	—	April 7, 2003	Kitt Peak	Spacewatch	·	1.5 km	MPC · JPL
569441	2005 TA_{167}	—	October 2, 2005	Mount Lemmon	Mount Lemmon Survey	·	2.6 km	MPC · JPL
569442	2005 TM_{167}	—	September 29, 2005	Mount Lemmon	Mount Lemmon Survey	·	600 m	MPC · JPL
569443	2005 TO_{167}	—	October 9, 2005	Kitt Peak	Spacewatch	·	1.0 km	MPC · JPL
569444	2005 TS_{179}	—	October 5, 2005	Mount Lemmon	Mount Lemmon Survey	·	2.4 km	MPC · JPL
569445	2005 TJ_{180}	—	October 1, 2005	Mount Lemmon	Mount Lemmon Survey	·	2.5 km	MPC · JPL
569446	2005 TF_{183}	—	September 3, 2005	Palomar	NEAT	H	670 m	MPC · JPL
569447	2005 TM_{184}	—	September 19, 1993	Kitt Peak	Spacewatch	·	870 m	MPC · JPL
569448	2005 TQ_{184}	—	October 1, 2005	Kitt Peak	Spacewatch	·	2.7 km	MPC · JPL
569449	2005 TQ_{186}	—	October 3, 2005	Kitt Peak	Spacewatch	·	2.6 km	MPC · JPL
569450	2005 TT_{186}	—	September 23, 2005	Kitt Peak	Spacewatch	·	2.5 km	MPC · JPL
569451	2005 TP_{187}	—	October 6, 2005	Mount Lemmon	Mount Lemmon Survey	EOS	1.5 km	MPC · JPL
569452	2005 TG_{196}	—	March 30, 2003	Kitt Peak	Spacewatch	·	1.5 km	MPC · JPL
569453	2005 TW_{197}	—	March 29, 2004	Kitt Peak	Spacewatch	·	600 m	MPC · JPL
569454	2005 TA_{198}	—	August 30, 2005	Palomar	NEAT	·	3.1 km	MPC · JPL
569455	2005 TV_{199}	—	October 10, 2005	Catalina	CSS	·	2.6 km	MPC · JPL
569456	2005 TT_{200}	—	February 9, 2013	Haleakala	Pan-STARRS 1	·	2.3 km	MPC · JPL
569457	2005 TA_{201}	—	February 23, 2007	Mount Lemmon	Mount Lemmon Survey	·	690 m	MPC · JPL
569458	2005 TF_{201}	—	February 21, 2007	Mount Lemmon	Mount Lemmon Survey	·	590 m	MPC · JPL
569459	2005 TO_{201}	—	April 20, 2014	Mount Lemmon	Mount Lemmon Survey	·	3.0 km	MPC · JPL
569460	2005 TA_{202}	—	October 1, 2005	Kitt Peak	Spacewatch	·	2.5 km	MPC · JPL
569461	2005 TC_{202}	—	December 13, 2010	Mount Lemmon	Mount Lemmon Survey	·	1.2 km	MPC · JPL
569462	2005 TD_{202}	—	October 13, 2005	Kitt Peak	Spacewatch	MAR	830 m	MPC · JPL
569463	2005 TJ_{202}	—	March 28, 2008	Kitt Peak	Spacewatch	·	950 m	MPC · JPL
569464	2005 TL_{202}	—	October 13, 2005	Kitt Peak	Spacewatch	·	2.1 km	MPC · JPL
569465	2005 TR_{203}	—	October 13, 2005	Kitt Peak	Spacewatch	·	2.5 km	MPC · JPL
569466	2005 TY_{203}	—	October 7, 2005	Kitt Peak	Spacewatch	·	510 m	MPC · JPL
569467	2005 TP_{205}	—	August 11, 2008	La Sagra	OAM	·	500 m	MPC · JPL
569468	2005 TH_{206}	—	February 9, 2008	Mount Lemmon	Mount Lemmon Survey	·	2.4 km	MPC · JPL
569469	2005 TM_{206}	—	October 1, 2005	Mount Lemmon	Mount Lemmon Survey	·	2.9 km	MPC · JPL
569470	2005 TA_{208}	—	August 8, 2016	Haleakala	Pan-STARRS 1	·	2.5 km	MPC · JPL
569471	2005 TA_{210}	—	January 27, 2007	Kitt Peak	Spacewatch	·	810 m	MPC · JPL
569472	2005 TR_{210}	—	March 30, 2012	Kitt Peak	Spacewatch	·	880 m	MPC · JPL
569473	2005 TU_{211}	—	December 21, 2006	Mount Lemmon	Mount Lemmon Survey	·	1.4 km	MPC · JPL
569474	2005 TY_{211}	—	October 1, 2005	Mount Lemmon	Mount Lemmon Survey	·	520 m	MPC · JPL
569475	2005 TJ_{212}	—	August 29, 2016	Mount Lemmon	Mount Lemmon Survey	·	2.5 km	MPC · JPL
569476	2005 TD_{213}	—	December 23, 2012	Haleakala	Pan-STARRS 1	·	2.1 km	MPC · JPL
569477	2005 TS_{213}	—	October 7, 2005	Mount Lemmon	Mount Lemmon Survey	·	1.4 km	MPC · JPL
569478	2005 TT_{213}	—	October 2, 2005	Mount Lemmon	Mount Lemmon Survey	VER	2.7 km	MPC · JPL
569479	2005 TZ_{214}	—	October 1, 2005	Mount Lemmon	Mount Lemmon Survey	EOS	1.6 km	MPC · JPL
569480	2005 TO_{215}	—	October 4, 2005	Mount Lemmon	Mount Lemmon Survey	·	2.6 km	MPC · JPL
569481	2005 TV_{216}	—	October 1, 2005	Mount Lemmon	Mount Lemmon Survey	VER	2.2 km	MPC · JPL
569482	2005 TU_{217}	—	October 1, 2005	Mount Lemmon	Mount Lemmon Survey	·	850 m	MPC · JPL
569483	2005 TE_{218}	—	October 12, 2005	Kitt Peak	Spacewatch	·	2.4 km	MPC · JPL
569484 Irisdement	2005 UC_{4}	Irisdement	October 26, 2005	Nogales	J.-C. Merlin	·	710 m	MPC · JPL
569485	2005 UZ_{6}	—	October 22, 2005	Great Shefford	Birtwhistle, P.	·	750 m	MPC · JPL
569486	2005 UK_{15}	—	October 5, 2005	Kitt Peak	Spacewatch	·	2.9 km	MPC · JPL
569487	2005 UK_{18}	—	October 22, 2005	Kitt Peak	Spacewatch	·	750 m	MPC · JPL
569488	2005 UZ_{20}	—	October 23, 2005	Kitt Peak	Spacewatch	·	1.1 km	MPC · JPL
569489	2005 UK_{22}	—	October 23, 2005	Kitt Peak	Spacewatch	EOS	1.8 km	MPC · JPL
569490	2005 UA_{27}	—	September 25, 2005	Palomar	NEAT	·	3.7 km	MPC · JPL
569491	2005 UO_{30}	—	September 30, 2005	Mount Lemmon	Mount Lemmon Survey	·	2.2 km	MPC · JPL
569492	2005 UF_{32}	—	October 24, 2005	Kitt Peak	Spacewatch	THM	1.9 km	MPC · JPL
569493	2005 UT_{48}	—	October 22, 2005	Kitt Peak	Spacewatch	·	710 m	MPC · JPL
569494	2005 US_{65}	—	August 27, 2005	Palomar	NEAT	·	2.4 km	MPC · JPL
569495	2005 UL_{74}	—	October 25, 2005	Anderson Mesa	LONEOS	·	4.4 km	MPC · JPL
569496	2005 UG_{90}	—	October 22, 2005	Kitt Peak	Spacewatch	·	1.8 km	MPC · JPL
569497	2005 UW_{90}	—	October 22, 2005	Kitt Peak	Spacewatch	·	690 m	MPC · JPL
569498	2005 UF_{92}	—	June 1, 2003	Cerro Tololo	Deep Ecliptic Survey	·	2.0 km	MPC · JPL
569499	2005 UN_{95}	—	October 22, 2005	Kitt Peak	Spacewatch	·	1.1 km	MPC · JPL
569500	2005 UU_{95}	—	October 22, 2005	Kitt Peak	Spacewatch	·	1.3 km	MPC · JPL

== 569501–569600 ==
back to top

Designation			Discovery			Properties		Ref
Permanent	Provisional	Named after	Date	Site	Discoverer(s)	Category	Diam.	Ref
569501	2005 UU_{99}	—	October 22, 2005	Kitt Peak	Spacewatch	·	620 m	MPC · JPL
569502	2005 UX_{99}	—	October 22, 2005	Kitt Peak	Spacewatch	·	1.9 km	MPC · JPL
569503	2005 UC_{105}	—	October 22, 2005	Kitt Peak	Spacewatch	·	1.4 km	MPC · JPL
569504	2005 UC_{119}	—	October 24, 2005	Kitt Peak	Spacewatch	(5)	860 m	MPC · JPL
569505	2005 UU_{121}	—	October 24, 2005	Kitt Peak	Spacewatch	·	1.4 km	MPC · JPL
569506	2005 UY_{129}	—	October 24, 2005	Kitt Peak	Spacewatch	·	2.6 km	MPC · JPL
569507	2005 UJ_{136}	—	October 11, 2005	Kitt Peak	Spacewatch	·	2.5 km	MPC · JPL
569508	2005 UD_{137}	—	September 30, 2005	Mount Lemmon	Mount Lemmon Survey	·	1.2 km	MPC · JPL
569509	2005 UH_{138}	—	October 25, 2005	Mount Lemmon	Mount Lemmon Survey	·	1.1 km	MPC · JPL
569510	2005 UE_{147}	—	October 26, 2005	Kitt Peak	Spacewatch	·	3.3 km	MPC · JPL
569511	2005 UW_{148}	—	October 26, 2005	Kitt Peak	Spacewatch	MAS	540 m	MPC · JPL
569512	2005 UE_{161}	—	October 22, 2005	Palomar	NEAT	·	830 m	MPC · JPL
569513	2005 UY_{190}	—	October 27, 2005	Mount Lemmon	Mount Lemmon Survey	·	2.7 km	MPC · JPL
569514	2005 US_{195}	—	September 29, 2005	Mount Lemmon	Mount Lemmon Survey	·	2.2 km	MPC · JPL
569515	2005 UP_{209}	—	October 22, 2005	Catalina	CSS	·	580 m	MPC · JPL
569516	2005 UO_{214}	—	October 26, 2005	Palomar	NEAT	·	1.5 km	MPC · JPL
569517	2005 UM_{234}	—	October 25, 2005	Kitt Peak	Spacewatch	·	2.8 km	MPC · JPL
569518	2005 UQ_{236}	—	October 25, 2005	Kitt Peak	Spacewatch	·	3.2 km	MPC · JPL
569519	2005 UW_{236}	—	October 25, 2005	Kitt Peak	Spacewatch	·	2.4 km	MPC · JPL
569520	2005 UB_{239}	—	October 25, 2005	Kitt Peak	Spacewatch	·	2.0 km	MPC · JPL
569521	2005 UT_{241}	—	October 25, 2005	Kitt Peak	Spacewatch	·	1.6 km	MPC · JPL
569522	2005 UQ_{242}	—	October 25, 2005	Kitt Peak	Spacewatch	·	650 m	MPC · JPL
569523	2005 UT_{259}	—	October 25, 2005	Kitt Peak	Spacewatch	THM	2.6 km	MPC · JPL
569524	2005 UW_{264}	—	October 27, 2005	Mount Lemmon	Mount Lemmon Survey	VER	2.2 km	MPC · JPL
569525	2005 UH_{266}	—	October 27, 2005	Kitt Peak	Spacewatch	·	1.3 km	MPC · JPL
569526	2005 UV_{268}	—	October 1, 2005	Mount Lemmon	Mount Lemmon Survey	·	2.7 km	MPC · JPL
569527	2005 UZ_{268}	—	October 28, 2005	Mount Lemmon	Mount Lemmon Survey	·	1.2 km	MPC · JPL
569528	2005 UP_{277}	—	October 24, 2005	Kitt Peak	Spacewatch	·	1.4 km	MPC · JPL
569529	2005 UU_{284}	—	October 26, 2005	Kitt Peak	Spacewatch	·	1.0 km	MPC · JPL
569530	2005 UB_{292}	—	October 26, 2005	Kitt Peak	Spacewatch	·	580 m	MPC · JPL
569531	2005 UU_{297}	—	October 26, 2005	Kitt Peak	Spacewatch	·	2.5 km	MPC · JPL
569532	2005 UQ_{300}	—	October 26, 2005	Kitt Peak	Spacewatch	·	2.7 km	MPC · JPL
569533	2005 UM_{301}	—	October 26, 2005	Kitt Peak	Spacewatch	·	570 m	MPC · JPL
569534	2005 UP_{303}	—	October 26, 2005	Kitt Peak	Spacewatch	·	1.2 km	MPC · JPL
569535	2005 UQ_{306}	—	October 27, 2005	Mount Lemmon	Mount Lemmon Survey	·	430 m	MPC · JPL
569536	2005 UX_{311}	—	September 25, 2005	Kitt Peak	Spacewatch	·	630 m	MPC · JPL
569537	2005 UE_{316}	—	October 25, 2005	Mount Lemmon	Mount Lemmon Survey	·	560 m	MPC · JPL
569538	2005 UT_{318}	—	October 27, 2005	Kitt Peak	Spacewatch	(5)	1.0 km	MPC · JPL
569539	2005 UF_{324}	—	September 30, 2005	Mount Lemmon	Mount Lemmon Survey	·	2.5 km	MPC · JPL
569540	2005 UC_{326}	—	October 29, 2005	Mount Lemmon	Mount Lemmon Survey	·	2.5 km	MPC · JPL
569541	2005 UO_{329}	—	October 28, 2005	Mount Lemmon	Mount Lemmon Survey	·	660 m	MPC · JPL
569542	2005 UA_{330}	—	October 28, 2005	Kitt Peak	Spacewatch	·	520 m	MPC · JPL
569543	2005 UE_{332}	—	October 29, 2005	Kitt Peak	Spacewatch	·	2.1 km	MPC · JPL
569544	2005 UY_{341}	—	October 31, 2005	Mount Lemmon	Mount Lemmon Survey	(2076)	730 m	MPC · JPL
569545	2005 UZ_{345}	—	October 30, 2005	Kitt Peak	Spacewatch	·	630 m	MPC · JPL
569546	2005 UP_{350}	—	August 30, 2005	Palomar	NEAT	·	3.4 km	MPC · JPL
569547	2005 UP_{351}	—	October 10, 2005	Moletai	K. Černis, Zdanavicius, J.	·	3.5 km	MPC · JPL
569548	2005 UG_{359}	—	October 25, 2005	Kitt Peak	Spacewatch	·	2.4 km	MPC · JPL
569549	2005 UZ_{360}	—	October 27, 2005	Kitt Peak	Spacewatch	·	1.1 km	MPC · JPL
569550	2005 UJ_{365}	—	October 27, 2005	Kitt Peak	Spacewatch	·	2.5 km	MPC · JPL
569551	2005 UZ_{366}	—	October 27, 2005	Kitt Peak	Spacewatch	·	1.3 km	MPC · JPL
569552	2005 UK_{370}	—	October 27, 2005	Kitt Peak	Spacewatch	·	450 m	MPC · JPL
569553	2005 UY_{370}	—	October 27, 2005	Kitt Peak	Spacewatch	·	2.2 km	MPC · JPL
569554	2005 UK_{371}	—	September 30, 2005	Mount Lemmon	Mount Lemmon Survey	(5)	1.0 km	MPC · JPL
569555	2005 UD_{375}	—	October 27, 2005	Kitt Peak	Spacewatch	·	2.6 km	MPC · JPL
569556	2005 UX_{376}	—	October 27, 2005	Kitt Peak	Spacewatch	·	1.3 km	MPC · JPL
569557	2005 UK_{377}	—	October 2, 2005	Mount Lemmon	Mount Lemmon Survey	·	2.4 km	MPC · JPL
569558	2005 UO_{384}	—	October 27, 2005	Kitt Peak	Spacewatch	·	1.2 km	MPC · JPL
569559	2005 UO_{392}	—	October 30, 2005	Mount Lemmon	Mount Lemmon Survey	·	930 m	MPC · JPL
569560	2005 UO_{393}	—	October 11, 2005	Kitt Peak	Spacewatch	·	2.2 km	MPC · JPL
569561	2005 US_{399}	—	October 25, 2005	Mount Lemmon	Mount Lemmon Survey	H	500 m	MPC · JPL
569562	2005 UF_{401}	—	October 27, 2005	Kitt Peak	Spacewatch	(5)	960 m	MPC · JPL
569563	2005 UW_{408}	—	September 29, 2005	Mount Lemmon	Mount Lemmon Survey	·	480 m	MPC · JPL
569564	2005 UY_{408}	—	October 12, 2005	Kitt Peak	Spacewatch	·	2.7 km	MPC · JPL
569565	2005 UO_{409}	—	October 31, 2005	Mount Lemmon	Mount Lemmon Survey	·	1.6 km	MPC · JPL
569566	2005 UH_{414}	—	October 25, 2005	Kitt Peak	Spacewatch	·	3.0 km	MPC · JPL
569567	2005 UB_{419}	—	October 25, 2005	Kitt Peak	Spacewatch	·	700 m	MPC · JPL
569568	2005 US_{421}	—	October 27, 2005	Mount Lemmon	Mount Lemmon Survey	·	2.5 km	MPC · JPL
569569	2005 UW_{423}	—	October 28, 2005	Kitt Peak	Spacewatch	·	2.4 km	MPC · JPL
569570	2005 UX_{427}	—	October 28, 2005	Kitt Peak	Spacewatch	·	1.2 km	MPC · JPL
569571	2005 UW_{429}	—	October 28, 2005	Kitt Peak	Spacewatch	KOR	1.0 km	MPC · JPL
569572	2005 UB_{430}	—	October 28, 2005	Kitt Peak	Spacewatch	·	990 m	MPC · JPL
569573	2005 UK_{431}	—	October 28, 2005	Kitt Peak	Spacewatch	·	2.4 km	MPC · JPL
569574	2005 UY_{437}	—	March 26, 2003	Kitt Peak	Spacewatch	MAR	1.0 km	MPC · JPL
569575	2005 UC_{452}	—	October 28, 2005	Catalina	CSS	·	1.6 km	MPC · JPL
569576	2005 UR_{452}	—	October 29, 2005	Kitt Peak	Spacewatch	·	2.4 km	MPC · JPL
569577	2005 UC_{456}	—	October 10, 2005	Anderson Mesa	LONEOS	·	680 m	MPC · JPL
569578	2005 UC_{463}	—	October 22, 2005	Kitt Peak	Spacewatch	KON	1.5 km	MPC · JPL
569579	2005 UN_{466}	—	October 30, 2005	Kitt Peak	Spacewatch	·	590 m	MPC · JPL
569580	2005 UX_{466}	—	October 30, 2005	Kitt Peak	Spacewatch	HYG	2.6 km	MPC · JPL
569581	2005 UU_{469}	—	October 30, 2005	Kitt Peak	Spacewatch	·	710 m	MPC · JPL
569582	2005 UG_{470}	—	October 30, 2005	Kitt Peak	Spacewatch	·	2.4 km	MPC · JPL
569583	2005 UN_{470}	—	October 30, 2005	Kitt Peak	Spacewatch	·	1.1 km	MPC · JPL
569584	2005 UR_{471}	—	September 30, 2005	Mount Lemmon	Mount Lemmon Survey	MAR	910 m	MPC · JPL
569585	2005 UE_{478}	—	October 27, 2005	Palomar	NEAT	·	2.1 km	MPC · JPL
569586	2005 UP_{487}	—	September 2, 2005	Palomar	NEAT	·	3.6 km	MPC · JPL
569587	2005 UO_{491}	—	October 24, 2005	Palomar	NEAT	H	500 m	MPC · JPL
569588	2005 UB_{499}	—	October 27, 2005	Catalina	CSS	·	680 m	MPC · JPL
569589	2005 UD_{502}	—	October 29, 2005	Catalina	CSS	EOS	2.0 km	MPC · JPL
569590	2005 UK_{503}	—	October 22, 2005	Kitt Peak	Spacewatch	·	590 m	MPC · JPL
569591	2005 UM_{507}	—	January 14, 2011	Kitt Peak	Spacewatch	·	1.2 km	MPC · JPL
569592	2005 US_{510}	—	October 25, 2005	Kitt Peak	Spacewatch	EUN	940 m	MPC · JPL
569593	2005 UK_{515}	—	June 14, 2004	Kitt Peak	Spacewatch	EOS	1.6 km	MPC · JPL
569594	2005 UO_{517}	—	October 30, 2005	Apache Point	SDSS Collaboration	EOS	1.5 km	MPC · JPL
569595	2005 UD_{518}	—	October 25, 2005	Apache Point	SDSS Collaboration	·	2.4 km	MPC · JPL
569596	2005 UJ_{518}	—	November 29, 2005	Kitt Peak	Spacewatch	·	2.4 km	MPC · JPL
569597	2005 UT_{518}	—	October 25, 2005	Apache Point	SDSS Collaboration	·	2.5 km	MPC · JPL
569598	2005 UV_{518}	—	October 30, 2005	Apache Point	SDSS Collaboration	·	2.6 km	MPC · JPL
569599	2005 UD_{519}	—	October 1, 2005	Apache Point	SDSS Collaboration	·	2.4 km	MPC · JPL
569600	2005 UQ_{520}	—	October 27, 2005	Apache Point	SDSS Collaboration	·	2.5 km	MPC · JPL

== 569601–569700 ==
back to top

Designation			Discovery			Properties		Ref
Permanent	Provisional	Named after	Date	Site	Discoverer(s)	Category	Diam.	Ref
569601	2005 UH_{522}	—	November 1, 2005	Catalina	CSS	BRG	1.2 km	MPC · JPL
569602	2005 UX_{523}	—	October 27, 2005	Apache Point	SDSS Collaboration	·	2.2 km	MPC · JPL
569603	2005 UN_{529}	—	October 26, 2005	Kitt Peak	Spacewatch	·	2.7 km	MPC · JPL
569604	2005 UZ_{530}	—	October 25, 2005	Mount Lemmon	Mount Lemmon Survey	·	1.2 km	MPC · JPL
569605	2005 UP_{531}	—	September 29, 2005	Mount Lemmon	Mount Lemmon Survey	·	2.3 km	MPC · JPL
569606	2005 UG_{533}	—	October 25, 2005	Mount Lemmon	Mount Lemmon Survey	·	2.7 km	MPC · JPL
569607	2005 UU_{533}	—	October 28, 2005	Mount Lemmon	Mount Lemmon Survey	·	520 m	MPC · JPL
569608	2005 UX_{533}	—	October 25, 2005	Kitt Peak	Spacewatch	·	1.1 km	MPC · JPL
569609	2005 UJ_{534}	—	October 28, 2005	Kitt Peak	Spacewatch	VER	2.6 km	MPC · JPL
569610	2005 UO_{534}	—	October 29, 2005	Kitt Peak	Spacewatch	EUN	1.0 km	MPC · JPL
569611	2005 UT_{534}	—	March 30, 2003	Kitt Peak	Deep Ecliptic Survey	·	1.3 km	MPC · JPL
569612	2005 UD_{535}	—	January 28, 2011	Mount Lemmon	Mount Lemmon Survey	·	1.5 km	MPC · JPL
569613	2005 UW_{535}	—	October 22, 2005	Kitt Peak	Spacewatch	·	940 m	MPC · JPL
569614	2005 UJ_{536}	—	July 27, 2015	Haleakala	Pan-STARRS 1	EOS	1.6 km	MPC · JPL
569615	2005 UT_{536}	—	February 17, 2010	Mount Lemmon	Mount Lemmon Survey	·	570 m	MPC · JPL
569616	2005 UE_{537}	—	October 25, 2005	Kitt Peak	Spacewatch	·	2.3 km	MPC · JPL
569617	2005 UF_{538}	—	November 12, 2012	Mount Lemmon	Mount Lemmon Survey	·	550 m	MPC · JPL
569618	2005 UJ_{538}	—	April 1, 2014	Mount Lemmon	Mount Lemmon Survey	THM	2.1 km	MPC · JPL
569619	2005 UA_{539}	—	March 10, 2011	Kitt Peak	Spacewatch	V	650 m	MPC · JPL
569620	2005 UD_{539}	—	August 16, 2009	Bergisch Gladbach	W. Bickel	·	1.5 km	MPC · JPL
569621	2005 UA_{540}	—	October 27, 2005	Mount Lemmon	Mount Lemmon Survey	·	1.3 km	MPC · JPL
569622	2005 UE_{540}	—	October 14, 2009	Catalina	CSS	·	880 m	MPC · JPL
569623	2005 UP_{540}	—	July 25, 2011	Haleakala	Pan-STARRS 1	·	550 m	MPC · JPL
569624	2005 UR_{540}	—	September 21, 2009	Mount Lemmon	Mount Lemmon Survey	·	1.2 km	MPC · JPL
569625	2005 UV_{540}	—	October 29, 2005	Catalina	CSS	·	1.3 km	MPC · JPL
569626	2005 UX_{540}	—	October 25, 2005	Mount Lemmon	Mount Lemmon Survey	·	560 m	MPC · JPL
569627	2005 UQ_{541}	—	October 24, 2005	Mauna Kea	A. Boattini	·	2.0 km	MPC · JPL
569628	2005 UO_{543}	—	May 24, 2014	Haleakala	Pan-STARRS 1	·	2.2 km	MPC · JPL
569629	2005 UR_{543}	—	October 24, 2011	Haleakala	Pan-STARRS 1	·	2.2 km	MPC · JPL
569630	2005 UY_{543}	—	March 20, 2007	Catalina	CSS	·	1.6 km	MPC · JPL
569631	2005 UZ_{543}	—	March 28, 2008	Mount Lemmon	Mount Lemmon Survey	·	2.1 km	MPC · JPL
569632	2005 UQ_{545}	—	March 6, 2008	Mount Lemmon	Mount Lemmon Survey	VER	2.3 km	MPC · JPL
569633	2005 UP_{546}	—	September 11, 2010	Mount Lemmon	Mount Lemmon Survey	·	2.4 km	MPC · JPL
569634	2005 UQ_{547}	—	October 27, 2005	Kitt Peak	Spacewatch	·	1.4 km	MPC · JPL
569635	2005 UV_{547}	—	October 25, 2005	Mount Lemmon	Mount Lemmon Survey	BRG	1.2 km	MPC · JPL
569636	2005 UV_{548}	—	October 22, 2005	Kitt Peak	Spacewatch	·	2.2 km	MPC · JPL
569637	2005 UG_{550}	—	October 31, 2005	Mount Lemmon	Mount Lemmon Survey	·	2.5 km	MPC · JPL
569638	2005 UT_{550}	—	October 27, 2005	Kitt Peak	Spacewatch	·	2.5 km	MPC · JPL
569639	2005 UD_{551}	—	October 29, 2005	Mount Lemmon	Mount Lemmon Survey	·	2.5 km	MPC · JPL
569640	2005 UH_{552}	—	October 27, 2005	Kitt Peak	Spacewatch	·	1.1 km	MPC · JPL
569641	2005 VZ_{2}	—	November 6, 2005	Pla D'Arguines	R. Ferrando, Ferrando, M.	·	840 m	MPC · JPL
569642	2005 VL_{8}	—	November 1, 2005	Kitt Peak	Spacewatch	·	2.3 km	MPC · JPL
569643	2005 VM_{10}	—	October 26, 2005	Anderson Mesa	LONEOS	·	670 m	MPC · JPL
569644	2005 VE_{13}	—	October 27, 2005	Kitt Peak	Spacewatch	·	2.8 km	MPC · JPL
569645	2005 VJ_{24}	—	November 1, 2005	Kitt Peak	Spacewatch	TIR	2.6 km	MPC · JPL
569646	2005 VW_{24}	—	October 24, 2005	Kitt Peak	Spacewatch	THM	1.9 km	MPC · JPL
569647	2005 VP_{30}	—	November 4, 2005	Kitt Peak	Spacewatch	TIR	2.5 km	MPC · JPL
569648	2005 VX_{30}	—	November 4, 2005	Kitt Peak	Spacewatch	·	670 m	MPC · JPL
569649	2005 VU_{31}	—	October 25, 2005	Mount Lemmon	Mount Lemmon Survey	·	1.4 km	MPC · JPL
569650	2005 VN_{44}	—	November 3, 2005	Mount Lemmon	Mount Lemmon Survey	(5)	1.2 km	MPC · JPL
569651	2005 VD_{45}	—	November 4, 2005	Kitt Peak	Spacewatch	·	2.8 km	MPC · JPL
569652	2005 VO_{50}	—	September 2, 2005	Palomar	NEAT	·	3.4 km	MPC · JPL
569653	2005 VH_{57}	—	November 4, 2005	Mount Lemmon	Mount Lemmon Survey	HYG	3.0 km	MPC · JPL
569654	2005 VR_{59}	—	November 5, 2005	Kitt Peak	Spacewatch	VER	2.1 km	MPC · JPL
569655	2005 VM_{62}	—	September 1, 2005	Kitt Peak	Spacewatch	·	2.4 km	MPC · JPL
569656	2005 VT_{64}	—	November 4, 2005	Kitt Peak	Spacewatch	·	1.5 km	MPC · JPL
569657	2005 VV_{64}	—	November 4, 2005	Kitt Peak	Spacewatch	THM	2.0 km	MPC · JPL
569658	2005 VZ_{66}	—	October 25, 2005	Kitt Peak	Spacewatch	·	1.3 km	MPC · JPL
569659	2005 VY_{77}	—	November 6, 2005	Socorro	LINEAR	·	3.0 km	MPC · JPL
569660	2005 VG_{78}	—	October 25, 2005	Catalina	CSS	·	740 m	MPC · JPL
569661	2005 VV_{82}	—	November 3, 2005	Kitt Peak	Spacewatch	·	630 m	MPC · JPL
569662	2005 VS_{84}	—	November 4, 2005	Kitt Peak	Spacewatch	·	620 m	MPC · JPL
569663	2005 VT_{84}	—	October 26, 2005	Kitt Peak	Spacewatch	MAR	1.0 km	MPC · JPL
569664	2005 VA_{95}	—	November 6, 2005	Kitt Peak	Spacewatch	·	2.3 km	MPC · JPL
569665	2005 VZ_{101}	—	October 25, 2005	Catalina	CSS	H	630 m	MPC · JPL
569666	2005 VV_{102}	—	August 31, 2005	Palomar	NEAT	·	2.7 km	MPC · JPL
569667	2005 VY_{106}	—	October 29, 2005	Catalina	CSS	·	520 m	MPC · JPL
569668	2005 VC_{115}	—	November 11, 2005	Kitt Peak	Spacewatch	·	3.4 km	MPC · JPL
569669	2005 VF_{115}	—	November 11, 2005	Kitt Peak	Spacewatch	·	1.7 km	MPC · JPL
569670	2005 VD_{126}	—	October 27, 2005	Apache Point	SDSS Collaboration	·	2.2 km	MPC · JPL
569671	2005 VR_{126}	—	October 1, 2005	Mount Lemmon	Mount Lemmon Survey	·	440 m	MPC · JPL
569672	2005 VU_{127}	—	October 27, 2005	Apache Point	SDSS Collaboration	·	1.6 km	MPC · JPL
569673	2005 VD_{129}	—	December 1, 2005	Mount Lemmon	Mount Lemmon Survey	·	1.1 km	MPC · JPL
569674	2005 VT_{129}	—	October 23, 2005	Apache Point	SDSS Collaboration	·	2.9 km	MPC · JPL
569675	2005 VC_{131}	—	September 29, 2005	Kitt Peak	Spacewatch	·	1.4 km	MPC · JPL
569676	2005 VP_{132}	—	October 30, 2005	Apache Point	SDSS Collaboration	·	2.9 km	MPC · JPL
569677	2005 VF_{133}	—	October 26, 2005	Apache Point	SDSS Collaboration	·	2.6 km	MPC · JPL
569678	2005 VW_{137}	—	November 7, 2005	Mauna Kea	A. Boattini	·	1.5 km	MPC · JPL
569679	2005 VR_{138}	—	April 20, 2007	Kitt Peak	Spacewatch	·	730 m	MPC · JPL
569680	2005 VW_{138}	—	August 24, 2008	Kitt Peak	Spacewatch	·	670 m	MPC · JPL
569681	2005 VE_{139}	—	October 1, 2010	Mount Lemmon	Mount Lemmon Survey	·	2.8 km	MPC · JPL
569682	2005 VX_{139}	—	October 9, 2015	Haleakala	Pan-STARRS 1	·	580 m	MPC · JPL
569683	2005 VL_{140}	—	November 1, 2005	Mount Lemmon	Mount Lemmon Survey	·	2.2 km	MPC · JPL
569684	2005 VY_{140}	—	April 4, 2008	Mount Lemmon	Mount Lemmon Survey	·	2.5 km	MPC · JPL
569685	2005 VE_{141}	—	December 28, 2011	Mount Lemmon	Mount Lemmon Survey	·	2.4 km	MPC · JPL
569686	2005 VS_{141}	—	September 19, 2010	Kitt Peak	Spacewatch	·	2.3 km	MPC · JPL
569687	2005 VX_{141}	—	April 29, 2014	Haleakala	Pan-STARRS 1	·	2.8 km	MPC · JPL
569688	2005 VD_{143}	—	November 1, 2005	Kitt Peak	Spacewatch	·	1.3 km	MPC · JPL
569689	2005 VG_{143}	—	November 3, 2005	Mount Lemmon	Mount Lemmon Survey	EUN	1.2 km	MPC · JPL
569690	2005 VH_{143}	—	September 5, 2010	Mount Lemmon	Mount Lemmon Survey	EOS	1.9 km	MPC · JPL
569691	2005 VP_{144}	—	November 12, 2005	Kitt Peak	Spacewatch	·	1.5 km	MPC · JPL
569692	2005 VB_{149}	—	March 22, 2014	Calar Alto	Calar Alto	·	2.5 km	MPC · JPL
569693	2005 VZ_{149}	—	May 4, 2014	Haleakala	Pan-STARRS 1	·	2.5 km	MPC · JPL
569694	2005 VA_{151}	—	November 6, 2005	Mount Lemmon	Mount Lemmon Survey	·	1.1 km	MPC · JPL
569695	2005 VF_{151}	—	November 7, 2005	Mauna Kea	A. Boattini	·	1.7 km	MPC · JPL
569696	2005 VH_{151}	—	November 3, 2005	Kitt Peak	Spacewatch	·	1.8 km	MPC · JPL
569697	2005 VJ_{151}	—	November 12, 2005	Kitt Peak	Spacewatch	·	2.6 km	MPC · JPL
569698	2005 VO_{151}	—	November 6, 2005	Mount Lemmon	Mount Lemmon Survey	·	560 m	MPC · JPL
569699	2005 VQ_{151}	—	November 6, 2005	Mount Lemmon	Mount Lemmon Survey	NYS	690 m	MPC · JPL
569700	2005 VV_{151}	—	November 1, 2005	Mount Lemmon	Mount Lemmon Survey	·	2.4 km	MPC · JPL

== 569701–569800 ==
back to top

Designation			Discovery			Properties		Ref
Permanent	Provisional	Named after	Date	Site	Discoverer(s)	Category	Diam.	Ref
569701	2005 VW_{151}	—	November 12, 2005	Kitt Peak	Spacewatch	·	1.1 km	MPC · JPL
569702	2005 VZ_{153}	—	November 4, 2005	Kitt Peak	Spacewatch	·	1.5 km	MPC · JPL
569703	2005 WO_{6}	—	October 28, 2005	Mount Lemmon	Mount Lemmon Survey	·	2.5 km	MPC · JPL
569704	2005 WN_{7}	—	November 21, 2005	Kitt Peak	Spacewatch	·	2.6 km	MPC · JPL
569705	2005 WK_{8}	—	November 12, 2005	Kitt Peak	Spacewatch	·	640 m	MPC · JPL
569706	2005 WH_{12}	—	November 22, 2005	Kitt Peak	Spacewatch	·	3.1 km	MPC · JPL
569707	2005 WP_{12}	—	November 3, 2005	Kitt Peak	Spacewatch	·	3.1 km	MPC · JPL
569708	2005 WT_{12}	—	October 27, 2005	Mount Lemmon	Mount Lemmon Survey	·	3.4 km	MPC · JPL
569709	2005 WQ_{14}	—	October 25, 2005	Mount Lemmon	Mount Lemmon Survey	·	1.5 km	MPC · JPL
569710	2005 WE_{17}	—	November 10, 2005	Mount Lemmon	Mount Lemmon Survey	·	2.4 km	MPC · JPL
569711	2005 WY_{19}	—	October 28, 2005	Mount Lemmon	Mount Lemmon Survey	·	630 m	MPC · JPL
569712	2005 WO_{20}	—	October 30, 2005	Mount Lemmon	Mount Lemmon Survey	·	3.2 km	MPC · JPL
569713	2005 WA_{43}	—	October 27, 2005	Mount Lemmon	Mount Lemmon Survey	·	2.7 km	MPC · JPL
569714	2005 WZ_{43}	—	November 21, 2005	Kitt Peak	Spacewatch	HNS	780 m	MPC · JPL
569715	2005 WJ_{46}	—	October 30, 2005	Kitt Peak	Spacewatch	·	810 m	MPC · JPL
569716	2005 WT_{49}	—	November 25, 2005	Mount Lemmon	Mount Lemmon Survey	·	1.5 km	MPC · JPL
569717	2005 WB_{52}	—	November 25, 2005	Mount Lemmon	Mount Lemmon Survey	·	1.3 km	MPC · JPL
569718	2005 WM_{53}	—	November 4, 2005	Kitt Peak	Spacewatch	·	1.4 km	MPC · JPL
569719	2005 WB_{55}	—	November 25, 2005	Kitt Peak	Spacewatch	·	1.3 km	MPC · JPL
569720	2005 WN_{60}	—	November 25, 2005	Great Shefford	Birtwhistle, P.	·	1.4 km	MPC · JPL
569721	2005 WG_{61}	—	November 25, 2005	Kitt Peak	Spacewatch	·	1.3 km	MPC · JPL
569722	2005 WD_{63}	—	November 25, 2005	Kitt Peak	Spacewatch	·	2.2 km	MPC · JPL
569723	2005 WU_{68}	—	August 26, 2000	Cerro Tololo	Deep Ecliptic Survey	·	1.2 km	MPC · JPL
569724	2005 WR_{75}	—	November 6, 2005	Kitt Peak	Spacewatch	·	2.8 km	MPC · JPL
569725	2005 WQ_{79}	—	November 25, 2005	Kitt Peak	Spacewatch	·	730 m	MPC · JPL
569726	2005 WJ_{84}	—	January 26, 2003	Palomar	NEAT	·	740 m	MPC · JPL
569727	2005 WD_{86}	—	October 25, 2005	Mount Lemmon	Mount Lemmon Survey	·	2.3 km	MPC · JPL
569728	2005 WG_{86}	—	November 22, 2005	Kitt Peak	Spacewatch	VER	2.8 km	MPC · JPL
569729	2005 WQ_{90}	—	October 25, 2005	Anderson Mesa	LONEOS	·	1.7 km	MPC · JPL
569730	2005 WJ_{92}	—	November 25, 2005	Mount Lemmon	Mount Lemmon Survey	·	1.6 km	MPC · JPL
569731	2005 WT_{96}	—	November 26, 2005	Kitt Peak	Spacewatch	·	1.2 km	MPC · JPL
569732	2005 WM_{109}	—	November 10, 2005	Mount Lemmon	Mount Lemmon Survey	·	2.6 km	MPC · JPL
569733	2005 WY_{109}	—	November 30, 2005	Kitt Peak	Spacewatch	·	1.1 km	MPC · JPL
569734	2005 WA_{122}	—	November 22, 2005	Kitt Peak	Spacewatch	·	2.6 km	MPC · JPL
569735	2005 WO_{122}	—	October 1, 2005	Catalina	CSS	·	3.1 km	MPC · JPL
569736	2005 WH_{128}	—	November 25, 2005	Mount Lemmon	Mount Lemmon Survey	·	1.1 km	MPC · JPL
569737	2005 WK_{130}	—	November 25, 2005	Mount Lemmon	Mount Lemmon Survey	·	1.3 km	MPC · JPL
569738	2005 WT_{139}	—	November 26, 2005	Mount Lemmon	Mount Lemmon Survey	·	1.8 km	MPC · JPL
569739	2005 WP_{141}	—	November 28, 2005	Mount Lemmon	Mount Lemmon Survey	·	1.8 km	MPC · JPL
569740	2005 WB_{146}	—	November 25, 2005	Kitt Peak	Spacewatch	·	1.4 km	MPC · JPL
569741	2005 WJ_{148}	—	October 11, 2005	Uccle	P. De Cat	·	3.2 km	MPC · JPL
569742	2005 WG_{149}	—	November 28, 2005	Kitt Peak	Spacewatch	·	1.7 km	MPC · JPL
569743	2005 WJ_{153}	—	November 29, 2005	Kitt Peak	Spacewatch	·	580 m	MPC · JPL
569744	2005 WV_{153}	—	November 29, 2005	Kitt Peak	Spacewatch	·	2.7 km	MPC · JPL
569745	2005 WP_{155}	—	November 29, 2005	Kitt Peak	Spacewatch	·	610 m	MPC · JPL
569746	2005 WG_{165}	—	November 5, 2005	Mount Lemmon	Mount Lemmon Survey	·	1.5 km	MPC · JPL
569747	2005 WK_{170}	—	November 30, 2005	Kitt Peak	Spacewatch	(5)	1.0 km	MPC · JPL
569748	2005 WG_{172}	—	October 25, 2005	Mount Lemmon	Mount Lemmon Survey	(3460)	2.3 km	MPC · JPL
569749	2005 WQ_{181}	—	November 25, 2005	Catalina	CSS	·	3.1 km	MPC · JPL
569750	2005 WC_{182}	—	November 20, 2005	Palomar	NEAT	·	1.6 km	MPC · JPL
569751	2005 WN_{193}	—	November 28, 2005	Palomar	NEAT	·	2.3 km	MPC · JPL
569752	2005 WT_{198}	—	November 25, 2005	Kitt Peak	Spacewatch	·	1.8 km	MPC · JPL
569753	2005 WK_{200}	—	November 26, 2005	Kitt Peak	Spacewatch	·	1.4 km	MPC · JPL
569754	2005 WV_{200}	—	November 26, 2005	Kitt Peak	Spacewatch	·	730 m	MPC · JPL
569755	2005 WY_{200}	—	November 26, 2005	Kitt Peak	Spacewatch	EUN	1.2 km	MPC · JPL
569756	2005 WC_{201}	—	November 26, 2005	Kitt Peak	Spacewatch	·	720 m	MPC · JPL
569757	2005 WP_{201}	—	November 29, 2005	Kitt Peak	Spacewatch	EUN	1.1 km	MPC · JPL
569758	2005 WX_{201}	—	January 29, 2003	Apache Point	SDSS Collaboration	·	600 m	MPC · JPL
569759	2005 WD_{202}	—	November 29, 2005	Kitt Peak	Spacewatch	·	1 km	MPC · JPL
569760	2005 WK_{203}	—	October 27, 2005	Catalina	CSS	JUN	820 m	MPC · JPL
569761	2005 WT_{204}	—	October 25, 2005	Kitt Peak	Spacewatch	·	2.2 km	MPC · JPL
569762	2005 WK_{208}	—	November 26, 2005	Kitt Peak	Spacewatch	·	1.6 km	MPC · JPL
569763	2005 WQ_{210}	—	November 28, 2005	Mount Lemmon	Mount Lemmon Survey	·	1.3 km	MPC · JPL
569764	2005 WU_{212}	—	November 29, 2005	Kitt Peak	Spacewatch	·	650 m	MPC · JPL
569765	2005 WU_{213}	—	November 28, 2005	Kitt Peak	Spacewatch	TIR	2.2 km	MPC · JPL
569766	2005 WO_{214}	—	November 21, 2017	Haleakala	Pan-STARRS 1	·	2.7 km	MPC · JPL
569767	2005 WS_{214}	—	November 30, 2005	Mount Lemmon	Mount Lemmon Survey	·	2.6 km	MPC · JPL
569768	2005 WT_{214}	—	January 17, 2015	Haleakala	Pan-STARRS 1	·	1.3 km	MPC · JPL
569769	2005 WY_{215}	—	March 4, 2013	Haleakala	Pan-STARRS 1	·	2.5 km	MPC · JPL
569770	2005 WC_{216}	—	November 15, 1995	Kitt Peak	Spacewatch	·	1.9 km	MPC · JPL
569771	2005 XT_{4}	—	November 9, 2005	Catalina	CSS	·	2.5 km	MPC · JPL
569772	2005 XQ_{6}	—	November 21, 2005	Kitt Peak	Spacewatch	·	3.0 km	MPC · JPL
569773	2005 XM_{8}	—	December 7, 2005	Catalina	CSS	·	1.2 km	MPC · JPL
569774	2005 XJ_{10}	—	December 1, 2005	Kitt Peak	Spacewatch	·	1.4 km	MPC · JPL
569775	2005 XL_{10}	—	December 1, 2005	Kitt Peak	Spacewatch	·	2.7 km	MPC · JPL
569776	2005 XM_{10}	—	December 1, 2005	Kitt Peak	Spacewatch	·	2.3 km	MPC · JPL
569777	2005 XG_{17}	—	December 1, 2005	Kitt Peak	Spacewatch	·	1.9 km	MPC · JPL
569778	2005 XH_{20}	—	October 5, 2005	Kitt Peak	Spacewatch	EOS	2.0 km	MPC · JPL
569779	2005 XY_{23}	—	December 2, 2005	Mount Lemmon	Mount Lemmon Survey	·	3.1 km	MPC · JPL
569780	2005 XW_{29}	—	December 1, 2005	Kitt Peak	Spacewatch	·	2.0 km	MPC · JPL
569781	2005 XN_{33}	—	November 26, 2005	Kitt Peak	Spacewatch	·	3.3 km	MPC · JPL
569782	2005 XR_{37}	—	December 4, 2005	Kitt Peak	Spacewatch	EOS	1.3 km	MPC · JPL
569783	2005 XV_{38}	—	December 5, 2005	Kitt Peak	Spacewatch	·	660 m	MPC · JPL
569784	2005 XL_{43}	—	November 6, 2005	Mount Lemmon	Mount Lemmon Survey	·	1.2 km	MPC · JPL
569785	2005 XB_{47}	—	December 2, 2005	Kitt Peak	Spacewatch	·	540 m	MPC · JPL
569786	2005 XX_{47}	—	December 2, 2005	Kitt Peak	Spacewatch	HNS	1.2 km	MPC · JPL
569787	2005 XB_{48}	—	December 2, 2005	Kitt Peak	Spacewatch	·	640 m	MPC · JPL
569788	2005 XV_{48}	—	November 25, 2005	Kitt Peak	Spacewatch	·	1.3 km	MPC · JPL
569789	2005 XK_{58}	—	December 2, 2005	Mount Lemmon	Mount Lemmon Survey	·	1.3 km	MPC · JPL
569790	2005 XB_{60}	—	December 3, 2005	Kitt Peak	Spacewatch	·	2.4 km	MPC · JPL
569791	2005 XR_{60}	—	November 10, 2005	Mount Lemmon	Mount Lemmon Survey	·	690 m	MPC · JPL
569792	2005 XR_{62}	—	December 5, 2005	Mount Lemmon	Mount Lemmon Survey	H	450 m	MPC · JPL
569793	2005 XB_{71}	—	December 6, 2005	Kitt Peak	Spacewatch	·	640 m	MPC · JPL
569794	2005 XA_{72}	—	December 6, 2005	Kitt Peak	Spacewatch	·	1.4 km	MPC · JPL
569795	2005 XP_{74}	—	December 6, 2005	Kitt Peak	Spacewatch	·	1.1 km	MPC · JPL
569796	2005 XQ_{74}	—	December 6, 2005	Kitt Peak	Spacewatch	·	3.2 km	MPC · JPL
569797	2005 XN_{79}	—	December 2, 2005	Kitt Peak	Spacewatch	·	880 m	MPC · JPL
569798	2005 XA_{89}	—	December 6, 2005	Kitt Peak	Spacewatch	·	890 m	MPC · JPL
569799	2005 XR_{90}	—	December 8, 2005	Kitt Peak	Spacewatch	HNS	1.1 km	MPC · JPL
569800	2005 XX_{91}	—	December 2, 2005	Catalina	CSS	·	3.8 km	MPC · JPL

== 569801–569900 ==
back to top

Designation			Discovery			Properties		Ref
Permanent	Provisional	Named after	Date	Site	Discoverer(s)	Category	Diam.	Ref
569801	2005 XL_{93}	—	December 1, 2005	Kitt Peak	Wasserman, L. H., Millis, R. L.	·	2.7 km	MPC · JPL
569802	2005 XW_{93}	—	August 30, 2005	Kitt Peak	Spacewatch	3:2 · SHU	5.0 km	MPC · JPL
569803	2005 XN_{106}	—	December 1, 2005	Kitt Peak	Wasserman, L. H., Millis, R. L.	·	560 m	MPC · JPL
569804	2005 XP_{107}	—	October 28, 2005	Kitt Peak	Spacewatch	·	1.2 km	MPC · JPL
569805	2005 XU_{107}	—	November 11, 2005	Kitt Peak	Spacewatch	·	1.3 km	MPC · JPL
569806	2005 XW_{109}	—	December 6, 2005	Mount Lemmon	Mount Lemmon Survey	·	2.3 km	MPC · JPL
569807	2005 XS_{111}	—	November 12, 2005	Kitt Peak	Spacewatch	VER	2.7 km	MPC · JPL
569808	2005 XO_{112}	—	December 3, 2005	Mauna Kea	A. Boattini	·	2.0 km	MPC · JPL
569809	2005 XU_{116}	—	December 6, 2005	Kitt Peak	Spacewatch	·	1.0 km	MPC · JPL
569810	2005 XZ_{116}	—	December 4, 2005	Kitt Peak	Spacewatch	JUN	1.4 km	MPC · JPL
569811	2005 XH_{120}	—	March 9, 2011	Mount Lemmon	Mount Lemmon Survey	·	1.4 km	MPC · JPL
569812	2005 XK_{120}	—	December 7, 2005	Kitt Peak	Spacewatch	·	3.5 km	MPC · JPL
569813	2005 XO_{120}	—	July 14, 2013	Haleakala	Pan-STARRS 1	·	1.1 km	MPC · JPL
569814	2005 XB_{121}	—	December 1, 2005	Mount Lemmon	Mount Lemmon Survey	·	1.8 km	MPC · JPL
569815	2005 XC_{121}	—	October 6, 2008	Mount Lemmon	Mount Lemmon Survey	·	590 m	MPC · JPL
569816	2005 XH_{121}	—	January 5, 2013	Kitt Peak	Spacewatch	·	650 m	MPC · JPL
569817	2005 XL_{121}	—	December 6, 2005	Kitt Peak	Spacewatch	·	2.7 km	MPC · JPL
569818	2005 XU_{121}	—	March 16, 2007	Kitt Peak	Spacewatch	·	780 m	MPC · JPL
569819	2005 XF_{122}	—	November 26, 2009	Kitt Peak	Spacewatch	·	790 m	MPC · JPL
569820	2005 XH_{122}	—	November 13, 2010	Mount Lemmon	Mount Lemmon Survey	·	1.9 km	MPC · JPL
569821	2005 XO_{122}	—	November 9, 2009	Kitt Peak	Spacewatch	·	1.6 km	MPC · JPL
569822	2005 XB_{123}	—	September 17, 1996	Kitt Peak	Spacewatch	·	1.2 km	MPC · JPL
569823	2005 XK_{123}	—	May 26, 2015	Haleakala	Pan-STARRS 1	PHO	1.1 km	MPC · JPL
569824	2005 XO_{123}	—	September 28, 2013	Piszkés-tető	K. Sárneczky, S. Kürti	·	1.3 km	MPC · JPL
569825	2005 XQ_{123}	—	December 22, 2012	Haleakala	Pan-STARRS 1	·	3.6 km	MPC · JPL
569826	2005 XS_{123}	—	January 2, 2012	Mount Lemmon	Mount Lemmon Survey	·	2.8 km	MPC · JPL
569827	2005 XM_{124}	—	December 2, 2005	Kitt Peak	Wasserman, L. H., Millis, R. L.	·	1.3 km	MPC · JPL
569828	2005 XT_{124}	—	October 16, 2013	Mount Lemmon	Mount Lemmon Survey	H	510 m	MPC · JPL
569829	2005 XH_{125}	—	October 1, 2008	Kitt Peak	Spacewatch	AGN	1.1 km	MPC · JPL
569830	2005 XS_{125}	—	January 30, 2011	Mount Lemmon	Mount Lemmon Survey	·	850 m	MPC · JPL
569831	2005 XY_{125}	—	December 3, 2005	Mauna Kea	A. Boattini	·	1.5 km	MPC · JPL
569832	2005 XJ_{126}	—	October 13, 2010	Bergisch Gladbach	W. Bickel	VER	2.4 km	MPC · JPL
569833	2005 XX_{126}	—	August 24, 2017	Haleakala	Pan-STARRS 1	EUN	1.1 km	MPC · JPL
569834	2005 XO_{127}	—	November 3, 2005	Mount Lemmon	Mount Lemmon Survey	·	1.0 km	MPC · JPL
569835	2005 XA_{128}	—	December 4, 2005	Mount Lemmon	Mount Lemmon Survey	·	1.3 km	MPC · JPL
569836	2005 XS_{128}	—	December 10, 2005	Kitt Peak	Spacewatch	(2076)	590 m	MPC · JPL
569837	2005 XC_{129}	—	December 1, 2005	Kitt Peak	Spacewatch	H	480 m	MPC · JPL
569838	2005 XE_{129}	—	March 4, 2013	Haleakala	Pan-STARRS 1	·	2.7 km	MPC · JPL
569839	2005 XN_{129}	—	September 13, 2013	Catalina	CSS	·	1.5 km	MPC · JPL
569840	2005 XP_{129}	—	April 12, 2016	Haleakala	Pan-STARRS 1	·	1.1 km	MPC · JPL
569841	2005 XY_{129}	—	January 16, 2018	Haleakala	Pan-STARRS 1	·	1.9 km	MPC · JPL
569842	2005 XC_{130}	—	December 1, 2005	Mount Lemmon	Mount Lemmon Survey	GEF	1.1 km	MPC · JPL
569843	2005 XF_{132}	—	December 5, 2005	Kitt Peak	Spacewatch	·	1.8 km	MPC · JPL
569844	2005 XT_{132}	—	December 2, 2005	Mauna Kea	A. Boattini	HOF	1.9 km	MPC · JPL
569845	2005 XA_{133}	—	December 10, 2005	Kitt Peak	Spacewatch	·	2.8 km	MPC · JPL
569846	2005 XJ_{133}	—	December 5, 2005	Kitt Peak	Spacewatch	·	980 m	MPC · JPL
569847	2005 YK_{3}	—	December 22, 2005	Catalina	CSS	·	3.0 km	MPC · JPL
569848	2005 YW_{4}	—	November 25, 2005	Kitt Peak	Spacewatch	·	1.7 km	MPC · JPL
569849	2005 YT_{10}	—	December 21, 2005	Kitt Peak	Spacewatch	EUN	1.3 km	MPC · JPL
569850	2005 YS_{15}	—	December 22, 2005	Kitt Peak	Spacewatch	V	710 m	MPC · JPL
569851	2005 YS_{16}	—	December 22, 2005	Kitt Peak	Spacewatch	·	1.5 km	MPC · JPL
569852	2005 YD_{18}	—	November 28, 2005	Kitt Peak	Spacewatch	·	2.5 km	MPC · JPL
569853	2005 YQ_{18}	—	December 23, 2005	Kitt Peak	Spacewatch	·	1.4 km	MPC · JPL
569854	2005 YB_{20}	—	December 24, 2005	Kitt Peak	Spacewatch	·	2.8 km	MPC · JPL
569855	2005 YN_{20}	—	December 24, 2005	Kitt Peak	Spacewatch	·	530 m	MPC · JPL
569856	2005 YA_{22}	—	December 24, 2005	Kitt Peak	Spacewatch	·	490 m	MPC · JPL
569857	2005 YJ_{33}	—	December 4, 2005	Mount Lemmon	Mount Lemmon Survey	·	1.0 km	MPC · JPL
569858	2005 YT_{44}	—	December 25, 2005	Kitt Peak	Spacewatch	·	3.6 km	MPC · JPL
569859	2005 YX_{53}	—	December 24, 2005	Kitt Peak	Spacewatch	·	1.2 km	MPC · JPL
569860	2005 YR_{57}	—	December 24, 2005	Kitt Peak	Spacewatch	NEM	1.7 km	MPC · JPL
569861	2005 YD_{60}	—	December 22, 2005	Kitt Peak	Spacewatch	GEF	870 m	MPC · JPL
569862	2005 YV_{65}	—	November 1, 2005	Mount Lemmon	Mount Lemmon Survey	·	1.4 km	MPC · JPL
569863	2005 YE_{75}	—	December 24, 2005	Kitt Peak	Spacewatch	·	810 m	MPC · JPL
569864	2005 YT_{77}	—	December 5, 2005	Mount Lemmon	Mount Lemmon Survey	EUN	1.2 km	MPC · JPL
569865	2005 YE_{78}	—	December 24, 2005	Kitt Peak	Spacewatch	EOS	1.9 km	MPC · JPL
569866	2005 YA_{80}	—	December 24, 2005	Kitt Peak	Spacewatch	·	2.5 km	MPC · JPL
569867	2005 YH_{82}	—	December 24, 2005	Kitt Peak	Spacewatch	·	1.4 km	MPC · JPL
569868	2005 YG_{83}	—	December 5, 2005	Mount Lemmon	Mount Lemmon Survey	H	520 m	MPC · JPL
569869	2005 YR_{88}	—	December 25, 2005	Mount Lemmon	Mount Lemmon Survey	·	1.5 km	MPC · JPL
569870	2005 YD_{93}	—	December 27, 2005	Kitt Peak	Spacewatch	·	1.1 km	MPC · JPL
569871	2005 YA_{102}	—	November 29, 2005	Mount Lemmon	Mount Lemmon Survey	·	1.6 km	MPC · JPL
569872	2005 YO_{102}	—	December 25, 2005	Kitt Peak	Spacewatch	·	1.3 km	MPC · JPL
569873	2005 YQ_{102}	—	December 25, 2005	Kitt Peak	Spacewatch	(5)	1 km	MPC · JPL
569874	2005 YV_{108}	—	December 25, 2005	Kitt Peak	Spacewatch	NEM	1.7 km	MPC · JPL
569875	2005 YE_{109}	—	December 25, 2005	Kitt Peak	Spacewatch	·	1.7 km	MPC · JPL
569876	2005 YK_{112}	—	December 2, 2005	Mount Lemmon	Mount Lemmon Survey	·	840 m	MPC · JPL
569877	2005 YO_{119}	—	December 26, 2005	Mount Lemmon	Mount Lemmon Survey	·	2.1 km	MPC · JPL
569878	2005 YG_{121}	—	December 28, 2005	Mount Lemmon	Mount Lemmon Survey	·	1.4 km	MPC · JPL
569879	2005 YJ_{124}	—	December 8, 2005	Kitt Peak	Spacewatch	EUN	1.3 km	MPC · JPL
569880	2005 YR_{125}	—	December 26, 2005	Kitt Peak	Spacewatch	·	1.6 km	MPC · JPL
569881	2005 YK_{126}	—	December 1, 2005	Mount Lemmon	Mount Lemmon Survey	MAR	1.2 km	MPC · JPL
569882	2005 YB_{130}	—	December 24, 2005	Kitt Peak	Spacewatch	·	1.9 km	MPC · JPL
569883	2005 YK_{130}	—	December 24, 2005	Kitt Peak	Spacewatch	HNS	1.1 km	MPC · JPL
569884	2005 YE_{133}	—	November 30, 2005	Kitt Peak	Spacewatch	·	2.6 km	MPC · JPL
569885	2005 YY_{139}	—	December 28, 2005	Kitt Peak	Spacewatch	EUN	1.1 km	MPC · JPL
569886	2005 YN_{140}	—	December 28, 2005	Mount Lemmon	Mount Lemmon Survey	·	1.3 km	MPC · JPL
569887	2005 YP_{140}	—	December 28, 2005	Mount Lemmon	Mount Lemmon Survey	·	1.5 km	MPC · JPL
569888	2005 YV_{140}	—	December 28, 2005	Mount Lemmon	Mount Lemmon Survey	RAF	800 m	MPC · JPL
569889	2005 YS_{143}	—	December 28, 2005	Mount Lemmon	Mount Lemmon Survey	·	1.1 km	MPC · JPL
569890	2005 YH_{145}	—	December 29, 2005	Catalina	CSS	HNS	1.3 km	MPC · JPL
569891	2005 YM_{146}	—	December 1, 2005	Mount Lemmon	Mount Lemmon Survey	·	1.2 km	MPC · JPL
569892	2005 YQ_{147}	—	December 29, 2005	Mount Lemmon	Mount Lemmon Survey	·	1.8 km	MPC · JPL
569893	2005 YU_{147}	—	December 29, 2005	Socorro	LINEAR	(5)	1.0 km	MPC · JPL
569894	2005 YU_{148}	—	December 25, 2005	Kitt Peak	Spacewatch	·	1.4 km	MPC · JPL
569895	2005 YP_{152}	—	December 28, 2005	Kitt Peak	Spacewatch	·	2.6 km	MPC · JPL
569896	2005 YS_{154}	—	November 25, 2005	Mount Lemmon	Mount Lemmon Survey	·	1.6 km	MPC · JPL
569897	2005 YE_{173}	—	December 24, 2005	Socorro	LINEAR	PHO	880 m	MPC · JPL
569898	2005 YC_{189}	—	December 29, 2005	Kitt Peak	Spacewatch	·	840 m	MPC · JPL
569899	2005 YH_{190}	—	December 30, 2005	Kitt Peak	Spacewatch	·	3.5 km	MPC · JPL
569900	2005 YK_{191}	—	December 30, 2005	Kitt Peak	Spacewatch	·	3.0 km	MPC · JPL

== 569901–570000 ==
back to top

Designation			Discovery			Properties		Ref
Permanent	Provisional	Named after	Date	Site	Discoverer(s)	Category	Diam.	Ref
569901	2005 YA_{192}	—	December 6, 2005	Mount Lemmon	Mount Lemmon Survey	·	1.9 km	MPC · JPL
569902	2005 YT_{194}	—	December 31, 2005	Kitt Peak	Spacewatch	·	3.2 km	MPC · JPL
569903	2005 YJ_{202}	—	December 1, 2005	Mount Lemmon	Mount Lemmon Survey	·	1.6 km	MPC · JPL
569904	2005 YY_{205}	—	December 27, 2005	Kitt Peak	Spacewatch	·	1.7 km	MPC · JPL
569905	2005 YN_{218}	—	December 25, 2005	Kitt Peak	Spacewatch	·	3.1 km	MPC · JPL
569906	2005 YC_{220}	—	December 31, 2005	Mount Lemmon	Mount Lemmon Survey	·	1.1 km	MPC · JPL
569907	2005 YF_{222}	—	December 21, 2005	Kitt Peak	Spacewatch	·	3.2 km	MPC · JPL
569908	2005 YV_{226}	—	December 25, 2005	Kitt Peak	Spacewatch	·	960 m	MPC · JPL
569909	2005 YX_{226}	—	February 19, 2002	Kitt Peak	Spacewatch	·	1.7 km	MPC · JPL
569910	2005 YH_{228}	—	September 28, 2001	Palomar	NEAT	·	680 m	MPC · JPL
569911	2005 YZ_{229}	—	December 26, 2005	Kitt Peak	Spacewatch	·	720 m	MPC · JPL
569912	2005 YB_{231}	—	December 27, 2005	Kitt Peak	Spacewatch	·	920 m	MPC · JPL
569913	2005 YH_{233}	—	December 28, 2005	Mount Lemmon	Mount Lemmon Survey	3:2	3.6 km	MPC · JPL
569914	2005 YP_{233}	—	December 28, 2005	Mount Lemmon	Mount Lemmon Survey	·	1.2 km	MPC · JPL
569915	2005 YQ_{237}	—	December 28, 2005	Kitt Peak	Spacewatch	·	1.4 km	MPC · JPL
569916	2005 YQ_{238}	—	December 29, 2005	Kitt Peak	Spacewatch	·	1.4 km	MPC · JPL
569917	2005 YS_{238}	—	December 29, 2005	Kitt Peak	Spacewatch	·	750 m	MPC · JPL
569918	2005 YW_{241}	—	December 4, 2005	Kitt Peak	Spacewatch	·	1.3 km	MPC · JPL
569919	2005 YJ_{242}	—	December 30, 2005	Kitt Peak	Spacewatch	·	1.9 km	MPC · JPL
569920	2005 YJ_{243}	—	December 30, 2005	Kitt Peak	Spacewatch	·	3.0 km	MPC · JPL
569921	2005 YT_{244}	—	December 30, 2005	Kitt Peak	Spacewatch	·	1.5 km	MPC · JPL
569922	2005 YJ_{250}	—	December 28, 2005	Kitt Peak	Spacewatch	·	1.6 km	MPC · JPL
569923	2005 YJ_{251}	—	December 28, 2005	Kitt Peak	Spacewatch	·	1.5 km	MPC · JPL
569924	2005 YY_{254}	—	December 30, 2005	Kitt Peak	Spacewatch	·	3.2 km	MPC · JPL
569925	2005 YJ_{256}	—	December 30, 2005	Kitt Peak	Spacewatch	(5)	1.4 km	MPC · JPL
569926	2005 YA_{259}	—	December 4, 2005	Kitt Peak	Spacewatch	·	1.0 km	MPC · JPL
569927	2005 YC_{259}	—	December 24, 2005	Kitt Peak	Spacewatch	·	2.5 km	MPC · JPL
569928	2005 YR_{259}	—	December 24, 2005	Kitt Peak	Spacewatch	·	1.3 km	MPC · JPL
569929	2005 YA_{261}	—	November 26, 2005	Kitt Peak	Spacewatch	·	2.3 km	MPC · JPL
569930	2005 YS_{273}	—	July 30, 2003	Palomar	NEAT	·	2.5 km	MPC · JPL
569931	2005 YK_{279}	—	December 4, 2005	Mount Lemmon	Mount Lemmon Survey	·	1.9 km	MPC · JPL
569932	2005 YE_{280}	—	December 25, 2005	Kitt Peak	Spacewatch	·	2.5 km	MPC · JPL
569933	2005 YB_{283}	—	December 27, 2005	Kitt Peak	Spacewatch	·	760 m	MPC · JPL
569934	2005 YZ_{293}	—	December 24, 2005	Kitt Peak	Spacewatch	HNS	1.4 km	MPC · JPL
569935	2005 YC_{294}	—	December 18, 2014	Haleakala	Pan-STARRS 1	·	2.1 km	MPC · JPL
569936	2005 YF_{294}	—	December 22, 2005	Kitt Peak	Spacewatch	AGN	940 m	MPC · JPL
569937	2005 YX_{295}	—	December 25, 2005	Anderson Mesa	LONEOS	H	580 m	MPC · JPL
569938	2005 YY_{295}	—	November 10, 2013	Kitt Peak	Spacewatch	(5)	1.1 km	MPC · JPL
569939	2005 YO_{296}	—	March 12, 2011	Mount Lemmon	Mount Lemmon Survey	·	1.2 km	MPC · JPL
569940	2005 YK_{298}	—	November 20, 2009	Mount Lemmon	Mount Lemmon Survey	(5)	1.0 km	MPC · JPL
569941	2005 YO_{298}	—	January 27, 2007	Mount Lemmon	Mount Lemmon Survey	TIR	2.2 km	MPC · JPL
569942	2005 YT_{298}	—	September 25, 2016	Haleakala	Pan-STARRS 1	·	2.4 km	MPC · JPL
569943	2005 YQ_{299}	—	December 30, 2005	Kitt Peak	Spacewatch	·	650 m	MPC · JPL
569944	2005 YE_{300}	—	December 25, 2005	Mount Lemmon	Mount Lemmon Survey	PAD	1.2 km	MPC · JPL
569945	2005 YN_{300}	—	December 31, 2005	Kitt Peak	Spacewatch	·	2.6 km	MPC · JPL
569946	2005 YZ_{300}	—	December 30, 2005	Kitt Peak	Spacewatch	·	1.1 km	MPC · JPL
569947	2006 AG_{1}	—	December 25, 2005	Kitt Peak	Spacewatch	EUN	1.2 km	MPC · JPL
569948	2006 AA_{5}	—	January 2, 2006	Catalina	CSS	H	560 m	MPC · JPL
569949	2006 AC_{16}	—	January 4, 2006	Kitt Peak	Spacewatch	(2076)	860 m	MPC · JPL
569950	2006 AF_{17}	—	December 24, 2005	Kitt Peak	Spacewatch	·	2.5 km	MPC · JPL
569951	2006 AO_{33}	—	January 6, 2006	Kitt Peak	Spacewatch	·	1.6 km	MPC · JPL
569952	2006 AC_{40}	—	January 7, 2006	Mount Lemmon	Mount Lemmon Survey	·	3.0 km	MPC · JPL
569953	2006 AN_{43}	—	February 13, 2002	Apache Point	SDSS Collaboration	·	1.5 km	MPC · JPL
569954	2006 AY_{50}	—	December 28, 2005	Kitt Peak	Spacewatch	MRX	930 m	MPC · JPL
569955	2006 AL_{56}	—	December 28, 2005	Kitt Peak	Spacewatch	·	810 m	MPC · JPL
569956	2006 AJ_{60}	—	January 5, 2006	Kitt Peak	Spacewatch	·	1.5 km	MPC · JPL
569957	2006 AA_{61}	—	January 5, 2006	Kitt Peak	Spacewatch	·	1.7 km	MPC · JPL
569958	2006 AS_{64}	—	August 23, 2004	Kitt Peak	Spacewatch	·	1.6 km	MPC · JPL
569959	2006 AA_{76}	—	January 5, 2006	Kitt Peak	Spacewatch	·	2.7 km	MPC · JPL
569960	2006 AE_{88}	—	January 5, 2006	Kitt Peak	Spacewatch	PHO	910 m	MPC · JPL
569961	2006 AO_{91}	—	January 7, 2006	Kitt Peak	Spacewatch	H	340 m	MPC · JPL
569962	2006 AS_{94}	—	January 8, 2006	Kitt Peak	Spacewatch	·	1.8 km	MPC · JPL
569963	2006 AS_{104}	—	January 7, 2006	Mount Lemmon	Mount Lemmon Survey	·	1.5 km	MPC · JPL
569964	2006 AB_{107}	—	January 7, 2006	Kitt Peak	Spacewatch	·	1.1 km	MPC · JPL
569965	2006 AG_{107}	—	November 24, 2009	Kitt Peak	Spacewatch	·	1.8 km	MPC · JPL
569966	2006 AB_{108}	—	March 14, 2012	Mount Lemmon	Mount Lemmon Survey	·	1.8 km	MPC · JPL
569967	2006 AJ_{108}	—	January 5, 2006	Mount Lemmon	Mount Lemmon Survey	·	780 m	MPC · JPL
569968	2006 AK_{108}	—	January 6, 2006	Mount Lemmon	Mount Lemmon Survey	H	590 m	MPC · JPL
569969	2006 AO_{108}	—	January 9, 2006	Siding Spring	SSS	·	1.0 km	MPC · JPL
569970	2006 AH_{109}	—	January 29, 2015	Haleakala	Pan-STARRS 1	·	1.3 km	MPC · JPL
569971	2006 AU_{109}	—	January 10, 2006	Kitt Peak	Spacewatch	·	590 m	MPC · JPL
569972	2006 AW_{110}	—	January 15, 2015	Haleakala	Pan-STARRS 1	MAR	970 m	MPC · JPL
569973	2006 AY_{111}	—	January 17, 2013	Haleakala	Pan-STARRS 1	(2076)	600 m	MPC · JPL
569974	2006 AO_{112}	—	January 10, 2006	Mount Lemmon	Mount Lemmon Survey	·	2.8 km	MPC · JPL
569975	2006 AC_{114}	—	January 10, 2006	Kitt Peak	Spacewatch	·	1.7 km	MPC · JPL
569976	2006 AY_{115}	—	January 7, 2006	Mount Lemmon	Mount Lemmon Survey	·	1.4 km	MPC · JPL
569977	2006 BL_{15}	—	December 22, 2005	Kitt Peak	Spacewatch	·	670 m	MPC · JPL
569978	2006 BB_{18}	—	January 22, 2006	Mount Lemmon	Mount Lemmon Survey	·	1.5 km	MPC · JPL
569979	2006 BH_{23}	—	January 23, 2006	Kitt Peak	Spacewatch	·	1.4 km	MPC · JPL
569980	2006 BA_{27}	—	January 25, 2006	Piszkéstető	K. Sárneczky	DOR	2.5 km	MPC · JPL
569981	2006 BZ_{39}	—	December 2, 2005	Kitt Peak	Wasserman, L. H., Millis, R. L.	·	2.4 km	MPC · JPL
569982	2006 BJ_{40}	—	December 25, 2005	Kitt Peak	Spacewatch	·	620 m	MPC · JPL
569983	2006 BJ_{41}	—	September 17, 2004	Kitt Peak	Spacewatch	·	1.6 km	MPC · JPL
569984	2006 BK_{49}	—	January 7, 2006	Kitt Peak	Spacewatch	·	1.7 km	MPC · JPL
569985	2006 BZ_{56}	—	January 22, 2006	Mount Lemmon	Mount Lemmon Survey	·	1.2 km	MPC · JPL
569986	2006 BV_{57}	—	January 23, 2006	Kitt Peak	Spacewatch	L5	8.0 km	MPC · JPL
569987	2006 BS_{61}	—	January 20, 2006	Palomar	NEAT	·	3.4 km	MPC · JPL
569988	2006 BO_{68}	—	January 23, 2006	Kitt Peak	Spacewatch	·	580 m	MPC · JPL
569989	2006 BS_{72}	—	January 23, 2006	Kitt Peak	Spacewatch	V	490 m	MPC · JPL
569990	2006 BE_{74}	—	January 23, 2006	Kitt Peak	Spacewatch	·	1.8 km	MPC · JPL
569991	2006 BV_{74}	—	January 23, 2006	Kitt Peak	Spacewatch	·	650 m	MPC · JPL
569992	2006 BK_{83}	—	January 25, 2006	Mount Lemmon	Mount Lemmon Survey	JUN	970 m	MPC · JPL
569993	2006 BV_{84}	—	January 25, 2006	Kitt Peak	Spacewatch	·	1.4 km	MPC · JPL
569994	2006 BH_{85}	—	January 25, 2006	Kitt Peak	Spacewatch	·	660 m	MPC · JPL
569995	2006 BW_{85}	—	January 25, 2006	Kitt Peak	Spacewatch	·	700 m	MPC · JPL
569996	2006 BO_{93}	—	January 26, 2006	Catalina	CSS	H	600 m	MPC · JPL
569997	2006 BQ_{97}	—	November 30, 2005	Mount Lemmon	Mount Lemmon Survey	·	2.0 km	MPC · JPL
569998	2006 BP_{100}	—	January 28, 2006	7300	W. K. Y. Yeung	THB	2.8 km	MPC · JPL
569999	2006 BR_{104}	—	January 25, 2006	Kitt Peak	Spacewatch	·	1.9 km	MPC · JPL
570000	2006 BN_{115}	—	November 7, 2005	Mauna Kea	A. Boattini	·	1.5 km	MPC · JPL

back to top

== Meaning of names ==
As minor planet discoveries are confirmed, they are given a permanent number by the IAU's Minor Planet Center (MPC), and the discoverers can then submit names for them, following the IAU's naming conventions. The list below concerns those minor planets in the specified number-range that have received names, and explains the meanings of those names.

Official naming citations of newly named small Solar System bodies are approved and published in a bulletin by IAU's Working Group for Small Bodies Nomenclature (WGSBN). Before May 2021, citations were published in MPC's Minor Planet Circulars for many decades. Recent citations can also be found on the JPL Small-Body Database (SBDB). Until his death in 2016, German astronomer Lutz D. Schmadel compiled these citations into the Dictionary of Minor Planet Names (DMP) and regularly updated the collection.

Based on Paul Herget's The Names of the Minor Planets, Schmadel also researched the unclear origin of numerous asteroids, most of which had been named prior to World War II. This article incorporates text from this source, which is in the public domain: SBDB New namings may only be added to this list below after official publication as the preannouncement of names is condemned. The WGSBN publishes a comprehensive guideline for the naming rules of non-cometary small Solar System bodies.

Named minor planet	Provisional	This minor planet was named for...	Ref · Catalog
569484 Irisdement	2005 UC_{4}	Iris Luella DeMent (b. 1961) is an American singer and songwriter. DeMent's musical style includes elements of folk, country and gospel. Her voice is made to embody intense emotions. Her most famous song “Let the Mystery Be” has been used in many films and series and has been covered by a number of artists.	IAU · 569484
