= List of minor planets: 643001–644000 =

The following is a partial list of minor planets, running from minor-planet number 643001 through 644000, inclusive. The primary data for this and other partial lists is based on JPL's "Small-Body Orbital Elements" and data available from the Minor Planet Center. Critical list information is also provided by the MPC, unless otherwise specified from Lowell Observatory. A detailed description of the table's columns and additional sources are given on the main page including a complete list of every page in this series, and a statistical break-up on the dynamical classification of minor planets.

Also see the summary list of all named bodies in numerical and alphabetical order, and the corresponding naming citations for the number range of this particular list. New namings may only be added to this list after official publication, as the preannouncement of names is condemned by the Working Group for Small Bodies Nomenclature of the International Astronomical Union.

Near-Earth obj.	MBA (inner)	MBA (outer)	Centaur
Mars-crosser	MBA (middle)	Jupiter trojan	Trans-Neptunian obj.
Unclassified

== 643001–643100 ==
Designation			Discovery			Properties		Ref
Permanent	Provisional	Named after	Date	Site	Discoverer(s)	Category	Diam.	Ref
643001	2005 VW_{149}	—	July 15, 2013	Haleakala	Pan-STARRS 1	·	1.2 km	MPC · JPL
643002	2005 VF_{150}	—	February 26, 2014	Haleakala	Pan-STARRS 1	·	680 m	MPC · JPL
643003	2005 VM_{150}	—	November 1, 2005	Mount Lemmon	Mount Lemmon Survey	·	1.3 km	MPC · JPL
643004	2005 VF_{152}	—	November 12, 2005	Kitt Peak	Spacewatch	·	1.3 km	MPC · JPL
643005	2005 VX_{153}	—	November 1, 2005	Mount Lemmon	Mount Lemmon Survey	·	1.3 km	MPC · JPL
643006	2005 VM_{154}	—	November 7, 2005	Mauna Kea	A. Boattini	·	1.3 km	MPC · JPL
643007	2005 VS_{154}	—	November 4, 2005	Kitt Peak	Spacewatch	VER	2.3 km	MPC · JPL
643008	2005 VH_{156}	—	November 6, 2005	Mount Lemmon	Mount Lemmon Survey	·	1.0 km	MPC · JPL
643009	2005 VQ_{156}	—	November 1, 2005	Kitt Peak	Spacewatch	·	1.0 km	MPC · JPL
643010	2005 WR_{13}	—	November 5, 2005	Kitt Peak	Spacewatch	·	540 m	MPC · JPL
643011	2005 WV_{13}	—	November 22, 2005	Kitt Peak	Spacewatch	NYS	610 m	MPC · JPL
643012	2005 WB_{14}	—	November 22, 2005	Kitt Peak	Spacewatch	·	1.2 km	MPC · JPL
643013	2005 WD_{14}	—	October 25, 2005	Mount Lemmon	Mount Lemmon Survey	·	2.6 km	MPC · JPL
643014	2005 WL_{14}	—	November 22, 2005	Kitt Peak	Spacewatch	·	1.1 km	MPC · JPL
643015	2005 WY_{14}	—	October 1, 2005	Mount Lemmon	Mount Lemmon Survey	·	1.4 km	MPC · JPL
643016	2005 WV_{16}	—	November 22, 2005	Kitt Peak	Spacewatch	·	1.3 km	MPC · JPL
643017	2005 WR_{20}	—	October 14, 2001	Apache Point	SDSS Collaboration	·	860 m	MPC · JPL
643018	2005 WF_{24}	—	October 29, 2005	Kitt Peak	Spacewatch	·	1.3 km	MPC · JPL
643019	2005 WT_{28}	—	September 30, 2005	Mount Lemmon	Mount Lemmon Survey	·	2.2 km	MPC · JPL
643020	2005 WH_{31}	—	November 21, 2005	Kitt Peak	Spacewatch	NYS	730 m	MPC · JPL
643021	2005 WF_{38}	—	November 22, 2005	Kitt Peak	Spacewatch	·	2.7 km	MPC · JPL
643022	2005 WY_{38}	—	November 25, 2005	Kitt Peak	Spacewatch	·	1.7 km	MPC · JPL
643023	2005 WM_{45}	—	November 22, 2005	Kitt Peak	Spacewatch	·	2.1 km	MPC · JPL
643024	2005 WA_{47}	—	November 25, 2005	Kitt Peak	Spacewatch	NYS	810 m	MPC · JPL
643025	2005 WN_{47}	—	November 25, 2005	Kitt Peak	Spacewatch	MAS	470 m	MPC · JPL
643026	2005 WR_{50}	—	November 25, 2005	Mount Lemmon	Mount Lemmon Survey	·	1.1 km	MPC · JPL
643027	2005 WO_{53}	—	November 5, 2005	Kitt Peak	Spacewatch	MAS	460 m	MPC · JPL
643028	2005 WQ_{64}	—	November 25, 2005	Mount Lemmon	Mount Lemmon Survey	·	1.0 km	MPC · JPL
643029	2005 WE_{77}	—	November 25, 2005	Kitt Peak	Spacewatch	V	490 m	MPC · JPL
643030	2005 WK_{93}	—	November 25, 2005	Mount Lemmon	Mount Lemmon Survey	·	1.7 km	MPC · JPL
643031	2005 WX_{93}	—	November 26, 2005	Kitt Peak	Spacewatch	·	780 m	MPC · JPL
643032	2005 WB_{109}	—	October 27, 2005	Mount Lemmon	Mount Lemmon Survey	·	1.7 km	MPC · JPL
643033	2005 WJ_{111}	—	November 30, 2005	Kitt Peak	Spacewatch	·	1.2 km	MPC · JPL
643034	2005 WG_{115}	—	November 29, 2005	Mount Lemmon	Mount Lemmon Survey	EOS	1.6 km	MPC · JPL
643035	2005 WL_{121}	—	November 5, 2005	Kitt Peak	Spacewatch	·	3.0 km	MPC · JPL
643036	2005 WD_{125}	—	October 25, 2005	Kitt Peak	Spacewatch	·	1.3 km	MPC · JPL
643037	2005 WD_{126}	—	November 25, 2005	Mount Lemmon	Mount Lemmon Survey	·	2.8 km	MPC · JPL
643038	2005 WJ_{128}	—	November 25, 2005	Mount Lemmon	Mount Lemmon Survey	THM	1.6 km	MPC · JPL
643039	2005 WQ_{128}	—	November 25, 2005	Mount Lemmon	Mount Lemmon Survey	·	1.3 km	MPC · JPL
643040	2005 WM_{132}	—	November 25, 2005	Mount Lemmon	Mount Lemmon Survey	·	2.3 km	MPC · JPL
643041	2005 WA_{133}	—	October 27, 2005	Mount Lemmon	Mount Lemmon Survey	V	480 m	MPC · JPL
643042	2005 WN_{133}	—	November 25, 2005	Mount Lemmon	Mount Lemmon Survey	MAS	480 m	MPC · JPL
643043	2005 WU_{136}	—	November 26, 2005	Mount Lemmon	Mount Lemmon Survey	·	1.6 km	MPC · JPL
643044	2005 WV_{138}	—	November 26, 2005	Mount Lemmon	Mount Lemmon Survey	·	1.3 km	MPC · JPL
643045	2005 WT_{147}	—	November 25, 2005	Kitt Peak	Spacewatch	H	510 m	MPC · JPL
643046	2005 WP_{149}	—	July 20, 2001	Palomar	NEAT	·	880 m	MPC · JPL
643047	2005 WQ_{161}	—	November 5, 2005	Kitt Peak	Spacewatch	·	1.3 km	MPC · JPL
643048	2005 WC_{164}	—	November 29, 2005	Kitt Peak	Spacewatch	·	1.1 km	MPC · JPL
643049	2005 WE_{164}	—	November 29, 2005	Kitt Peak	Spacewatch	·	1.5 km	MPC · JPL
643050	2005 WX_{173}	—	November 30, 2005	Mount Lemmon	Mount Lemmon Survey	·	1.8 km	MPC · JPL
643051	2005 WU_{183}	—	November 28, 2005	Palomar	NEAT	·	3.1 km	MPC · JPL
643052	2005 WH_{187}	—	November 29, 2005	Kitt Peak	Spacewatch	·	1.3 km	MPC · JPL
643053	2005 WZ_{202}	—	November 30, 2005	Kitt Peak	Spacewatch	(12739)	1.3 km	MPC · JPL
643054	2005 WV_{204}	—	November 25, 2005	Mount Lemmon	Mount Lemmon Survey	·	2.7 km	MPC · JPL
643055	2005 WQ_{205}	—	November 30, 2005	Mount Lemmon	Mount Lemmon Survey	·	1.5 km	MPC · JPL
643056	2005 WX_{205}	—	November 5, 2005	Kitt Peak	Spacewatch	·	2.5 km	MPC · JPL
643057	2005 WH_{209}	—	November 25, 2005	Mauna Kea	P. A. Wiegert, D. D. Balam	·	2.2 km	MPC · JPL
643058	2005 WW_{211}	—	November 10, 2005	Kitt Peak	Spacewatch	MAS	620 m	MPC · JPL
643059	2005 WT_{212}	—	November 30, 2005	Kitt Peak	Spacewatch	·	1.9 km	MPC · JPL
643060	2005 WV_{212}	—	November 25, 2005	Kitt Peak	Spacewatch	·	1.5 km	MPC · JPL
643061	2005 WB_{213}	—	November 30, 2005	Mount Lemmon	Mount Lemmon Survey	·	3.1 km	MPC · JPL
643062	2005 WE_{213}	—	January 2, 2012	Mount Lemmon	Mount Lemmon Survey	·	2.6 km	MPC · JPL
643063	2005 WO_{213}	—	September 23, 2015	Haleakala	Pan-STARRS 1	·	580 m	MPC · JPL
643064	2005 WY_{213}	—	October 21, 2012	Haleakala	Pan-STARRS 1	·	670 m	MPC · JPL
643065	2005 WE_{214}	—	October 15, 2012	Kitt Peak	Spacewatch	·	820 m	MPC · JPL
643066	2005 WV_{214}	—	September 29, 2009	Mount Lemmon	Mount Lemmon Survey	·	1.6 km	MPC · JPL
643067	2005 WF_{215}	—	November 22, 2005	Kitt Peak	Spacewatch	WIT	750 m	MPC · JPL
643068	2005 WO_{215}	—	July 19, 2015	Haleakala	Pan-STARRS 1	·	2.7 km	MPC · JPL
643069	2005 WD_{216}	—	November 25, 2005	Kitt Peak	Spacewatch	MAR	960 m	MPC · JPL
643070	2005 WB_{217}	—	November 21, 2005	Kitt Peak	Spacewatch	·	2.8 km	MPC · JPL
643071	2005 WJ_{217}	—	November 25, 2005	Kitt Peak	Spacewatch	·	1.3 km	MPC · JPL
643072	2005 WM_{217}	—	November 25, 2005	Kitt Peak	Spacewatch	·	1.6 km	MPC · JPL
643073	2005 WM_{219}	—	November 25, 2005	Kitt Peak	Spacewatch	·	2.9 km	MPC · JPL
643074	2005 WM_{220}	—	November 25, 2005	Kitt Peak	Spacewatch	·	2.3 km	MPC · JPL
643075	2005 XQ_{5}	—	October 23, 2005	Palomar	NEAT	·	1.4 km	MPC · JPL
643076	2005 XM_{12}	—	December 1, 2005	Mount Lemmon	Mount Lemmon Survey	·	710 m	MPC · JPL
643077	2005 XP_{14}	—	December 1, 2005	Kitt Peak	Spacewatch	·	820 m	MPC · JPL
643078	2005 XA_{21}	—	October 24, 2005	Kitt Peak	Spacewatch	·	1.5 km	MPC · JPL
643079	2005 XF_{23}	—	December 2, 2005	Mount Lemmon	Mount Lemmon Survey	·	1.4 km	MPC · JPL
643080	2005 XM_{23}	—	December 2, 2005	Mount Lemmon	Mount Lemmon Survey	·	700 m	MPC · JPL
643081	2005 XD_{26}	—	December 4, 2005	Mount Lemmon	Mount Lemmon Survey	·	1.3 km	MPC · JPL
643082	2005 XM_{30}	—	December 1, 2005	Kitt Peak	Spacewatch	·	1.4 km	MPC · JPL
643083	2005 XC_{34}	—	December 4, 2005	Kitt Peak	Spacewatch	·	770 m	MPC · JPL
643084	2005 XF_{35}	—	December 4, 2005	Kitt Peak	Spacewatch	·	770 m	MPC · JPL
643085	2005 XP_{35}	—	December 4, 2005	Kitt Peak	Spacewatch	NYS	600 m	MPC · JPL
643086	2005 XT_{35}	—	December 4, 2005	Kitt Peak	Spacewatch	·	1.0 km	MPC · JPL
643087	2005 XW_{39}	—	December 5, 2005	Kitt Peak	Spacewatch	·	730 m	MPC · JPL
643088	2005 XS_{41}	—	December 7, 2005	Kitt Peak	Spacewatch	EUN	1.1 km	MPC · JPL
643089	2005 XD_{44}	—	December 2, 2005	Kitt Peak	Spacewatch	·	1.8 km	MPC · JPL
643090	2005 XV_{47}	—	December 2, 2005	Kitt Peak	Spacewatch	·	2.2 km	MPC · JPL
643091	2005 XZ_{51}	—	December 2, 2005	Kitt Peak	Spacewatch	·	1.7 km	MPC · JPL
643092	2005 XV_{55}	—	November 26, 2005	Mount Lemmon	Mount Lemmon Survey	·	810 m	MPC · JPL
643093	2005 XL_{58}	—	December 2, 2005	Mount Lemmon	Mount Lemmon Survey	·	1.5 km	MPC · JPL
643094	2005 XP_{59}	—	November 25, 2005	Kitt Peak	Spacewatch	·	690 m	MPC · JPL
643095	2005 XT_{59}	—	December 3, 2005	Kitt Peak	Spacewatch	·	1.5 km	MPC · JPL
643096	2005 XO_{60}	—	December 4, 2005	Kitt Peak	Spacewatch	·	2.7 km	MPC · JPL
643097	2005 XP_{67}	—	December 5, 2005	Mount Lemmon	Mount Lemmon Survey	·	710 m	MPC · JPL
643098	2005 XK_{71}	—	December 6, 2005	Kitt Peak	Spacewatch	·	1.6 km	MPC · JPL
643099	2005 XD_{74}	—	December 6, 2005	Kitt Peak	Spacewatch	·	1.8 km	MPC · JPL
643100	2005 XK_{77}	—	December 8, 2005	Kitt Peak	Spacewatch	·	2.1 km	MPC · JPL

== 643101–643200 ==
back to top

Designation			Discovery			Properties		Ref
Permanent	Provisional	Named after	Date	Site	Discoverer(s)	Category	Diam.	Ref
643101	2005 XR_{88}	—	December 6, 2005	Kitt Peak	Spacewatch	·	1.5 km	MPC · JPL
643102	2005 XN_{89}	—	December 7, 2005	Kitt Peak	Spacewatch	·	1.6 km	MPC · JPL
643103	2005 XK_{92}	—	December 8, 2005	Catalina	CSS	·	1.8 km	MPC · JPL
643104	2005 XE_{96}	—	October 28, 2005	Mount Lemmon	Mount Lemmon Survey	3:2	4.6 km	MPC · JPL
643105	2005 XR_{102}	—	December 1, 2005	Kitt Peak	L. H. Wasserman, R. L. Millis	MAS	820 m	MPC · JPL
643106	2005 XM_{106}	—	December 1, 2005	Kitt Peak	Wasserman, L. H., Millis, R. L.	·	1.6 km	MPC · JPL
643107	2005 XP_{110}	—	December 3, 2005	Mauna Kea	A. Boattini	·	920 m	MPC · JPL
643108	2005 XW_{111}	—	December 4, 2005	Mount Lemmon	Mount Lemmon Survey	AGN	1.1 km	MPC · JPL
643109	2005 XF_{118}	—	November 8, 2018	Mount Lemmon	Mount Lemmon Survey	·	1.3 km	MPC · JPL
643110	2005 XL_{120}	—	February 11, 2008	Mount Lemmon	Mount Lemmon Survey	·	2.8 km	MPC · JPL
643111	2005 XN_{120}	—	December 8, 2005	Kitt Peak	Spacewatch	·	3.1 km	MPC · JPL
643112	2005 XW_{120}	—	November 26, 2006	Kitt Peak	Spacewatch	·	850 m	MPC · JPL
643113	2005 XQ_{121}	—	December 10, 2005	Kitt Peak	Spacewatch	·	800 m	MPC · JPL
643114	2005 XR_{121}	—	October 27, 2008	Mount Lemmon	Mount Lemmon Survey	·	770 m	MPC · JPL
643115	2005 XS_{121}	—	July 27, 2011	Haleakala	Pan-STARRS 1	·	710 m	MPC · JPL
643116	2005 XK_{122}	—	December 2, 2005	Kitt Peak	Spacewatch	·	1.6 km	MPC · JPL
643117	2005 XF_{123}	—	December 8, 2005	Kitt Peak	Spacewatch	·	910 m	MPC · JPL
643118	2005 XG_{123}	—	November 26, 2012	Mount Lemmon	Mount Lemmon Survey	·	850 m	MPC · JPL
643119	2005 XZ_{123}	—	December 4, 2012	Mount Lemmon	Mount Lemmon Survey	·	740 m	MPC · JPL
643120	2005 XC_{124}	—	October 23, 2012	Kitt Peak	Spacewatch	·	910 m	MPC · JPL
643121	2005 XR_{124}	—	December 1, 2005	Kitt Peak	Spacewatch	·	790 m	MPC · JPL
643122	2005 XF_{125}	—	December 19, 2009	Kitt Peak	Spacewatch	·	610 m	MPC · JPL
643123	2005 XM_{125}	—	December 2, 2005	Kitt Peak	Spacewatch	·	980 m	MPC · JPL
643124	2005 XQ_{125}	—	December 6, 2005	Kitt Peak	Spacewatch	·	2.6 km	MPC · JPL
643125	2005 XS_{126}	—	December 6, 2005	Kitt Peak	Spacewatch	V	580 m	MPC · JPL
643126	2005 XQ_{127}	—	October 22, 2014	Mount Lemmon	Mount Lemmon Survey	·	1.4 km	MPC · JPL
643127	2005 XY_{127}	—	December 2, 2005	Kitt Peak	Spacewatch	EUN	1 km	MPC · JPL
643128	2005 XD_{128}	—	January 8, 2016	Haleakala	Pan-STARRS 1	·	1.9 km	MPC · JPL
643129	2005 XQ_{128}	—	December 1, 2005	Mount Lemmon	Mount Lemmon Survey	·	2.6 km	MPC · JPL
643130	2005 XV_{128}	—	September 12, 2015	Haleakala	Pan-STARRS 1	H	390 m	MPC · JPL
643131	2005 XH_{129}	—	December 27, 2017	Mount Lemmon	Mount Lemmon Survey	·	2.6 km	MPC · JPL
643132	2005 XD_{130}	—	December 6, 2005	Kitt Peak	Spacewatch	NYS	680 m	MPC · JPL
643133	2005 XL_{130}	—	October 6, 2012	Kitt Peak	Spacewatch	·	890 m	MPC · JPL
643134	2005 XE_{131}	—	September 9, 2015	Haleakala	Pan-STARRS 1	V	500 m	MPC · JPL
643135	2005 XF_{131}	—	January 11, 2016	Haleakala	Pan-STARRS 1	3:2	4.9 km	MPC · JPL
643136	2005 XP_{131}	—	February 15, 2013	Haleakala	Pan-STARRS 1	·	1.7 km	MPC · JPL
643137	2005 XS_{131}	—	April 5, 2014	Haleakala	Pan-STARRS 1	V	570 m	MPC · JPL
643138	2005 XL_{132}	—	December 1, 2005	Mount Lemmon	Mount Lemmon Survey	HYG	2.6 km	MPC · JPL
643139	2005 XG_{133}	—	December 3, 2005	Kitt Peak	Spacewatch	·	1.4 km	MPC · JPL
643140	2005 XV_{134}	—	December 4, 2005	Kitt Peak	Spacewatch	·	540 m	MPC · JPL
643141	2005 XG_{135}	—	December 7, 2005	Kitt Peak	Spacewatch	·	2.8 km	MPC · JPL
643142	2005 XN_{136}	—	December 4, 2005	Kitt Peak	Spacewatch	·	950 m	MPC · JPL
643143	2005 YS_{5}	—	November 26, 2005	Kitt Peak	Spacewatch	·	1.2 km	MPC · JPL
643144	2005 YM_{9}	—	November 4, 2005	Mount Lemmon	Mount Lemmon Survey	HNS	920 m	MPC · JPL
643145	2005 YE_{10}	—	December 21, 2005	Kitt Peak	Spacewatch	THM	1.9 km	MPC · JPL
643146	2005 YH_{11}	—	December 21, 2005	Kitt Peak	Spacewatch	·	2.7 km	MPC · JPL
643147	2005 YX_{19}	—	December 4, 2005	Kitt Peak	Spacewatch	·	1.7 km	MPC · JPL
643148	2005 YT_{21}	—	December 24, 2005	Kitt Peak	Spacewatch	·	1.4 km	MPC · JPL
643149	2005 YA_{23}	—	December 24, 2005	Kitt Peak	Spacewatch	·	1.8 km	MPC · JPL
643150	2005 YX_{29}	—	December 25, 2005	Kitt Peak	Spacewatch	·	1.5 km	MPC · JPL
643151	2005 YX_{43}	—	December 25, 2005	Kitt Peak	Spacewatch	·	1.7 km	MPC · JPL
643152	2005 YG_{44}	—	December 25, 2005	Kitt Peak	Spacewatch	·	1.8 km	MPC · JPL
643153	2005 YG_{53}	—	December 22, 2005	Kitt Peak	Spacewatch	·	460 m	MPC · JPL
643154	2005 YB_{55}	—	November 25, 2005	Kitt Peak	Spacewatch	·	3.4 km	MPC · JPL
643155	2005 YP_{57}	—	December 24, 2005	Kitt Peak	Spacewatch	·	890 m	MPC · JPL
643156	2005 YP_{58}	—	December 24, 2005	Kitt Peak	Spacewatch	·	2.4 km	MPC · JPL
643157	2005 YY_{60}	—	November 5, 2005	Kitt Peak	Spacewatch	·	770 m	MPC · JPL
643158	2005 YT_{61}	—	December 5, 2005	Mount Lemmon	Mount Lemmon Survey	·	1.5 km	MPC · JPL
643159	2005 YH_{67}	—	December 26, 2005	Kitt Peak	Spacewatch	·	1.9 km	MPC · JPL
643160	2005 YY_{67}	—	December 26, 2005	Kitt Peak	Spacewatch	·	1.6 km	MPC · JPL
643161	2005 YH_{74}	—	December 4, 2005	Kitt Peak	Spacewatch	·	770 m	MPC · JPL
643162	2005 YB_{82}	—	December 24, 2005	Kitt Peak	Spacewatch	MAS	490 m	MPC · JPL
643163	2005 YV_{84}	—	December 25, 2005	Kitt Peak	Spacewatch	AEO	870 m	MPC · JPL
643164	2005 YX_{86}	—	December 25, 2005	Mount Lemmon	Mount Lemmon Survey	·	1.5 km	MPC · JPL
643165	2005 YZ_{86}	—	December 25, 2005	Mount Lemmon	Mount Lemmon Survey	·	1.4 km	MPC · JPL
643166	2005 YK_{87}	—	December 25, 2005	Mount Lemmon	Mount Lemmon Survey	·	640 m	MPC · JPL
643167	2005 YT_{88}	—	December 25, 2005	Mount Lemmon	Mount Lemmon Survey	·	1.6 km	MPC · JPL
643168	2005 YV_{92}	—	December 27, 2005	Mount Lemmon	Mount Lemmon Survey	·	900 m	MPC · JPL
643169	2005 YL_{94}	—	December 21, 2005	Kitt Peak	Spacewatch	V	520 m	MPC · JPL
643170	2005 YD_{95}	—	December 25, 2005	Kitt Peak	Spacewatch	NYS	830 m	MPC · JPL
643171	2005 YH_{96}	—	December 25, 2005	Kitt Peak	Spacewatch	NYS	790 m	MPC · JPL
643172	2005 YV_{98}	—	December 5, 2005	Mount Lemmon	Mount Lemmon Survey	·	900 m	MPC · JPL
643173	2005 YU_{99}	—	December 28, 2005	Kitt Peak	Spacewatch	DOR	1.9 km	MPC · JPL
643174	2005 YE_{103}	—	December 5, 2005	Kitt Peak	Spacewatch	·	1.4 km	MPC · JPL
643175	2005 YR_{105}	—	December 25, 2005	Kitt Peak	Spacewatch	PHO	970 m	MPC · JPL
643176	2005 YN_{107}	—	December 25, 2005	Mount Lemmon	Mount Lemmon Survey	·	740 m	MPC · JPL
643177	2005 YP_{110}	—	December 25, 2005	Kitt Peak	Spacewatch	·	1.1 km	MPC · JPL
643178	2005 YJ_{111}	—	December 25, 2005	Kitt Peak	Spacewatch	·	990 m	MPC · JPL
643179	2005 YA_{112}	—	December 25, 2005	Mount Lemmon	Mount Lemmon Survey	·	890 m	MPC · JPL
643180	2005 YU_{112}	—	December 2, 2005	Mount Lemmon	Mount Lemmon Survey	·	670 m	MPC · JPL
643181	2005 YR_{114}	—	December 25, 2005	Kitt Peak	Spacewatch	(5)	1.2 km	MPC · JPL
643182	2005 YK_{115}	—	December 25, 2005	Kitt Peak	Spacewatch	·	1.6 km	MPC · JPL
643183	2005 YG_{118}	—	December 25, 2005	Kitt Peak	Spacewatch	·	1.7 km	MPC · JPL
643184	2005 YX_{124}	—	December 26, 2005	Kitt Peak	Spacewatch	HNS	1.2 km	MPC · JPL
643185	2005 YX_{134}	—	December 26, 2005	Kitt Peak	Spacewatch	·	1.2 km	MPC · JPL
643186	2005 YC_{143}	—	December 28, 2005	Mount Lemmon	Mount Lemmon Survey	·	2.0 km	MPC · JPL
643187	2005 YY_{143}	—	December 6, 2005	Mount Lemmon	Mount Lemmon Survey	·	1.6 km	MPC · JPL
643188	2005 YJ_{145}	—	December 29, 2005	Mount Lemmon	Mount Lemmon Survey	·	1.5 km	MPC · JPL
643189	2005 YP_{151}	—	December 25, 2005	Kitt Peak	Spacewatch	ERI	930 m	MPC · JPL
643190	2005 YY_{157}	—	December 27, 2005	Kitt Peak	Spacewatch	·	890 m	MPC · JPL
643191	2005 YA_{159}	—	December 27, 2005	Kitt Peak	Spacewatch	·	1.3 km	MPC · JPL
643192	2005 YG_{161}	—	December 27, 2005	Kitt Peak	Spacewatch	ELF	3.4 km	MPC · JPL
643193	2005 YL_{162}	—	December 27, 2005	Mount Lemmon	Mount Lemmon Survey	EUN	1.3 km	MPC · JPL
643194	2005 YB_{163}	—	December 27, 2005	Mount Lemmon	Mount Lemmon Survey	·	1.4 km	MPC · JPL
643195	2005 YT_{186}	—	January 30, 2011	Mount Lemmon	Mount Lemmon Survey	·	1.4 km	MPC · JPL
643196	2005 YO_{194}	—	December 31, 2005	Kitt Peak	Spacewatch	·	1.8 km	MPC · JPL
643197	2005 YG_{195}	—	December 31, 2005	Kitt Peak	Spacewatch	·	1.6 km	MPC · JPL
643198	2005 YA_{198}	—	December 25, 2005	Mount Lemmon	Mount Lemmon Survey	·	820 m	MPC · JPL
643199	2005 YD_{198}	—	December 2, 2005	Mount Lemmon	Mount Lemmon Survey	V	520 m	MPC · JPL
643200	2005 YN_{202}	—	December 25, 2005	Kitt Peak	Spacewatch	MAS	510 m	MPC · JPL

== 643201–643300 ==
back to top

Designation			Discovery			Properties		Ref
Permanent	Provisional	Named after	Date	Site	Discoverer(s)	Category	Diam.	Ref
643201	2005 YX_{204}	—	December 26, 2005	Kitt Peak	Spacewatch	GEF	1.2 km	MPC · JPL
643202	2005 YO_{206}	—	December 27, 2005	Mount Lemmon	Mount Lemmon Survey	·	750 m	MPC · JPL
643203	2005 YV_{215}	—	December 29, 2005	Mount Lemmon	Mount Lemmon Survey	·	1.4 km	MPC · JPL
643204	2005 YX_{218}	—	December 30, 2005	Mount Lemmon	Mount Lemmon Survey	·	760 m	MPC · JPL
643205	2005 YC_{229}	—	December 25, 2005	Kitt Peak	Spacewatch	·	720 m	MPC · JPL
643206	2005 YL_{231}	—	December 27, 2005	Kitt Peak	Spacewatch	·	1.2 km	MPC · JPL
643207	2005 YQ_{233}	—	December 28, 2005	Mount Lemmon	Mount Lemmon Survey	·	1.5 km	MPC · JPL
643208	2005 YU_{233}	—	December 28, 2005	Mount Lemmon	Mount Lemmon Survey	HOF	1.9 km	MPC · JPL
643209	2005 YR_{235}	—	December 28, 2005	Kitt Peak	Spacewatch	PHO	870 m	MPC · JPL
643210	2005 YU_{237}	—	December 28, 2005	Kitt Peak	Spacewatch	·	1.3 km	MPC · JPL
643211	2005 YK_{240}	—	December 29, 2005	Mount Lemmon	Mount Lemmon Survey	·	1.6 km	MPC · JPL
643212	2005 YY_{242}	—	December 30, 2005	Kitt Peak	Spacewatch	·	1.4 km	MPC · JPL
643213	2005 YT_{243}	—	December 30, 2005	Kitt Peak	Spacewatch	·	1.6 km	MPC · JPL
643214	2005 YW_{244}	—	December 30, 2005	Kitt Peak	Spacewatch	·	1.1 km	MPC · JPL
643215	2005 YC_{250}	—	December 28, 2005	Kitt Peak	Spacewatch	AGN	840 m	MPC · JPL
643216	2005 YO_{253}	—	December 29, 2005	Kitt Peak	Spacewatch	HOF	2.1 km	MPC · JPL
643217	2005 YF_{255}	—	December 30, 2005	Kitt Peak	Spacewatch	·	3.2 km	MPC · JPL
643218	2005 YC_{256}	—	December 30, 2005	Kitt Peak	Spacewatch	·	1.9 km	MPC · JPL
643219	2005 YK_{257}	—	December 30, 2005	Kitt Peak	Spacewatch	·	1.2 km	MPC · JPL
643220	2005 YR_{257}	—	November 10, 2005	Kitt Peak	Spacewatch	PAD	1.3 km	MPC · JPL
643221	2005 YS_{258}	—	December 24, 2005	Kitt Peak	Spacewatch	·	2.0 km	MPC · JPL
643222	2005 YZ_{258}	—	March 20, 2002	Kitt Peak	Deep Ecliptic Survey	·	1.2 km	MPC · JPL
643223	2005 YT_{259}	—	December 24, 2005	Kitt Peak	Spacewatch	VER	2.4 km	MPC · JPL
643224	2005 YJ_{262}	—	November 11, 2001	Apache Point	SDSS Collaboration	·	710 m	MPC · JPL
643225	2005 YQ_{262}	—	December 25, 2005	Kitt Peak	Spacewatch	PAD	1.3 km	MPC · JPL
643226	2005 YJ_{267}	—	December 24, 2005	Kitt Peak	Spacewatch	CLA	1.3 km	MPC · JPL
643227	2005 YE_{268}	—	December 25, 2005	Mount Lemmon	Mount Lemmon Survey	·	920 m	MPC · JPL
643228	2005 YZ_{269}	—	December 26, 2005	Mount Lemmon	Mount Lemmon Survey	·	1.0 km	MPC · JPL
643229	2005 YZ_{270}	—	December 28, 2005	Kitt Peak	Spacewatch	·	1.9 km	MPC · JPL
643230	2005 YQ_{275}	—	November 28, 2005	Kitt Peak	Spacewatch	·	1.2 km	MPC · JPL
643231	2005 YY_{275}	—	December 21, 2005	Kitt Peak	Spacewatch	·	1.9 km	MPC · JPL
643232	2005 YS_{276}	—	December 24, 2005	Kitt Peak	Spacewatch	·	850 m	MPC · JPL
643233	2005 YT_{277}	—	November 30, 2005	Mount Lemmon	Mount Lemmon Survey	V	610 m	MPC · JPL
643234	2005 YZ_{283}	—	December 10, 2005	Kitt Peak	Spacewatch	·	760 m	MPC · JPL
643235	2005 YQ_{285}	—	February 20, 2002	Kitt Peak	Spacewatch	·	1.6 km	MPC · JPL
643236	2005 YJ_{288}	—	February 16, 2010	Mount Lemmon	Mount Lemmon Survey	MAS	550 m	MPC · JPL
643237	2005 YS_{288}	—	December 29, 2005	Mount Lemmon	Mount Lemmon Survey	·	1.8 km	MPC · JPL
643238	2005 YC_{291}	—	December 28, 2005	Mount Lemmon	Mount Lemmon Survey	·	1.4 km	MPC · JPL
643239	2005 YP_{293}	—	August 12, 2004	Palomar	NEAT	·	2.9 km	MPC · JPL
643240	2005 YA_{294}	—	November 16, 2009	Mount Lemmon	Mount Lemmon Survey	·	1.1 km	MPC · JPL
643241	2005 YW_{294}	—	February 18, 2010	Mount Lemmon	Mount Lemmon Survey	·	700 m	MPC · JPL
643242	2005 YD_{296}	—	September 4, 2008	Kitt Peak	Spacewatch	·	810 m	MPC · JPL
643243	2005 YK_{296}	—	December 13, 2012	Mount Lemmon	Mount Lemmon Survey	·	950 m	MPC · JPL
643244	2005 YS_{296}	—	May 3, 2008	Mount Lemmon	Mount Lemmon Survey	·	2.9 km	MPC · JPL
643245	2005 YF_{297}	—	August 10, 2015	Haleakala	Pan-STARRS 1	·	800 m	MPC · JPL
643246	2005 YT_{297}	—	November 6, 2012	Kitt Peak	Spacewatch	·	880 m	MPC · JPL
643247	2005 YU_{297}	—	December 29, 2005	Mount Lemmon	Mount Lemmon Survey	·	1.1 km	MPC · JPL
643248	2005 YV_{297}	—	October 19, 2012	Haleakala	Pan-STARRS 1	·	950 m	MPC · JPL
643249	2005 YD_{298}	—	September 3, 1995	Kitt Peak	Spacewatch	·	1.5 km	MPC · JPL
643250	2005 YJ_{298}	—	December 27, 2005	Kitt Peak	Spacewatch	·	2.3 km	MPC · JPL
643251	2005 YY_{299}	—	November 5, 2016	Mount Lemmon	Mount Lemmon Survey	T_{j} (2.96)	4.1 km	MPC · JPL
643252	2005 YF_{300}	—	December 25, 2005	Mount Lemmon	Mount Lemmon Survey	NYS	1.0 km	MPC · JPL
643253	2005 YM_{300}	—	December 28, 2005	Kitt Peak	Spacewatch	·	1.5 km	MPC · JPL
643254	2005 YP_{300}	—	December 26, 2005	Kitt Peak	Spacewatch	GEF	790 m	MPC · JPL
643255	2005 YS_{300}	—	December 28, 2005	Mount Lemmon	Mount Lemmon Survey	·	1.7 km	MPC · JPL
643256	2005 YE_{301}	—	December 25, 2005	Kitt Peak	Spacewatch	·	1.2 km	MPC · JPL
643257	2005 YR_{301}	—	December 25, 2005	Kitt Peak	Spacewatch	·	1.4 km	MPC · JPL
643258	2005 YH_{302}	—	December 27, 2005	Kitt Peak	Spacewatch	·	2.8 km	MPC · JPL
643259	2006 AA_{2}	—	January 2, 2006	Mount Lemmon	Mount Lemmon Survey	V	590 m	MPC · JPL
643260	2006 AN_{2}	—	January 3, 2006	Socorro	LINEAR	PHO	870 m	MPC · JPL
643261	2006 AR_{6}	—	October 1, 2005	Mount Lemmon	Mount Lemmon Survey	·	2.1 km	MPC · JPL
643262	2006 AD_{9}	—	January 2, 2006	Socorro	LINEAR	PHO	1.0 km	MPC · JPL
643263	2006 AO_{16}	—	January 4, 2006	Catalina	CSS	PHO	980 m	MPC · JPL
643264	2006 AA_{19}	—	January 5, 2006	Kitt Peak	Spacewatch	·	2.2 km	MPC · JPL
643265	2006 AB_{27}	—	January 5, 2006	Kitt Peak	Spacewatch	·	720 m	MPC · JPL
643266	2006 AC_{33}	—	December 30, 2005	Kitt Peak	Spacewatch	·	1.4 km	MPC · JPL
643267	2006 AO_{36}	—	January 4, 2006	Kitt Peak	Spacewatch	HYG	2.5 km	MPC · JPL
643268	2006 AA_{38}	—	January 5, 2006	Mount Lemmon	Mount Lemmon Survey	·	660 m	MPC · JPL
643269	2006 AB_{47}	—	December 29, 2005	Kitt Peak	Spacewatch	·	1.7 km	MPC · JPL
643270	2006 AV_{49}	—	December 8, 2005	Kitt Peak	Spacewatch	·	1.0 km	MPC · JPL
643271	2006 AJ_{51}	—	December 28, 2005	Kitt Peak	Spacewatch	·	690 m	MPC · JPL
643272	2006 AF_{55}	—	January 5, 2006	Kitt Peak	Spacewatch	·	1.3 km	MPC · JPL
643273	2006 AF_{59}	—	December 26, 2005	Mount Lemmon	Mount Lemmon Survey	·	1.7 km	MPC · JPL
643274	2006 AX_{61}	—	January 5, 2006	Kitt Peak	Spacewatch	AGN	1.0 km	MPC · JPL
643275	2006 AR_{62}	—	January 6, 2006	Kitt Peak	Spacewatch	AGN	880 m	MPC · JPL
643276	2006 AQ_{65}	—	December 27, 2005	Kitt Peak	Spacewatch	·	1.8 km	MPC · JPL
643277	2006 AV_{67}	—	December 30, 2005	Mount Lemmon	Mount Lemmon Survey	·	710 m	MPC · JPL
643278	2006 AF_{77}	—	January 6, 2006	Kitt Peak	Spacewatch	·	2.5 km	MPC · JPL
643279	2006 AG_{87}	—	January 2, 2006	Mount Lemmon	Mount Lemmon Survey	·	890 m	MPC · JPL
643280	2006 AR_{87}	—	January 4, 2006	Kitt Peak	Spacewatch	AGN	950 m	MPC · JPL
643281	2006 AR_{88}	—	January 5, 2006	Kitt Peak	Spacewatch	·	840 m	MPC · JPL
643282	2006 AC_{89}	—	January 5, 2006	Mount Lemmon	Mount Lemmon Survey	·	1.5 km	MPC · JPL
643283	2006 AP_{89}	—	January 5, 2006	Kitt Peak	Spacewatch	V	480 m	MPC · JPL
643284	2006 AT_{90}	—	January 6, 2006	Kitt Peak	Spacewatch	·	1.2 km	MPC · JPL
643285	2006 AL_{94}	—	January 8, 2006	Kitt Peak	Spacewatch	·	3.3 km	MPC · JPL
643286	2006 AK_{105}	—	January 6, 2006	Kitt Peak	Spacewatch	·	850 m	MPC · JPL
643287	2006 AN_{108}	—	January 8, 2006	Mount Lemmon	Mount Lemmon Survey	·	1.1 km	MPC · JPL
643288	2006 AZ_{108}	—	January 7, 2006	Kitt Peak	Spacewatch	·	1.4 km	MPC · JPL
643289	2006 AP_{109}	—	January 16, 2013	Haleakala	Pan-STARRS 1	·	880 m	MPC · JPL
643290	2006 AH_{110}	—	August 15, 2013	Haleakala	Pan-STARRS 1	·	1.5 km	MPC · JPL
643291	2006 AJ_{110}	—	September 5, 2008	Kitt Peak	Spacewatch	·	1.0 km	MPC · JPL
643292	2006 AB_{111}	—	May 8, 2014	Haleakala	Pan-STARRS 1	·	780 m	MPC · JPL
643293	2006 AC_{111}	—	January 9, 2006	Kitt Peak	Spacewatch	·	740 m	MPC · JPL
643294	2006 AP_{111}	—	February 8, 2011	Mount Lemmon	Mount Lemmon Survey	·	1.7 km	MPC · JPL
643295	2006 AR_{111}	—	October 10, 2008	Mount Lemmon	Mount Lemmon Survey	V	550 m	MPC · JPL
643296	2006 AD_{112}	—	December 8, 2015	Haleakala	Pan-STARRS 1	H	500 m	MPC · JPL
643297	2006 AA_{113}	—	January 18, 2015	Haleakala	Pan-STARRS 1	·	1.4 km	MPC · JPL
643298	2006 AR_{113}	—	June 11, 2018	Haleakala	Pan-STARRS 1	EOS	1.4 km	MPC · JPL
643299	2006 AD_{114}	—	January 6, 2006	Mount Lemmon	Mount Lemmon Survey	·	1.7 km	MPC · JPL
643300	2006 AE_{114}	—	January 7, 2006	Mount Lemmon	Mount Lemmon Survey	·	1.6 km	MPC · JPL

== 643301–643400 ==
back to top

Designation			Discovery			Properties		Ref
Permanent	Provisional	Named after	Date	Site	Discoverer(s)	Category	Diam.	Ref
643301	2006 AQ_{114}	—	January 7, 2006	Kitt Peak	Spacewatch	AGN	1 km	MPC · JPL
643302	2006 AR_{114}	—	January 7, 2006	Mount Lemmon	Mount Lemmon Survey	MAS	510 m	MPC · JPL
643303	2006 AE_{115}	—	January 10, 2006	Mount Lemmon	Mount Lemmon Survey	AGN	960 m	MPC · JPL
643304	2006 AH_{115}	—	January 10, 2006	Kitt Peak	Spacewatch	·	640 m	MPC · JPL
643305	2006 AU_{115}	—	January 7, 2006	Kitt Peak	Spacewatch	MAS	650 m	MPC · JPL
643306	2006 AJ_{117}	—	January 8, 2006	Kitt Peak	Spacewatch	VER	2.4 km	MPC · JPL
643307	2006 BB_{10}	—	January 22, 2006	Mount Lemmon	Mount Lemmon Survey	NYS	1.2 km	MPC · JPL
643308	2006 BR_{14}	—	January 22, 2006	Mount Lemmon	Mount Lemmon Survey	·	2.3 km	MPC · JPL
643309	2006 BX_{17}	—	January 22, 2006	Mount Lemmon	Mount Lemmon Survey	·	850 m	MPC · JPL
643310	2006 BQ_{18}	—	December 25, 2005	Mount Lemmon	Mount Lemmon Survey	NYS	890 m	MPC · JPL
643311	2006 BA_{22}	—	December 6, 2005	Mount Lemmon	Mount Lemmon Survey	AST	1.9 km	MPC · JPL
643312	2006 BL_{24}	—	January 23, 2006	Mount Lemmon	Mount Lemmon Survey	MAS	600 m	MPC · JPL
643313	2006 BL_{26}	—	January 24, 2006	Piszkéstető	K. Sárneczky	·	2.6 km	MPC · JPL
643314	2006 BO_{27}	—	January 22, 2006	Mount Lemmon	Mount Lemmon Survey	(5)	1.2 km	MPC · JPL
643315	2006 BD_{29}	—	January 23, 2006	Mount Lemmon	Mount Lemmon Survey	NYS	770 m	MPC · JPL
643316	2006 BR_{32}	—	October 24, 2005	Mauna Kea	A. Boattini	·	810 m	MPC · JPL
643317	2006 BJ_{37}	—	January 6, 2006	Kitt Peak	Spacewatch	·	1.4 km	MPC · JPL
643318	2006 BP_{37}	—	December 30, 2005	Kitt Peak	Spacewatch	·	1.9 km	MPC · JPL
643319	2006 BV_{38}	—	November 30, 2005	Palomar	NEAT	·	2.2 km	MPC · JPL
643320	2006 BN_{39}	—	January 24, 2006	Mount Nyukasa	Japan Aerospace Exploration Agency	·	1.8 km	MPC · JPL
643321	2006 BZ_{43}	—	January 8, 2006	Mount Lemmon	Mount Lemmon Survey	T_{j} (2.94)	3.1 km	MPC · JPL
643322	2006 BZ_{46}	—	January 24, 2006	Socorro	LINEAR	·	780 m	MPC · JPL
643323	2006 BM_{49}	—	January 4, 2006	Kitt Peak	Spacewatch	MAS	490 m	MPC · JPL
643324	2006 BK_{51}	—	January 25, 2006	Kitt Peak	Spacewatch	·	1.3 km	MPC · JPL
643325	2006 BJ_{52}	—	January 25, 2006	Kitt Peak	Spacewatch	·	1.5 km	MPC · JPL
643326	2006 BY_{52}	—	December 24, 2005	Kitt Peak	Spacewatch	·	870 m	MPC · JPL
643327	2006 BC_{58}	—	December 2, 2005	Kitt Peak	Wasserman, L. H., Millis, R. L.	·	1.1 km	MPC · JPL
643328	2006 BT_{58}	—	January 23, 2006	Kitt Peak	Spacewatch	H	480 m	MPC · JPL
643329	2006 BW_{62}	—	January 20, 2006	Kitt Peak	Spacewatch	MAS	530 m	MPC · JPL
643330	2006 BF_{64}	—	December 1, 2005	Kitt Peak	Wasserman, L. H., Millis, R. L.	·	740 m	MPC · JPL
643331	2006 BH_{64}	—	January 22, 2006	Mount Lemmon	Mount Lemmon Survey	DOR	1.9 km	MPC · JPL
643332	2006 BN_{64}	—	January 6, 2006	Kitt Peak	Spacewatch	NEM	1.7 km	MPC · JPL
643333	2006 BW_{64}	—	January 22, 2006	Mount Lemmon	Mount Lemmon Survey	(5)	1.0 km	MPC · JPL
643334	2006 BL_{65}	—	January 23, 2006	Kitt Peak	Spacewatch	GEF	1.2 km	MPC · JPL
643335	2006 BO_{65}	—	January 23, 2006	Kitt Peak	Spacewatch	·	1.7 km	MPC · JPL
643336	2006 BT_{66}	—	January 23, 2006	Kitt Peak	Spacewatch	·	790 m	MPC · JPL
643337	2006 BL_{69}	—	January 23, 2006	Kitt Peak	Spacewatch	·	770 m	MPC · JPL
643338	2006 BT_{69}	—	January 23, 2006	Kitt Peak	Spacewatch	MRX	770 m	MPC · JPL
643339	2006 BJ_{70}	—	January 23, 2006	Kitt Peak	Spacewatch	AGN	980 m	MPC · JPL
643340	2006 BX_{70}	—	January 23, 2006	Kitt Peak	Spacewatch	·	1.5 km	MPC · JPL
643341	2006 BJ_{71}	—	January 23, 2006	Kitt Peak	Spacewatch	·	1.0 km	MPC · JPL
643342	2006 BZ_{75}	—	January 23, 2006	Kitt Peak	Spacewatch	·	910 m	MPC · JPL
643343	2006 BP_{89}	—	January 7, 2006	Mount Lemmon	Mount Lemmon Survey	GEF	1.1 km	MPC · JPL
643344	2006 BZ_{91}	—	January 26, 2006	Mount Lemmon	Mount Lemmon Survey	·	1.4 km	MPC · JPL
643345	2006 BB_{102}	—	January 23, 2006	Mount Lemmon	Mount Lemmon Survey	·	890 m	MPC · JPL
643346	2006 BO_{104}	—	January 25, 2006	Kitt Peak	Spacewatch	·	1.6 km	MPC · JPL
643347	2006 BE_{106}	—	January 7, 2006	Mount Lemmon	Mount Lemmon Survey	·	1.9 km	MPC · JPL
643348	2006 BE_{111}	—	January 25, 2006	Kitt Peak	Spacewatch	·	1.5 km	MPC · JPL
643349	2006 BC_{112}	—	January 25, 2006	Kitt Peak	Spacewatch	·	2.7 km	MPC · JPL
643350	2006 BT_{113}	—	January 25, 2006	Kitt Peak	Spacewatch	·	1.5 km	MPC · JPL
643351	2006 BQ_{116}	—	January 26, 2006	Kitt Peak	Spacewatch	NYS	820 m	MPC · JPL
643352	2006 BG_{119}	—	January 26, 2006	Kitt Peak	Spacewatch	·	1.6 km	MPC · JPL
643353	2006 BP_{120}	—	January 26, 2006	Kitt Peak	Spacewatch	·	1.1 km	MPC · JPL
643354	2006 BQ_{128}	—	January 26, 2006	Mount Lemmon	Mount Lemmon Survey	V	590 m	MPC · JPL
643355	2006 BD_{131}	—	January 26, 2006	Kitt Peak	Spacewatch	·	1.6 km	MPC · JPL
643356	2006 BR_{132}	—	January 26, 2006	Kitt Peak	Spacewatch	·	1.7 km	MPC · JPL
643357	2006 BQ_{133}	—	January 26, 2006	Kitt Peak	Spacewatch	·	940 m	MPC · JPL
643358	2006 BG_{139}	—	January 28, 2006	Mount Lemmon	Mount Lemmon Survey	·	3.1 km	MPC · JPL
643359	2006 BL_{141}	—	January 25, 2006	Kitt Peak	Spacewatch	NYS	720 m	MPC · JPL
643360	2006 BO_{144}	—	January 23, 2006	Catalina	CSS	·	1.5 km	MPC · JPL
643361	2006 BQ_{153}	—	January 25, 2006	Kitt Peak	Spacewatch	·	1.6 km	MPC · JPL
643362	2006 BD_{154}	—	January 25, 2006	Kitt Peak	Spacewatch	·	1.8 km	MPC · JPL
643363	2006 BC_{159}	—	January 26, 2006	Kitt Peak	Spacewatch	·	1 km	MPC · JPL
643364	2006 BW_{159}	—	January 26, 2006	Kitt Peak	Spacewatch	·	730 m	MPC · JPL
643365	2006 BY_{167}	—	January 26, 2006	Mount Lemmon	Mount Lemmon Survey	AGN	1.0 km	MPC · JPL
643366	2006 BG_{172}	—	January 8, 2006	Mount Lemmon	Mount Lemmon Survey	·	900 m	MPC · JPL
643367	2006 BE_{174}	—	January 27, 2006	Kitt Peak	Spacewatch	AGN	920 m	MPC · JPL
643368	2006 BP_{176}	—	January 27, 2006	Kitt Peak	Spacewatch	·	1.7 km	MPC · JPL
643369	2006 BV_{176}	—	January 27, 2006	Kitt Peak	Spacewatch	CLA	1.1 km	MPC · JPL
643370	2006 BG_{179}	—	January 7, 2006	Mount Lemmon	Mount Lemmon Survey	·	850 m	MPC · JPL
643371	2006 BO_{180}	—	October 24, 2005	Mauna Kea	A. Boattini	EOS	2.1 km	MPC · JPL
643372	2006 BF_{182}	—	January 27, 2006	Mount Lemmon	Mount Lemmon Survey	·	1.0 km	MPC · JPL
643373	2006 BN_{184}	—	January 28, 2006	Mount Lemmon	Mount Lemmon Survey	V	440 m	MPC · JPL
643374	2006 BT_{188}	—	January 28, 2006	Kitt Peak	Spacewatch	V	640 m	MPC · JPL
643375	2006 BY_{189}	—	January 28, 2006	Kitt Peak	Spacewatch	·	970 m	MPC · JPL
643376	2006 BK_{199}	—	January 30, 2006	Kitt Peak	Spacewatch	·	980 m	MPC · JPL
643377	2006 BA_{201}	—	January 2, 2006	Mount Lemmon	Mount Lemmon Survey	·	820 m	MPC · JPL
643378	2006 BQ_{205}	—	January 31, 2006	Mount Lemmon	Mount Lemmon Survey	MAS	430 m	MPC · JPL
643379	2006 BX_{205}	—	October 24, 2005	Mauna Kea	A. Boattini	DOR	2.8 km	MPC · JPL
643380	2006 BX_{208}	—	January 31, 2006	Mount Lemmon	Mount Lemmon Survey	·	1.9 km	MPC · JPL
643381	2006 BS_{209}	—	January 31, 2006	Mount Lemmon	Mount Lemmon Survey	AGN	910 m	MPC · JPL
643382	2006 BR_{215}	—	January 25, 2006	Catalina	CSS	ERI	1.2 km	MPC · JPL
643383	2006 BK_{218}	—	January 27, 2006	Mount Lemmon	Mount Lemmon Survey	HOF	2.3 km	MPC · JPL
643384	2006 BB_{225}	—	January 30, 2006	Kitt Peak	Spacewatch	·	940 m	MPC · JPL
643385	2006 BA_{231}	—	January 23, 2006	Kitt Peak	Spacewatch	NYS	790 m	MPC · JPL
643386	2006 BW_{241}	—	January 31, 2006	Kitt Peak	Spacewatch	·	760 m	MPC · JPL
643387	2006 BG_{243}	—	January 31, 2006	Kitt Peak	Spacewatch	·	1.8 km	MPC · JPL
643388	2006 BK_{243}	—	February 8, 2002	Kitt Peak	Deep Ecliptic Survey	·	1.1 km	MPC · JPL
643389	2006 BZ_{243}	—	January 31, 2006	Kitt Peak	Spacewatch	·	1.1 km	MPC · JPL
643390	2006 BO_{260}	—	October 23, 2004	Kitt Peak	Spacewatch	AST	1.5 km	MPC · JPL
643391	2006 BS_{262}	—	January 31, 2006	Kitt Peak	Spacewatch	·	850 m	MPC · JPL
643392	2006 BS_{263}	—	January 31, 2006	Kitt Peak	Spacewatch	GEF	1.2 km	MPC · JPL
643393	2006 BU_{272}	—	January 7, 2006	Mount Lemmon	Mount Lemmon Survey	·	850 m	MPC · JPL
643394	2006 BK_{279}	—	January 23, 2006	Mount Lemmon	Mount Lemmon Survey	MAS	580 m	MPC · JPL
643395	2006 BR_{285}	—	January 7, 2006	Mount Lemmon	Mount Lemmon Survey	·	2.2 km	MPC · JPL
643396	2006 BE_{286}	—	January 21, 2006	Mount Lemmon	Mount Lemmon Survey	NYS	1.0 km	MPC · JPL
643397	2006 BV_{286}	—	September 8, 2008	Kitt Peak	Spacewatch	·	1.4 km	MPC · JPL
643398	2006 BD_{287}	—	September 25, 2011	Haleakala	Pan-STARRS 1	·	550 m	MPC · JPL
643399	2006 BO_{287}	—	January 30, 2006	Kitt Peak	Spacewatch	·	920 m	MPC · JPL
643400	2006 BR_{287}	—	March 10, 1997	Kitt Peak	Spacewatch	·	2.0 km	MPC · JPL

== 643401–643500 ==
back to top

Designation			Discovery			Properties		Ref
Permanent	Provisional	Named after	Date	Site	Discoverer(s)	Category	Diam.	Ref
643401	2006 BW_{287}	—	January 31, 2006	Kitt Peak	Spacewatch	HOF	2.2 km	MPC · JPL
643402	2006 BX_{287}	—	January 23, 2006	Kitt Peak	Spacewatch	(5)	1.1 km	MPC · JPL
643403	2006 BW_{290}	—	January 23, 2006	Kitt Peak	Spacewatch	MAS	540 m	MPC · JPL
643404	2006 BB_{291}	—	September 5, 2008	Kitt Peak	Spacewatch	·	860 m	MPC · JPL
643405	2006 BH_{291}	—	September 14, 2013	Haleakala	Pan-STARRS 1	·	1.5 km	MPC · JPL
643406	2006 BU_{291}	—	January 31, 2006	Kitt Peak	Spacewatch	·	980 m	MPC · JPL
643407	2006 BA_{292}	—	December 23, 2014	Mount Lemmon	Mount Lemmon Survey	AGN	1.1 km	MPC · JPL
643408	2006 BW_{292}	—	January 31, 2006	Kitt Peak	Spacewatch	H	440 m	MPC · JPL
643409	2006 BN_{295}	—	January 23, 2006	Kitt Peak	Spacewatch	NYS	980 m	MPC · JPL
643410	2006 BE_{296}	—	January 27, 2006	Kitt Peak	Spacewatch	V	510 m	MPC · JPL
643411	2006 BM_{296}	—	November 8, 2008	Mount Lemmon	Mount Lemmon Survey	·	850 m	MPC · JPL
643412	2006 BB_{297}	—	January 30, 2006	Kitt Peak	Spacewatch	·	1.5 km	MPC · JPL
643413	2006 BD_{297}	—	January 23, 2006	Kitt Peak	Spacewatch	AGN	980 m	MPC · JPL
643414	2006 BO_{297}	—	January 30, 2006	Kitt Peak	Spacewatch	AGN	1.1 km	MPC · JPL
643415	2006 BP_{297}	—	January 23, 2006	Mount Lemmon	Mount Lemmon Survey	·	1.8 km	MPC · JPL
643416	2006 BL_{298}	—	January 30, 2006	Kitt Peak	Spacewatch	·	980 m	MPC · JPL
643417	2006 BW_{298}	—	January 27, 2006	Kitt Peak	Spacewatch	HOF	1.9 km	MPC · JPL
643418	2006 BB_{300}	—	December 29, 2005	Kitt Peak	Spacewatch	·	1.6 km	MPC · JPL
643419	2006 BQ_{300}	—	January 26, 2006	Mount Lemmon	Mount Lemmon Survey	V	490 m	MPC · JPL
643420	2006 BT_{301}	—	January 22, 2006	Mount Lemmon	Mount Lemmon Survey	·	1.4 km	MPC · JPL
643421	2006 BL_{303}	—	January 26, 2006	Kitt Peak	Spacewatch	·	810 m	MPC · JPL
643422	2006 CR_{1}	—	January 23, 2006	Kitt Peak	Spacewatch	·	2.0 km	MPC · JPL
643423	2006 CC_{3}	—	January 22, 2006	Mount Lemmon	Mount Lemmon Survey	·	1.0 km	MPC · JPL
643424	2006 CE_{3}	—	February 1, 2006	Mount Lemmon	Mount Lemmon Survey	·	1.5 km	MPC · JPL
643425	2006 CS_{3}	—	February 1, 2006	Mount Lemmon	Mount Lemmon Survey	MRX	990 m	MPC · JPL
643426	2006 CV_{3}	—	February 1, 2006	Mount Lemmon	Mount Lemmon Survey	AGN	950 m	MPC · JPL
643427	2006 CP_{4}	—	February 1, 2006	Mount Lemmon	Mount Lemmon Survey	·	960 m	MPC · JPL
643428	2006 CL_{5}	—	February 1, 2006	Kitt Peak	Spacewatch	NYS	1.0 km	MPC · JPL
643429	2006 CT_{5}	—	February 1, 2006	Mount Lemmon	Mount Lemmon Survey	·	1.1 km	MPC · JPL
643430	2006 CB_{6}	—	February 1, 2006	Mount Lemmon	Mount Lemmon Survey	·	1.8 km	MPC · JPL
643431	2006 CM_{7}	—	January 31, 2006	Mount Lemmon	Mount Lemmon Survey	·	1.1 km	MPC · JPL
643432	2006 CL_{14}	—	February 1, 2006	Kitt Peak	Spacewatch	·	1.2 km	MPC · JPL
643433	2006 CE_{15}	—	February 1, 2006	Kitt Peak	Spacewatch	·	1.1 km	MPC · JPL
643434	2006 CF_{15}	—	February 1, 2006	Kitt Peak	Spacewatch	EUN	990 m	MPC · JPL
643435	2006 CJ_{20}	—	January 22, 2006	Mount Lemmon	Mount Lemmon Survey	·	1.9 km	MPC · JPL
643436	2006 CN_{25}	—	February 2, 2006	Kitt Peak	Spacewatch	·	1.7 km	MPC · JPL
643437	2006 CG_{26}	—	January 25, 2006	Kitt Peak	Spacewatch	WIT	920 m	MPC · JPL
643438	2006 CR_{26}	—	December 2, 2005	Kitt Peak	Wasserman, L. H., Millis, R. L.	NYS	680 m	MPC · JPL
643439	2006 CH_{27}	—	February 2, 2006	Kitt Peak	Spacewatch	·	1.1 km	MPC · JPL
643440	2006 CC_{32}	—	October 24, 2005	Mauna Kea	A. Boattini	·	2.3 km	MPC · JPL
643441	2006 CJ_{33}	—	October 7, 2004	Kitt Peak	Spacewatch	·	1.2 km	MPC · JPL
643442	2006 CX_{34}	—	February 2, 2006	Mount Lemmon	Mount Lemmon Survey	DOR	1.9 km	MPC · JPL
643443	2006 CH_{42}	—	February 2, 2006	Kitt Peak	Spacewatch	·	1.4 km	MPC · JPL
643444	2006 CN_{44}	—	January 23, 2006	Kitt Peak	Spacewatch	·	800 m	MPC · JPL
643445	2006 CR_{45}	—	January 23, 2006	Mount Lemmon	Mount Lemmon Survey	·	890 m	MPC · JPL
643446	2006 CV_{47}	—	January 30, 2006	Kitt Peak	Spacewatch	·	1.9 km	MPC · JPL
643447	2006 CC_{48}	—	February 4, 2006	Mount Lemmon	Mount Lemmon Survey	·	1.5 km	MPC · JPL
643448	2006 CE_{49}	—	February 4, 2006	Mount Lemmon	Mount Lemmon Survey	·	2.0 km	MPC · JPL
643449	2006 CO_{52}	—	February 4, 2006	Kitt Peak	Spacewatch	·	1.5 km	MPC · JPL
643450	2006 CA_{54}	—	January 23, 2006	Kitt Peak	Spacewatch	·	1.2 km	MPC · JPL
643451	2006 CS_{54}	—	January 23, 2006	Mount Lemmon	Mount Lemmon Survey	·	840 m	MPC · JPL
643452	2006 CD_{58}	—	January 7, 2006	Mount Lemmon	Mount Lemmon Survey	·	820 m	MPC · JPL
643453	2006 CH_{59}	—	February 6, 2006	Kitt Peak	Spacewatch	·	880 m	MPC · JPL
643454	2006 CT_{63}	—	February 2, 2006	Mauna Kea	P. A. Wiegert	·	2.4 km	MPC · JPL
643455	2006 CN_{68}	—	February 26, 2011	Kitt Peak	Spacewatch	WIT	1 km	MPC · JPL
643456	2006 CT_{70}	—	February 3, 2006	Mauna Kea	P. A. Wiegert, R. Rasmussen	MAS	570 m	MPC · JPL
643457	2006 CH_{73}	—	February 25, 2011	Mount Lemmon	Mount Lemmon Survey	HOF	2.3 km	MPC · JPL
643458	2006 CG_{76}	—	January 22, 2006	Mount Lemmon	Mount Lemmon Survey	·	1.7 km	MPC · JPL
643459	2006 CP_{77}	—	October 10, 2008	Mount Lemmon	Mount Lemmon Survey	·	890 m	MPC · JPL
643460	2006 CQ_{77}	—	January 26, 2006	Mount Lemmon	Mount Lemmon Survey	·	1.6 km	MPC · JPL
643461	2006 CM_{79}	—	February 3, 2006	Mauna Kea	P. A. Wiegert, R. Rasmussen	·	840 m	MPC · JPL
643462	2006 CM_{81}	—	February 5, 2006	Mount Lemmon	Mount Lemmon Survey	·	1.7 km	MPC · JPL
643463	2006 CS_{81}	—	February 1, 2006	Kitt Peak	Spacewatch	·	1.1 km	MPC · JPL
643464	2006 CU_{81}	—	February 1, 2006	Kitt Peak	Spacewatch	·	1.5 km	MPC · JPL
643465	2006 CY_{81}	—	January 18, 2013	Mount Lemmon	Mount Lemmon Survey	·	1.0 km	MPC · JPL
643466	2006 CK_{82}	—	March 18, 2010	Mount Lemmon	Mount Lemmon Survey	·	1.1 km	MPC · JPL
643467	2006 CK_{83}	—	August 27, 2014	Haleakala	Pan-STARRS 1	EOS	1.4 km	MPC · JPL
643468	2006 CQ_{83}	—	February 4, 2006	Kitt Peak	Spacewatch	GAL	1.4 km	MPC · JPL
643469	2006 CW_{83}	—	January 16, 2015	Haleakala	Pan-STARRS 1	PAD	1.4 km	MPC · JPL
643470	2006 CT_{84}	—	December 8, 2012	Mount Lemmon	Mount Lemmon Survey	NYS	710 m	MPC · JPL
643471	2006 CM_{86}	—	January 9, 2016	Haleakala	Pan-STARRS 1	L5	8.5 km	MPC · JPL
643472	2006 CT_{86}	—	January 4, 2012	Mount Lemmon	Mount Lemmon Survey	·	4.0 km	MPC · JPL
643473	2006 CZ_{86}	—	February 7, 2006	Mount Lemmon	Mount Lemmon Survey	·	760 m	MPC · JPL
643474	2006 CA_{87}	—	November 6, 2010	Mount Lemmon	Mount Lemmon Survey	·	2.8 km	MPC · JPL
643475	2006 CG_{87}	—	October 2, 2013	Haleakala	Pan-STARRS 1	·	1.5 km	MPC · JPL
643476	2006 CB_{88}	—	December 21, 2014	Mount Lemmon	Mount Lemmon Survey	AGN	930 m	MPC · JPL
643477	2006 CC_{88}	—	February 1, 2006	Kitt Peak	Spacewatch	·	1.3 km	MPC · JPL
643478	2006 CP_{88}	—	August 9, 2015	Haleakala	Pan-STARRS 1	·	2.6 km	MPC · JPL
643479	2006 CB_{90}	—	February 4, 2006	Kitt Peak	Spacewatch	·	1.7 km	MPC · JPL
643480	2006 DW_{2}	—	January 30, 2006	Kitt Peak	Spacewatch	·	1.6 km	MPC · JPL
643481	2006 DF_{5}	—	January 31, 2006	Catalina	CSS	PHO	750 m	MPC · JPL
643482	2006 DQ_{11}	—	January 10, 2006	Kitt Peak	Spacewatch	·	820 m	MPC · JPL
643483	2006 DO_{19}	—	November 7, 2005	Mauna Kea	A. Boattini	·	780 m	MPC · JPL
643484	2006 DM_{24}	—	February 4, 2006	Kitt Peak	Spacewatch	·	1.4 km	MPC · JPL
643485	2006 DZ_{35}	—	February 20, 2006	Kitt Peak	Spacewatch	·	1.1 km	MPC · JPL
643486	2006 DV_{41}	—	February 2, 2006	Mount Lemmon	Mount Lemmon Survey	·	1.2 km	MPC · JPL
643487	2006 DQ_{42}	—	February 20, 2006	Kitt Peak	Spacewatch	·	940 m	MPC · JPL
643488	2006 DK_{55}	—	February 24, 2006	Mount Lemmon	Mount Lemmon Survey	LIX	2.8 km	MPC · JPL
643489	2006 DZ_{60}	—	December 3, 2005	Mauna Kea	A. Boattini	NYS	900 m	MPC · JPL
643490	2006 DE_{61}	—	February 24, 2006	Kitt Peak	Spacewatch	H	390 m	MPC · JPL
643491	2006 DW_{72}	—	July 23, 2015	Haleakala	Pan-STARRS 1	·	980 m	MPC · JPL
643492	2006 DJ_{76}	—	January 31, 2006	Kitt Peak	Spacewatch	NYS	1.2 km	MPC · JPL
643493	2006 DU_{79}	—	February 24, 2006	Kitt Peak	Spacewatch	·	1.4 km	MPC · JPL
643494	2006 DQ_{80}	—	February 24, 2006	Kitt Peak	Spacewatch	MAS	540 m	MPC · JPL
643495	2006 DP_{83}	—	February 24, 2006	Kitt Peak	Spacewatch	·	1.7 km	MPC · JPL
643496	2006 DM_{86}	—	February 24, 2006	Kitt Peak	Spacewatch	·	940 m	MPC · JPL
643497	2006 DO_{89}	—	February 24, 2006	Kitt Peak	Spacewatch	·	2.7 km	MPC · JPL
643498	2006 DE_{98}	—	February 25, 2006	Kitt Peak	Spacewatch	PHO	630 m	MPC · JPL
643499	2006 DG_{101}	—	January 7, 2006	Mount Lemmon	Mount Lemmon Survey	·	830 m	MPC · JPL
643500	2006 DM_{107}	—	February 25, 2006	Kitt Peak	Spacewatch	NYS	1.1 km	MPC · JPL

== 643501–643600 ==
back to top

Designation			Discovery			Properties		Ref
Permanent	Provisional	Named after	Date	Site	Discoverer(s)	Category	Diam.	Ref
643501	2006 DD_{108}	—	February 25, 2006	Kitt Peak	Spacewatch	·	1.9 km	MPC · JPL
643502	2006 DR_{108}	—	February 25, 2006	Kitt Peak	Spacewatch	·	1.4 km	MPC · JPL
643503	2006 DR_{113}	—	February 27, 2006	Kitt Peak	Spacewatch	·	1.8 km	MPC · JPL
643504	2006 DE_{116}	—	February 27, 2006	Kitt Peak	Spacewatch	·	1.9 km	MPC · JPL
643505	2006 DM_{116}	—	February 27, 2006	Kitt Peak	Spacewatch	·	890 m	MPC · JPL
643506	2006 DJ_{125}	—	January 23, 2006	Catalina	CSS	·	1.8 km	MPC · JPL
643507	2006 DM_{125}	—	February 25, 2006	Kitt Peak	Spacewatch	·	2.0 km	MPC · JPL
643508	2006 DY_{126}	—	February 2, 2006	Kitt Peak	Spacewatch	(5)	970 m	MPC · JPL
643509	2006 DL_{127}	—	January 25, 2006	Kitt Peak	Spacewatch	V	450 m	MPC · JPL
643510	2006 DG_{130}	—	February 25, 2006	Kitt Peak	Spacewatch	AEO	970 m	MPC · JPL
643511	2006 DZ_{132}	—	February 25, 2006	Kitt Peak	Spacewatch	·	1.8 km	MPC · JPL
643512	2006 DW_{135}	—	September 2, 2000	Anderson Mesa	LONEOS	PHO	800 m	MPC · JPL
643513	2006 DM_{136}	—	February 25, 2006	Kitt Peak	Spacewatch	·	1.5 km	MPC · JPL
643514	2006 DK_{138}	—	February 25, 2006	Kitt Peak	Spacewatch	KOR	1.3 km	MPC · JPL
643515	2006 DB_{143}	—	February 25, 2006	Kitt Peak	Spacewatch	MAS	610 m	MPC · JPL
643516	2006 DO_{151}	—	September 16, 2003	Kitt Peak	Spacewatch	·	2.0 km	MPC · JPL
643517	2006 DR_{151}	—	February 25, 2006	Kitt Peak	Spacewatch	·	1.1 km	MPC · JPL
643518	2006 DG_{165}	—	February 27, 2006	Kitt Peak	Spacewatch	PHO	870 m	MPC · JPL
643519	2006 DQ_{170}	—	February 27, 2006	Kitt Peak	Spacewatch	·	1.3 km	MPC · JPL
643520	2006 DX_{170}	—	April 4, 1995	Kitt Peak	Spacewatch	·	1 km	MPC · JPL
643521	2006 DM_{172}	—	February 27, 2006	Kitt Peak	Spacewatch	·	2.0 km	MPC · JPL
643522	2006 DO_{178}	—	February 27, 2006	Mount Lemmon	Mount Lemmon Survey	·	1.0 km	MPC · JPL
643523	2006 DO_{180}	—	December 3, 2005	Mauna Kea	A. Boattini	·	1.1 km	MPC · JPL
643524	2006 DF_{182}	—	February 27, 2006	Mount Lemmon	Mount Lemmon Survey	AEO	1.1 km	MPC · JPL
643525	2006 DX_{182}	—	February 27, 2006	Kitt Peak	Spacewatch	·	990 m	MPC · JPL
643526	2006 DD_{183}	—	June 6, 2003	Kitt Peak	Spacewatch	·	1.4 km	MPC · JPL
643527	2006 DU_{188}	—	February 27, 2006	Kitt Peak	Spacewatch	·	1.4 km	MPC · JPL
643528	2006 DF_{189}	—	February 27, 2006	Kitt Peak	Spacewatch	·	900 m	MPC · JPL
643529	2006 DO_{194}	—	December 1, 2005	Kitt Peak	Wasserman, L. H., Millis, R. L.	·	860 m	MPC · JPL
643530	2006 DA_{206}	—	February 25, 2006	Kitt Peak	Spacewatch	·	3.1 km	MPC · JPL
643531	2006 DX_{208}	—	February 27, 2006	Kitt Peak	Spacewatch	·	1.7 km	MPC · JPL
643532	2006 DS_{219}	—	February 20, 2006	Mount Lemmon	Mount Lemmon Survey	·	860 m	MPC · JPL
643533	2006 DF_{220}	—	August 26, 2012	Haleakala	Pan-STARRS 1	·	1.8 km	MPC · JPL
643534	2006 DG_{220}	—	October 28, 2008	Kitt Peak	Spacewatch	NYS	890 m	MPC · JPL
643535	2006 DJ_{220}	—	February 24, 2006	Kitt Peak	Spacewatch	·	1.2 km	MPC · JPL
643536	2006 DQ_{221}	—	December 12, 2004	Socorro	LINEAR	THB	2.4 km	MPC · JPL
643537	2006 DV_{221}	—	February 17, 2015	Haleakala	Pan-STARRS 1	AGN	1 km	MPC · JPL
643538	2006 DG_{222}	—	January 27, 2006	Kitt Peak	Spacewatch	·	1.9 km	MPC · JPL
643539	2006 DO_{222}	—	October 2, 2013	Haleakala	Pan-STARRS 1	·	1.6 km	MPC · JPL
643540	2006 DV_{222}	—	May 30, 2015	Haleakala	Pan-STARRS 1	·	1 km	MPC · JPL
643541	2006 DX_{222}	—	February 25, 2006	Kitt Peak	Spacewatch	·	2.5 km	MPC · JPL
643542	2006 DH_{223}	—	November 8, 2008	Mount Lemmon	Mount Lemmon Survey	·	900 m	MPC · JPL
643543	2006 DX_{223}	—	August 7, 2008	Kitt Peak	Spacewatch	·	1.5 km	MPC · JPL
643544	2006 ET_{3}	—	March 2, 2006	Kitt Peak	Spacewatch	·	2.3 km	MPC · JPL
643545	2006 EZ_{3}	—	February 4, 2006	Kitt Peak	Spacewatch	·	1.6 km	MPC · JPL
643546	2006 EO_{4}	—	March 2, 2006	Kitt Peak	Spacewatch	·	840 m	MPC · JPL
643547	2006 EE_{8}	—	February 20, 2006	Kitt Peak	Spacewatch	MAS	570 m	MPC · JPL
643548	2006 EL_{17}	—	March 2, 2006	Kitt Peak	Spacewatch	·	1.0 km	MPC · JPL
643549	2006 ES_{20}	—	January 27, 2006	Mount Lemmon	Mount Lemmon Survey	MAS	600 m	MPC · JPL
643550	2006 EK_{24}	—	January 31, 2006	Kitt Peak	Spacewatch	·	1.1 km	MPC · JPL
643551	2006 EF_{28}	—	March 3, 2006	Kitt Peak	Spacewatch	·	1.0 km	MPC · JPL
643552	2006 EZ_{29}	—	February 27, 2006	Kitt Peak	Spacewatch	·	2.3 km	MPC · JPL
643553	2006 EL_{30}	—	September 19, 1998	Apache Point	SDSS	EOS	1.4 km	MPC · JPL
643554	2006 EQ_{30}	—	March 3, 2006	Kitt Peak	Spacewatch	·	1.2 km	MPC · JPL
643555	2006 EN_{31}	—	March 3, 2006	Kitt Peak	Spacewatch	NYS	850 m	MPC · JPL
643556	2006 ED_{33}	—	March 3, 2006	Kitt Peak	Spacewatch	·	1.2 km	MPC · JPL
643557	2006 ED_{35}	—	March 3, 2006	Kitt Peak	Spacewatch	·	1.2 km	MPC · JPL
643558	2006 EA_{37}	—	January 10, 2006	Mount Lemmon	Mount Lemmon Survey	·	2.3 km	MPC · JPL
643559	2006 EV_{39}	—	March 4, 2006	Mount Lemmon	Mount Lemmon Survey	MAS	560 m	MPC · JPL
643560	2006 EX_{42}	—	March 4, 2006	Kitt Peak	Spacewatch	(5)	920 m	MPC · JPL
643561	2006 EN_{43}	—	March 5, 2006	Mount Lemmon	Mount Lemmon Survey	·	1.7 km	MPC · JPL
643562	2006 ES_{43}	—	March 4, 2006	Kitt Peak	Spacewatch	MAS	540 m	MPC · JPL
643563	2006 EO_{48}	—	February 1, 2006	Kitt Peak	Spacewatch	NYS	910 m	MPC · JPL
643564	2006 EB_{49}	—	March 4, 2006	Kitt Peak	Spacewatch	NYS	1.2 km	MPC · JPL
643565	2006 EV_{49}	—	February 21, 2006	Catalina	CSS	H	430 m	MPC · JPL
643566	2006 ET_{54}	—	March 5, 2006	Kitt Peak	Spacewatch	·	1.1 km	MPC · JPL
643567	2006 ER_{58}	—	March 5, 2006	Kitt Peak	Spacewatch	·	1.8 km	MPC · JPL
643568	2006 EO_{73}	—	March 3, 2006	Kitt Peak	Spacewatch	·	1.5 km	MPC · JPL
643569	2006 ED_{76}	—	November 1, 1999	Kitt Peak	Spacewatch	·	1.7 km	MPC · JPL
643570	2006 EP_{76}	—	September 7, 2011	Kitt Peak	Spacewatch	V	620 m	MPC · JPL
643571	2006 FZ_{20}	—	March 4, 2006	Mount Lemmon	Mount Lemmon Survey	·	1.4 km	MPC · JPL
643572	2006 FD_{38}	—	March 23, 2006	Kitt Peak	Spacewatch	NYS	900 m	MPC · JPL
643573	2006 FM_{40}	—	March 25, 2006	Kitt Peak	Spacewatch	·	1.9 km	MPC · JPL
643574	2006 FE_{46}	—	March 25, 2006	Mount Lemmon	Mount Lemmon Survey	·	1.7 km	MPC · JPL
643575	2006 FB_{56}	—	March 24, 2006	Mount Lemmon	Mount Lemmon Survey	·	830 m	MPC · JPL
643576	2006 FG_{60}	—	October 9, 2008	Mount Lemmon	Mount Lemmon Survey	·	1.3 km	MPC · JPL
643577	2006 GP_{1}	—	April 2, 2006	Kitt Peak	Spacewatch	·	1.1 km	MPC · JPL
643578	2006 GB_{11}	—	April 2, 2006	Kitt Peak	Spacewatch	MAS	810 m	MPC · JPL
643579	2006 GF_{15}	—	April 2, 2006	Kitt Peak	Spacewatch	·	1.7 km	MPC · JPL
643580	2006 GT_{17}	—	April 2, 2006	Kitt Peak	Spacewatch	·	930 m	MPC · JPL
643581	2006 GQ_{26}	—	April 2, 2006	Kitt Peak	Spacewatch	·	1.0 km	MPC · JPL
643582	2006 GB_{35}	—	April 7, 2006	Kitt Peak	Spacewatch	MAS	810 m	MPC · JPL
643583	2006 GJ_{56}	—	November 19, 2007	Kitt Peak	Spacewatch	·	600 m	MPC · JPL
643584	2006 GQ_{56}	—	May 19, 2010	Mount Lemmon	Mount Lemmon Survey	ERI	1.3 km	MPC · JPL
643585	2006 HY_{14}	—	September 27, 2003	Kitt Peak	Spacewatch	·	1.8 km	MPC · JPL
643586	2006 HL_{20}	—	April 25, 2000	Kitt Peak	Spacewatch	·	930 m	MPC · JPL
643587	2006 HT_{21}	—	March 11, 2002	Palomar	NEAT	NYS	1.3 km	MPC · JPL
643588	2006 HM_{26}	—	April 20, 2006	Kitt Peak	Spacewatch	·	680 m	MPC · JPL
643589	2006 HS_{45}	—	April 25, 2006	Kitt Peak	Spacewatch	·	2.1 km	MPC · JPL
643590	2006 HX_{45}	—	February 12, 2002	Kitt Peak	Spacewatch	·	1.1 km	MPC · JPL
643591	2006 HD_{64}	—	April 24, 2006	Kitt Peak	Spacewatch	MAS	710 m	MPC · JPL
643592	2006 HP_{76}	—	April 25, 2006	Kitt Peak	Spacewatch	·	1.9 km	MPC · JPL
643593	2006 HJ_{83}	—	April 26, 2006	Kitt Peak	Spacewatch	·	1.3 km	MPC · JPL
643594	2006 HJ_{90}	—	April 26, 2006	Kitt Peak	Spacewatch	PHO	740 m	MPC · JPL
643595	2006 HT_{108}	—	April 30, 2006	Catalina	CSS	LIX	3.4 km	MPC · JPL
643596	2006 HZ_{119}	—	April 30, 2006	Kitt Peak	Spacewatch	BRA	1.5 km	MPC · JPL
643597	2006 HX_{126}	—	April 28, 2006	Cerro Tololo	Deep Ecliptic Survey	·	1 km	MPC · JPL
643598	2006 HS_{129}	—	January 31, 2006	Kitt Peak	Spacewatch	·	1.5 km	MPC · JPL
643599	2006 HL_{130}	—	April 26, 2006	Cerro Tololo	Deep Ecliptic Survey	·	630 m	MPC · JPL
643600	2006 HC_{131}	—	April 26, 2006	Cerro Tololo	Deep Ecliptic Survey	·	940 m	MPC · JPL

== 643601–643700 ==
back to top

Designation			Discovery			Properties		Ref
Permanent	Provisional	Named after	Date	Site	Discoverer(s)	Category	Diam.	Ref
643601	2006 HV_{134}	—	April 26, 2006	Cerro Tololo	Deep Ecliptic Survey	KOR	1.1 km	MPC · JPL
643602	2006 HO_{138}	—	April 26, 2006	Kitt Peak	Spacewatch	AGN	950 m	MPC · JPL
643603	2006 HM_{139}	—	April 26, 2006	Cerro Tololo	Deep Ecliptic Survey	NYS	970 m	MPC · JPL
643604	2006 HL_{141}	—	April 26, 2006	Cerro Tololo	Deep Ecliptic Survey	·	1.0 km	MPC · JPL
643605	2006 HJ_{145}	—	April 27, 2006	Cerro Tololo	Deep Ecliptic Survey	·	1.6 km	MPC · JPL
643606	2006 HO_{155}	—	October 28, 2008	Kitt Peak	Spacewatch	·	1.9 km	MPC · JPL
643607	2006 HB_{157}	—	April 26, 2006	Kitt Peak	Spacewatch	·	580 m	MPC · JPL
643608	2006 HX_{160}	—	April 29, 2006	Kitt Peak	Spacewatch	·	1.7 km	MPC · JPL
643609	2006 JN_{8}	—	May 1, 2006	Kitt Peak	Spacewatch	·	1.7 km	MPC · JPL
643610	2006 JD_{19}	—	May 2, 2006	Mount Lemmon	Mount Lemmon Survey	·	1.7 km	MPC · JPL
643611	2006 JD_{23}	—	April 25, 2006	Mount Lemmon	Mount Lemmon Survey	·	960 m	MPC · JPL
643612	2006 JR_{25}	—	March 25, 2006	Kitt Peak	Spacewatch	·	1.5 km	MPC · JPL
643613	2006 JO_{36}	—	May 4, 2006	Kitt Peak	Spacewatch	·	1.6 km	MPC · JPL
643614	2006 JO_{42}	—	November 24, 2003	Kitt Peak	Spacewatch	·	2.4 km	MPC · JPL
643615	2006 JS_{53}	—	May 6, 2006	Mount Lemmon	Mount Lemmon Survey	KOR	1.2 km	MPC · JPL
643616	2006 JN_{57}	—	May 7, 2006	Mount Lemmon	Mount Lemmon Survey	·	2.1 km	MPC · JPL
643617	2006 JQ_{62}	—	May 1, 2006	Kitt Peak	Deep Ecliptic Survey	·	1.2 km	MPC · JPL
643618	2006 JK_{63}	—	February 25, 2006	Mount Lemmon	Mount Lemmon Survey	·	1.3 km	MPC · JPL
643619	2006 JQ_{66}	—	May 1, 2006	Kitt Peak	Deep Ecliptic Survey	·	1.8 km	MPC · JPL
643620	2006 JQ_{73}	—	May 1, 2006	Mauna Kea	P. A. Wiegert	·	1.4 km	MPC · JPL
643621	2006 JB_{78}	—	March 25, 2006	Kitt Peak	Spacewatch	MRX	840 m	MPC · JPL
643622	2006 JE_{79}	—	December 15, 2001	Apache Point	SDSS Collaboration	·	540 m	MPC · JPL
643623	2006 JW_{80}	—	May 21, 2006	Kitt Peak	Spacewatch	·	2.4 km	MPC · JPL
643624	2006 JN_{83}	—	January 27, 2015	Haleakala	Pan-STARRS 1	·	1.6 km	MPC · JPL
643625	2006 JR_{83}	—	February 27, 2015	Haleakala	Pan-STARRS 1	KOR	1.0 km	MPC · JPL
643626	2006 JR_{84}	—	December 4, 2016	Mount Lemmon	Mount Lemmon Survey	·	1.5 km	MPC · JPL
643627	2006 JA_{85}	—	October 18, 2007	Kitt Peak	Spacewatch	·	1.0 km	MPC · JPL
643628	2006 JR_{85}	—	December 29, 2014	Haleakala	Pan-STARRS 1	·	530 m	MPC · JPL
643629	2006 JV_{85}	—	January 4, 2017	Haleakala	Pan-STARRS 1	·	1.1 km	MPC · JPL
643630	2006 JC_{86}	—	September 16, 2012	Mount Lemmon	Mount Lemmon Survey	KOR	1.2 km	MPC · JPL
643631	2006 JJ_{88}	—	May 5, 2006	Kitt Peak	Spacewatch	·	1.6 km	MPC · JPL
643632	2006 JA_{89}	—	May 6, 2006	Kitt Peak	Spacewatch	·	2.2 km	MPC · JPL
643633	2006 KV_{1}	—	May 19, 2006	Needville	W. G. Dillon, M. M. Eastman	·	2.2 km	MPC · JPL
643634	2006 KP_{10}	—	May 19, 2006	Mount Lemmon	Mount Lemmon Survey	MAS	630 m	MPC · JPL
643635	2006 KG_{24}	—	May 19, 2006	Mount Lemmon	Mount Lemmon Survey	·	1.9 km	MPC · JPL
643636	2006 KK_{25}	—	May 7, 2006	Mount Lemmon	Mount Lemmon Survey	·	1.8 km	MPC · JPL
643637	2006 KF_{29}	—	May 20, 2006	Kitt Peak	Spacewatch	EOS	1.8 km	MPC · JPL
643638	2006 KN_{31}	—	May 5, 2006	Kitt Peak	Spacewatch	·	970 m	MPC · JPL
643639	2006 KW_{33}	—	May 20, 2006	Kitt Peak	Spacewatch	NYS	940 m	MPC · JPL
643640	2006 KZ_{33}	—	May 20, 2006	Kitt Peak	Spacewatch	EOS	1.8 km	MPC · JPL
643641	2006 KP_{38}	—	May 21, 2006	Vail-Jarnac	Jarnac	·	1.9 km	MPC · JPL
643642	2006 KO_{47}	—	May 21, 2006	Mount Lemmon	Mount Lemmon Survey	EOS	3.1 km	MPC · JPL
643643	2006 KH_{55}	—	May 7, 2006	Mount Lemmon	Mount Lemmon Survey	PHO	760 m	MPC · JPL
643644	2006 KU_{56}	—	April 24, 2006	Kitt Peak	Spacewatch	·	810 m	MPC · JPL
643645	2006 KK_{62}	—	May 9, 2006	Mount Lemmon	Mount Lemmon Survey	PHO	730 m	MPC · JPL
643646	2006 KW_{68}	—	May 20, 2006	Kitt Peak	Spacewatch	·	2.3 km	MPC · JPL
643647	2006 KL_{72}	—	May 22, 2006	Kitt Peak	Spacewatch	·	980 m	MPC · JPL
643648	2006 KW_{79}	—	May 25, 2006	Mount Lemmon	Mount Lemmon Survey	·	1.6 km	MPC · JPL
643649	2006 KE_{94}	—	May 25, 2006	Kitt Peak	Spacewatch	·	1.7 km	MPC · JPL
643650	2006 KE_{98}	—	July 25, 1995	Kitt Peak	Spacewatch	·	1.2 km	MPC · JPL
643651	2006 KN_{98}	—	May 22, 2006	Kitt Peak	Spacewatch	·	560 m	MPC · JPL
643652	2006 KP_{102}	—	May 27, 2006	Kitt Peak	Spacewatch	·	1.8 km	MPC · JPL
643653	2006 KY_{105}	—	May 31, 2006	Mount Lemmon	Mount Lemmon Survey	·	1.4 km	MPC · JPL
643654	2006 KD_{111}	—	April 2, 2006	Mount Lemmon	Mount Lemmon Survey	·	1.4 km	MPC · JPL
643655	2006 KP_{115}	—	May 29, 2006	Kitt Peak	Spacewatch	·	1.4 km	MPC · JPL
643656	2006 KG_{116}	—	April 8, 2002	Palomar	NEAT	·	1.1 km	MPC · JPL
643657	2006 KD_{117}	—	May 29, 2006	Kitt Peak	Spacewatch	·	2.1 km	MPC · JPL
643658	2006 KT_{118}	—	May 30, 2006	Kitt Peak	Spacewatch	H	450 m	MPC · JPL
643659	2006 KH_{132}	—	May 25, 2006	Mauna Kea	P. A. Wiegert	KOR	1.0 km	MPC · JPL
643660	2006 KN_{135}	—	May 25, 2006	Mauna Kea	P. A. Wiegert	·	1.6 km	MPC · JPL
643661	2006 KB_{137}	—	May 25, 2006	Mauna Kea	P. A. Wiegert	·	930 m	MPC · JPL
643662	2006 KT_{146}	—	March 5, 2013	Haleakala	Pan-STARRS 1	·	990 m	MPC · JPL
643663	2006 KB_{147}	—	October 16, 2012	Mount Lemmon	Mount Lemmon Survey	·	1.8 km	MPC · JPL
643664	2006 KJ_{147}	—	September 5, 2013	Catalina	CSS	·	590 m	MPC · JPL
643665	2006 KT_{147}	—	January 17, 2013	Mount Lemmon	Mount Lemmon Survey	MAS	530 m	MPC · JPL
643666	2006 KY_{151}	—	April 4, 2016	Haleakala	Pan-STARRS 1	·	1.3 km	MPC · JPL
643667	2006 KL_{152}	—	April 12, 2016	Haleakala	Pan-STARRS 1	·	1.5 km	MPC · JPL
643668	2006 KK_{153}	—	March 8, 2017	Mount Lemmon	Mount Lemmon Survey	·	1.0 km	MPC · JPL
643669	2006 KQ_{154}	—	May 21, 2006	Kitt Peak	Spacewatch	·	1.1 km	MPC · JPL
643670	2006 LF_{8}	—	October 3, 2013	Kitt Peak	Spacewatch	·	540 m	MPC · JPL
643671	2006 MR_{14}	—	June 27, 2006	Siding Spring	SSS	·	1.8 km	MPC · JPL
643672	2006 NG	—	July 3, 2006	Hibiscus	Teamo, N., S. F. Hönig	·	1.1 km	MPC · JPL
643673	2006 OF_{6}	—	July 21, 2006	Mount Lemmon	Mount Lemmon Survey	·	510 m	MPC · JPL
643674	2006 OZ_{13}	—	July 20, 2006	Lulin	LUSS	(194)	1.1 km	MPC · JPL
643675	2006 OD_{19}	—	July 20, 2006	Siding Spring	SSS	(194)	1.3 km	MPC · JPL
643676	2006 OM_{23}	—	December 31, 2008	Kitt Peak	Spacewatch	EOS	1.4 km	MPC · JPL
643677	2006 OM_{29}	—	February 9, 2008	Kitt Peak	Spacewatch	·	550 m	MPC · JPL
643678	2006 OH_{32}	—	July 19, 2006	Mauna Kea	P. A. Wiegert, D. Subasinghe	·	1.9 km	MPC · JPL
643679	2006 OC_{35}	—	October 10, 2007	Kitt Peak	Spacewatch	·	1.4 km	MPC · JPL
643680	2006 OL_{38}	—	July 21, 2006	Mount Lemmon	Mount Lemmon Survey	·	2.4 km	MPC · JPL
643681	2006 OZ_{38}	—	September 11, 2015	Haleakala	Pan-STARRS 1	·	1.2 km	MPC · JPL
643682	2006 OP_{39}	—	May 9, 2018	Kitt Peak	Spacewatch	·	1.4 km	MPC · JPL
643683	2006 OF_{40}	—	July 29, 2006	Siding Spring	SSS	·	520 m	MPC · JPL
643684	2006 PZ_{3}	—	August 16, 2006	Siding Spring	SSS	·	940 m	MPC · JPL
643685	2006 PP_{20}	—	July 21, 2006	Lulin	LUSS	·	2.7 km	MPC · JPL
643686	2006 PN_{21}	—	August 15, 2006	Palomar	NEAT	NYS	920 m	MPC · JPL
643687	2006 PO_{28}	—	July 29, 2006	Siding Spring	SSS	·	1.5 km	MPC · JPL
643688	2006 PS_{29}	—	July 25, 2006	Palomar	NEAT	·	730 m	MPC · JPL
643689	2006 PB_{33}	—	August 12, 2006	Palomar	NEAT	·	490 m	MPC · JPL
643690	2006 PR_{33}	—	August 14, 2006	Siding Spring	SSS	·	570 m	MPC · JPL
643691	2006 PO_{34}	—	August 15, 2006	Palomar	NEAT	·	690 m	MPC · JPL
643692	2006 PY_{36}	—	February 1, 2005	Kitt Peak	Spacewatch	·	1.1 km	MPC · JPL
643693	2006 PP_{38}	—	August 15, 2006	Palomar	NEAT	·	3.2 km	MPC · JPL
643694	2006 PX_{43}	—	August 13, 2006	Palomar	NEAT	TIR	3.2 km	MPC · JPL
643695	2006 PG_{44}	—	August 26, 2006	Siding Spring	SSS	T_{j} (2.98)	3.7 km	MPC · JPL
643696	2006 PM_{44}	—	August 14, 2006	La Silla	Vuissoz, C.	EUN	1.1 km	MPC · JPL
643697	2006 PO_{44}	—	August 12, 2006	Palomar	NEAT	(5)	1.1 km	MPC · JPL
643698	2006 QT_{1}	—	August 17, 2006	Palomar	NEAT	·	850 m	MPC · JPL
643699	2006 QC_{2}	—	August 17, 2006	Palomar	NEAT	·	1.2 km	MPC · JPL
643700	2006 QY_{2}	—	August 17, 2006	Palomar	NEAT	·	2.9 km	MPC · JPL

== 643701–643800 ==
back to top

Designation			Discovery			Properties		Ref
Permanent	Provisional	Named after	Date	Site	Discoverer(s)	Category	Diam.	Ref
643701	2006 QF_{4}	—	August 18, 2006	Kitt Peak	Spacewatch	·	1.9 km	MPC · JPL
643702	2006 QY_{4}	—	August 18, 2006	Kitt Peak	Spacewatch	T_{j} (2.96)	2.9 km	MPC · JPL
643703	2006 QC_{6}	—	August 19, 2006	Pla D'Arguines	R. Ferrando, Ferrando, M.	·	580 m	MPC · JPL
643704	2006 QD_{6}	—	August 20, 2006	Pla D'Arguines	R. Ferrando, Ferrando, M.	·	1.1 km	MPC · JPL
643705	2006 QG_{6}	—	August 18, 2006	Socorro	LINEAR	H	570 m	MPC · JPL
643706	2006 QY_{11}	—	August 16, 2006	Siding Spring	SSS	·	1.4 km	MPC · JPL
643707	2006 QW_{16}	—	August 17, 2006	Palomar	NEAT	BRG	1.1 km	MPC · JPL
643708	2006 QH_{18}	—	August 16, 2006	Siding Spring	SSS	·	1.3 km	MPC · JPL
643709	2006 QN_{23}	—	August 21, 2006	Kitt Peak	Spacewatch	·	820 m	MPC · JPL
643710	2006 QA_{25}	—	August 18, 2006	Anderson Mesa	LONEOS	·	660 m	MPC · JPL
643711	2006 QW_{30}	—	August 22, 2006	Palomar	NEAT	·	1.1 km	MPC · JPL
643712	2006 QW_{41}	—	November 18, 2003	Kitt Peak	Spacewatch	·	900 m	MPC · JPL
643713	2006 QZ_{44}	—	August 19, 2006	Kitt Peak	Spacewatch	·	680 m	MPC · JPL
643714	2006 QZ_{56}	—	August 19, 2006	Kitt Peak	Spacewatch	H	480 m	MPC · JPL
643715	2006 QF_{69}	—	August 21, 2006	Kitt Peak	Spacewatch	·	1.8 km	MPC · JPL
643716	2006 QZ_{69}	—	August 21, 2006	Kitt Peak	Spacewatch	·	580 m	MPC · JPL
643717	2006 QK_{74}	—	August 21, 2006	Kitt Peak	Spacewatch	·	1.8 km	MPC · JPL
643718	2006 QB_{76}	—	August 21, 2006	Kitt Peak	Spacewatch	·	2.0 km	MPC · JPL
643719	2006 QK_{81}	—	August 24, 2006	Palomar	NEAT	PHO	1.1 km	MPC · JPL
643720	2006 QA_{83}	—	August 19, 2006	Kitt Peak	Spacewatch	·	3.0 km	MPC · JPL
643721	2006 QQ_{95}	—	August 21, 2006	Palomar	NEAT	·	760 m	MPC · JPL
643722	2006 QV_{101}	—	August 27, 2006	Kitt Peak	Spacewatch	·	500 m	MPC · JPL
643723	2006 QD_{103}	—	August 27, 2006	Kitt Peak	Spacewatch	KOR	1.3 km	MPC · JPL
643724	2006 QL_{108}	—	August 20, 2006	Kitt Peak	Spacewatch	·	1.1 km	MPC · JPL
643725	2006 QG_{111}	—	August 28, 2006	Lulin	LUSS	·	740 m	MPC · JPL
643726	2006 QM_{115}	—	August 27, 2006	Anderson Mesa	LONEOS	·	940 m	MPC · JPL
643727	2006 QT_{115}	—	August 15, 2006	Palomar	NEAT	·	790 m	MPC · JPL
643728	2006 QR_{118}	—	August 29, 2006	Catalina	CSS	THB	3.0 km	MPC · JPL
643729	2006 QB_{122}	—	July 19, 2006	Roeser	Dawson, M., Buttini, E.	·	670 m	MPC · JPL
643730	2006 QJ_{122}	—	July 21, 2006	Lulin	LUSS	·	2.7 km	MPC · JPL
643731	2006 QW_{129}	—	August 19, 2006	Palomar	NEAT	·	600 m	MPC · JPL
643732	2006 QZ_{129}	—	August 19, 2006	Palomar	NEAT	·	2.1 km	MPC · JPL
643733	2006 QZ_{131}	—	August 22, 2006	Palomar	NEAT	·	580 m	MPC · JPL
643734	2006 QG_{132}	—	August 22, 2006	Palomar	NEAT	·	1.6 km	MPC · JPL
643735	2006 QF_{133}	—	August 23, 2006	Palomar	NEAT	·	2.8 km	MPC · JPL
643736	2006 QW_{136}	—	August 19, 2006	Anderson Mesa	LONEOS	·	630 m	MPC · JPL
643737	2006 QP_{138}	—	August 16, 2006	Palomar	NEAT	·	1.8 km	MPC · JPL
643738	2006 QV_{138}	—	August 16, 2006	Lulin	LUSS	MAR	1.0 km	MPC · JPL
643739	2006 QY_{140}	—	August 23, 2006	Palomar	NEAT	EOS	2.1 km	MPC · JPL
643740	2006 QM_{141}	—	August 19, 2006	Palomar	NEAT	T_{j} (2.96)	4.3 km	MPC · JPL
643741	2006 QB_{142}	—	August 21, 2006	Kitt Peak	Spacewatch	·	2.2 km	MPC · JPL
643742	2006 QE_{143}	—	August 31, 2006	Mauna Kea	Veillet, C.	·	2.0 km	MPC · JPL
643743	2006 QJ_{144}	—	August 31, 2006	Ottmarsheim	C. Rinner	·	1.4 km	MPC · JPL
643744	2006 QE_{145}	—	August 18, 2006	Kitt Peak	Spacewatch	·	1.1 km	MPC · JPL
643745	2006 QL_{146}	—	August 18, 2006	Kitt Peak	Spacewatch	EOS	1.3 km	MPC · JPL
643746	2006 QL_{150}	—	August 19, 2006	Kitt Peak	Spacewatch	EOS	1.9 km	MPC · JPL
643747	2006 QO_{152}	—	August 19, 2006	Kitt Peak	Spacewatch	·	1.6 km	MPC · JPL
643748	2006 QV_{158}	—	August 19, 2006	Kitt Peak	Spacewatch	·	1.7 km	MPC · JPL
643749	2006 QT_{159}	—	August 19, 2006	Kitt Peak	Spacewatch	·	1.6 km	MPC · JPL
643750	2006 QC_{160}	—	August 19, 2006	Kitt Peak	Spacewatch	·	2.0 km	MPC · JPL
643751	2006 QF_{162}	—	August 21, 2006	Kitt Peak	Spacewatch	·	540 m	MPC · JPL
643752	2006 QE_{182}	—	September 15, 2006	Kitt Peak	Spacewatch	THM	1.7 km	MPC · JPL
643753	2006 QU_{189}	—	August 28, 2006	Catalina	CSS	·	560 m	MPC · JPL
643754	2006 QV_{189}	—	January 18, 2009	Mount Lemmon	Mount Lemmon Survey	EOS	1.9 km	MPC · JPL
643755	2006 QE_{190}	—	August 29, 2006	Kitt Peak	Spacewatch	·	1.9 km	MPC · JPL
643756	2006 QS_{190}	—	August 18, 2006	Kitt Peak	Spacewatch	·	2.2 km	MPC · JPL
643757	2006 QT_{190}	—	August 29, 2006	Kitt Peak	Spacewatch	·	2.2 km	MPC · JPL
643758	2006 QX_{190}	—	August 29, 2006	Kitt Peak	Spacewatch	LIX	2.2 km	MPC · JPL
643759	2006 QD_{191}	—	February 23, 2012	Catalina	CSS	·	940 m	MPC · JPL
643760	2006 QM_{191}	—	August 28, 2006	Kitt Peak	Spacewatch	·	2.1 km	MPC · JPL
643761	2006 QB_{192}	—	February 16, 2015	Haleakala	Pan-STARRS 1	·	2.1 km	MPC · JPL
643762	2006 QO_{193}	—	October 8, 2012	Haleakala	Pan-STARRS 1	·	1.8 km	MPC · JPL
643763	2006 QS_{193}	—	February 24, 2015	Haleakala	Pan-STARRS 1	·	2.2 km	MPC · JPL
643764	2006 QW_{194}	—	January 4, 2012	Kitt Peak	Spacewatch	EUN	1.0 km	MPC · JPL
643765	2006 QO_{195}	—	September 19, 1996	Kitt Peak	Spacewatch	·	480 m	MPC · JPL
643766	2006 QV_{195}	—	April 19, 2018	Mount Lemmon	Mount Lemmon Survey	·	1.1 km	MPC · JPL
643767	2006 QK_{196}	—	September 21, 2017	Haleakala	Pan-STARRS 1	EOS	1.2 km	MPC · JPL
643768	2006 QV_{196}	—	August 28, 2006	Kitt Peak	Spacewatch	·	1.5 km	MPC · JPL
643769	2006 QX_{196}	—	December 8, 2015	Haleakala	Pan-STARRS 1	·	1.2 km	MPC · JPL
643770	2006 QD_{197}	—	October 19, 2012	Mount Lemmon	Mount Lemmon Survey	·	2.4 km	MPC · JPL
643771	2006 QE_{197}	—	January 9, 2014	Mount Lemmon	Mount Lemmon Survey	·	2.2 km	MPC · JPL
643772	2006 QH_{198}	—	November 7, 2012	Haleakala	Pan-STARRS 1	·	1.6 km	MPC · JPL
643773	2006 QP_{198}	—	August 3, 2016	Haleakala	Pan-STARRS 1	·	1.7 km	MPC · JPL
643774	2006 QD_{199}	—	February 16, 2015	Haleakala	Pan-STARRS 1	·	520 m	MPC · JPL
643775	2006 QO_{200}	—	August 3, 2016	Haleakala	Pan-STARRS 1	EOS	1.5 km	MPC · JPL
643776	2006 QQ_{200}	—	January 14, 2011	Mount Lemmon	Mount Lemmon Survey	·	540 m	MPC · JPL
643777	2006 QT_{200}	—	June 18, 2010	Mount Lemmon	Mount Lemmon Survey	·	1.0 km	MPC · JPL
643778	2006 QK_{203}	—	August 29, 2006	Kitt Peak	Spacewatch	·	1.9 km	MPC · JPL
643779	2006 QX_{203}	—	August 27, 2006	Kitt Peak	Spacewatch	·	470 m	MPC · JPL
643780	2006 QK_{206}	—	August 29, 2006	Kitt Peak	Spacewatch	·	1.6 km	MPC · JPL
643781	2006 QC_{207}	—	August 28, 2006	Kitt Peak	Spacewatch	·	1.1 km	MPC · JPL
643782	2006 QE_{208}	—	August 21, 2006	Kitt Peak	Spacewatch	·	490 m	MPC · JPL
643783	2006 QJ_{208}	—	August 29, 2006	Kitt Peak	Spacewatch	·	950 m	MPC · JPL
643784	2006 QR_{208}	—	August 21, 2006	Kitt Peak	Spacewatch	·	460 m	MPC · JPL
643785	2006 QD_{210}	—	August 28, 2006	Kitt Peak	Spacewatch	·	820 m	MPC · JPL
643786	2006 RR	—	September 3, 2006	Wrightwood	J. W. Young	·	1.5 km	MPC · JPL
643787	2006 RW	—	September 4, 2006	Wrightwood	J. W. Young	·	540 m	MPC · JPL
643788	2006 RE_{8}	—	September 12, 2006	Catalina	CSS	·	2.5 km	MPC · JPL
643789	2006 RV_{8}	—	September 12, 2006	Catalina	CSS	·	1.4 km	MPC · JPL
643790	2006 RK_{13}	—	September 14, 2006	Kitt Peak	Spacewatch	·	2.1 km	MPC · JPL
643791	2006 RC_{15}	—	September 14, 2006	Kitt Peak	Spacewatch	EOS	1.5 km	MPC · JPL
643792	2006 RH_{16}	—	September 14, 2006	Palomar	NEAT	·	1.9 km	MPC · JPL
643793	2006 RY_{22}	—	August 29, 2006	Catalina	CSS	·	2.1 km	MPC · JPL
643794	2006 RD_{23}	—	August 28, 2006	Catalina	CSS	·	4.2 km	MPC · JPL
643795	2006 RQ_{25}	—	August 29, 2006	Kitt Peak	Spacewatch	·	830 m	MPC · JPL
643796	2006 RU_{27}	—	August 16, 2006	Palomar	NEAT	·	2.8 km	MPC · JPL
643797	2006 RV_{28}	—	September 15, 2006	Kitt Peak	Spacewatch	·	670 m	MPC · JPL
643798	2006 RF_{33}	—	September 15, 2006	Palomar	NEAT	T_{j} (2.92)	2.8 km	MPC · JPL
643799	2006 RQ_{33}	—	August 10, 2006	Palomar	NEAT	TIN	1.2 km	MPC · JPL
643800	2006 RK_{34}	—	September 12, 2006	Catalina	CSS	·	740 m	MPC · JPL

== 643801–643900 ==
back to top

Designation			Discovery			Properties		Ref
Permanent	Provisional	Named after	Date	Site	Discoverer(s)	Category	Diam.	Ref
643801	2006 RE_{38}	—	August 28, 2002	Palomar	NEAT	·	1.1 km	MPC · JPL
643802	2006 RK_{39}	—	September 14, 2006	Catalina	CSS	·	500 m	MPC · JPL
643803	2006 RR_{40}	—	September 14, 2006	Kitt Peak	Spacewatch	·	2.1 km	MPC · JPL
643804	2006 RK_{47}	—	September 14, 2006	Kitt Peak	Spacewatch	·	970 m	MPC · JPL
643805	2006 RP_{52}	—	September 14, 2006	Kitt Peak	Spacewatch	THM	1.8 km	MPC · JPL
643806	2006 RD_{60}	—	September 15, 2006	Kitt Peak	Spacewatch	EUN	1.4 km	MPC · JPL
643807	2006 RL_{60}	—	September 15, 2006	Kitt Peak	Spacewatch	·	2.2 km	MPC · JPL
643808	2006 RU_{61}	—	September 12, 2006	Catalina	CSS	·	500 m	MPC · JPL
643809	2006 RY_{65}	—	September 14, 2006	Kitt Peak	Spacewatch	·	1.0 km	MPC · JPL
643810	2006 RE_{70}	—	September 15, 2006	Kitt Peak	Spacewatch	·	920 m	MPC · JPL
643811	2006 RL_{70}	—	September 15, 2006	Kitt Peak	Spacewatch	·	1.9 km	MPC · JPL
643812	2006 RX_{71}	—	September 15, 2006	Kitt Peak	Spacewatch	·	2.3 km	MPC · JPL
643813	2006 RD_{75}	—	September 15, 2006	Kitt Peak	Spacewatch	T_{j} (2.98) · 3:2	4.8 km	MPC · JPL
643814	2006 RC_{76}	—	September 15, 2006	Kitt Peak	Spacewatch	·	2.2 km	MPC · JPL
643815	2006 RQ_{78}	—	September 15, 2006	Kitt Peak	Spacewatch	·	1.8 km	MPC · JPL
643816	2006 RJ_{79}	—	September 15, 2006	Kitt Peak	Spacewatch	·	540 m	MPC · JPL
643817	2006 RW_{81}	—	September 15, 2006	Kitt Peak	Spacewatch	·	960 m	MPC · JPL
643818	2006 RX_{87}	—	September 15, 2006	Kitt Peak	Spacewatch	·	1.2 km	MPC · JPL
643819	2006 RA_{95}	—	September 15, 2006	Kitt Peak	Spacewatch	·	2.4 km	MPC · JPL
643820	2006 RN_{99}	—	August 27, 2006	Anderson Mesa	LONEOS	·	1.3 km	MPC · JPL
643821	2006 RQ_{102}	—	September 14, 2006	Catalina	CSS	·	650 m	MPC · JPL
643822	2006 RS_{103}	—	September 11, 2006	Apache Point	SDSS Collaboration	·	2.2 km	MPC · JPL
643823	2006 RY_{103}	—	September 28, 2006	Kitt Peak	Spacewatch	·	2.2 km	MPC · JPL
643824	2006 RK_{104}	—	October 28, 2006	Catalina	CSS	·	2.7 km	MPC · JPL
643825	2006 RN_{104}	—	September 15, 2006	Apache Point	SDSS Collaboration	EOS	1.5 km	MPC · JPL
643826	2006 RP_{104}	—	September 15, 2006	Apache Point	SDSS Collaboration	·	2.5 km	MPC · JPL
643827	2006 RF_{106}	—	September 26, 2006	Kitt Peak	Spacewatch	·	900 m	MPC · JPL
643828	2006 RJ_{112}	—	September 14, 2006	Mauna Kea	Masiero, J., R. Jedicke	·	1.7 km	MPC · JPL
643829	2006 RB_{113}	—	September 14, 2006	Kitt Peak	Spacewatch	·	490 m	MPC · JPL
643830	2006 RD_{115}	—	September 14, 2006	Mauna Kea	Masiero, J., R. Jedicke	·	1.7 km	MPC · JPL
643831	2006 RE_{115}	—	September 25, 2006	Mount Lemmon	Mount Lemmon Survey	THM	1.6 km	MPC · JPL
643832	2006 RD_{118}	—	September 18, 2006	Kitt Peak	Spacewatch	·	2.0 km	MPC · JPL
643833	2006 RU_{118}	—	September 14, 2006	Mauna Kea	Masiero, J., R. Jedicke	·	960 m	MPC · JPL
643834	2006 RE_{119}	—	September 14, 2006	Mauna Kea	Masiero, J., R. Jedicke	·	390 m	MPC · JPL
643835	2006 RU_{119}	—	September 14, 2006	Mauna Kea	Masiero, J., R. Jedicke	·	950 m	MPC · JPL
643836	2006 RP_{121}	—	September 15, 2006	Kitt Peak	Spacewatch	·	2.2 km	MPC · JPL
643837	2006 RB_{123}	—	September 14, 2006	Catalina	CSS	·	1.3 km	MPC · JPL
643838	2006 RD_{123}	—	September 14, 2006	Catalina	CSS	·	2.2 km	MPC · JPL
643839	2006 RL_{123}	—	September 14, 2006	Palomar	NEAT	·	1.6 km	MPC · JPL
643840	2006 RW_{124}	—	September 15, 2006	Kitt Peak	Spacewatch	·	1.5 km	MPC · JPL
643841	2006 RP_{126}	—	September 14, 2006	Kitt Peak	Spacewatch	MAR	790 m	MPC · JPL
643842	2006 RS_{126}	—	September 15, 2006	Kitt Peak	Spacewatch	·	410 m	MPC · JPL
643843	2006 SJ	—	August 16, 2006	Palomar	NEAT	JUN	890 m	MPC · JPL
643844	2006 SQ_{1}	—	August 28, 2006	Kitt Peak	Spacewatch	T_{j} (2.95) · 3:2	4.9 km	MPC · JPL
643845	2006 SB_{3}	—	September 16, 2006	Catalina	CSS	·	1.5 km	MPC · JPL
643846	2006 SU_{6}	—	September 16, 2006	Vail-Jarnac	Jarnac	·	3.1 km	MPC · JPL
643847	2006 SG_{10}	—	September 16, 2006	Kitt Peak	Spacewatch	·	1.1 km	MPC · JPL
643848	2006 SM_{13}	—	August 28, 2006	Catalina	CSS	·	3.4 km	MPC · JPL
643849	2006 SY_{21}	—	September 17, 2006	Catalina	CSS	BRG	1.2 km	MPC · JPL
643850	2006 SC_{22}	—	August 28, 1995	Kitt Peak	Spacewatch	·	2.5 km	MPC · JPL
643851	2006 SA_{23}	—	August 30, 2006	Lulin	LUSS	·	620 m	MPC · JPL
643852	2006 SW_{28}	—	September 17, 2006	Kitt Peak	Spacewatch	·	480 m	MPC · JPL
643853	2006 SL_{36}	—	September 17, 2006	Anderson Mesa	LONEOS	·	660 m	MPC · JPL
643854	2006 SO_{39}	—	August 29, 2006	Kitt Peak	Spacewatch	·	500 m	MPC · JPL
643855	2006 SM_{40}	—	September 18, 2006	Catalina	CSS	H	500 m	MPC · JPL
643856	2006 SZ_{43}	—	August 17, 2006	Goodricke-Pigott	R. A. Tucker	·	2.9 km	MPC · JPL
643857	2006 SY_{44}	—	September 18, 2006	Kitt Peak	Spacewatch	PHO	670 m	MPC · JPL
643858	2006 SC_{47}	—	September 19, 2006	Catalina	CSS	·	680 m	MPC · JPL
643859	2006 SA_{61}	—	August 29, 2006	Lulin	LUSS	·	3.6 km	MPC · JPL
643860	2006 SA_{63}	—	September 18, 2006	Catalina	CSS	·	2.6 km	MPC · JPL
643861	2006 ST_{64}	—	September 14, 2006	Bergisch Gladbach	W. Bickel	·	2.3 km	MPC · JPL
643862	2006 SD_{69}	—	March 23, 2004	Kitt Peak	Spacewatch	EOS	1.7 km	MPC · JPL
643863	2006 SP_{70}	—	September 19, 2006	Kitt Peak	Spacewatch	·	540 m	MPC · JPL
643864	2006 SD_{78}	—	September 21, 2006	Bergisch Gladbach	W. Bickel	EOS	1.6 km	MPC · JPL
643865	2006 SV_{78}	—	September 16, 2006	Catalina	CSS	·	1.7 km	MPC · JPL
643866	2006 SV_{80}	—	September 18, 2006	Kitt Peak	Spacewatch	·	1.4 km	MPC · JPL
643867	2006 SW_{80}	—	September 18, 2006	Kitt Peak	Spacewatch	·	2.6 km	MPC · JPL
643868	2006 SY_{80}	—	September 18, 2006	Kitt Peak	Spacewatch	·	990 m	MPC · JPL
643869	2006 SG_{81}	—	September 18, 2006	Kitt Peak	Spacewatch	·	2.2 km	MPC · JPL
643870	2006 SQ_{82}	—	September 18, 2006	Kitt Peak	Spacewatch	·	2.8 km	MPC · JPL
643871	2006 SR_{84}	—	September 18, 2006	Kitt Peak	Spacewatch	·	1.6 km	MPC · JPL
643872	2006 SU_{86}	—	September 18, 2006	Kitt Peak	Spacewatch	THM	1.7 km	MPC · JPL
643873	2006 SZ_{86}	—	September 18, 2006	Kitt Peak	Spacewatch	THM	1.9 km	MPC · JPL
643874	2006 SV_{88}	—	September 18, 2006	Kitt Peak	Spacewatch	·	540 m	MPC · JPL
643875	2006 SN_{99}	—	September 18, 2006	Kitt Peak	Spacewatch	·	1.1 km	MPC · JPL
643876	2006 SR_{100}	—	September 19, 2006	Kitt Peak	Spacewatch	·	1.8 km	MPC · JPL
643877	2006 SV_{100}	—	September 19, 2006	Kitt Peak	Spacewatch	THM	1.5 km	MPC · JPL
643878	2006 ST_{102}	—	September 19, 2006	Kitt Peak	Spacewatch	HYG	2.3 km	MPC · JPL
643879	2006 SK_{107}	—	September 19, 2006	Catalina	CSS	T_{j} (2.98)	3.0 km	MPC · JPL
643880	2006 SX_{109}	—	September 20, 2006	Kitt Peak	Spacewatch	·	1.9 km	MPC · JPL
643881	2006 SH_{111}	—	September 22, 2006	Kitt Peak	Spacewatch	·	2.4 km	MPC · JPL
643882	2006 SH_{112}	—	September 12, 2006	Catalina	CSS	·	2.8 km	MPC · JPL
643883	2006 SV_{112}	—	September 15, 2006	Kitt Peak	Spacewatch	·	2.5 km	MPC · JPL
643884	2006 SY_{112}	—	September 15, 2006	Kitt Peak	Spacewatch	KOR	1.3 km	MPC · JPL
643885	2006 SM_{114}	—	September 19, 2006	Catalina	CSS	TIR	2.1 km	MPC · JPL
643886	2006 SA_{117}	—	September 24, 2006	Kitt Peak	Spacewatch	·	2.2 km	MPC · JPL
643887	2006 SJ_{117}	—	September 18, 2006	Kitt Peak	Spacewatch	·	810 m	MPC · JPL
643888	2006 SK_{117}	—	September 24, 2006	Kitt Peak	Spacewatch	EUN	930 m	MPC · JPL
643889	2006 SA_{122}	—	August 27, 2006	Kitt Peak	Spacewatch	·	1.2 km	MPC · JPL
643890	2006 SB_{129}	—	September 17, 2006	Catalina	CSS	JUN	980 m	MPC · JPL
643891	2006 SD_{130}	—	September 19, 2006	Anderson Mesa	LONEOS	·	460 m	MPC · JPL
643892	2006 SM_{133}	—	September 17, 2006	Catalina	CSS	·	570 m	MPC · JPL
643893	2006 SV_{139}	—	September 22, 2006	Anderson Mesa	LONEOS	·	990 m	MPC · JPL
643894	2006 SQ_{140}	—	September 22, 2006	Catalina	CSS	TIR	2.8 km	MPC · JPL
643895	2006 SF_{143}	—	September 19, 2006	Kitt Peak	Spacewatch	MAR	730 m	MPC · JPL
643896	2006 SP_{148}	—	September 19, 2006	Kitt Peak	Spacewatch	·	2.7 km	MPC · JPL
643897	2006 SB_{149}	—	September 19, 2006	Kitt Peak	Spacewatch	EUN	1.1 km	MPC · JPL
643898	2006 SZ_{153}	—	July 30, 2006	Siding Spring	SSS	·	1.6 km	MPC · JPL
643899	2006 SA_{155}	—	September 22, 2006	Kitt Peak	Spacewatch	·	1.6 km	MPC · JPL
643900	2006 SU_{161}	—	September 24, 2006	Kitt Peak	Spacewatch	·	1.0 km	MPC · JPL

== 643901–644000 ==
back to top

Designation			Discovery			Properties		Ref
Permanent	Provisional	Named after	Date	Site	Discoverer(s)	Category	Diam.	Ref
643901	2006 SR_{162}	—	September 24, 2006	Kitt Peak	Spacewatch	·	2.7 km	MPC · JPL
643902	2006 SK_{164}	—	August 29, 2006	Kitt Peak	Spacewatch	·	870 m	MPC · JPL
643903	2006 SD_{166}	—	September 25, 2006	Kitt Peak	Spacewatch	·	2.0 km	MPC · JPL
643904	2006 SP_{166}	—	September 17, 2006	Catalina	CSS	·	2.3 km	MPC · JPL
643905	2006 SF_{170}	—	September 17, 2006	Kitt Peak	Spacewatch	·	520 m	MPC · JPL
643906	2006 SN_{173}	—	September 25, 2006	Kitt Peak	Spacewatch	·	2.1 km	MPC · JPL
643907	2006 SD_{174}	—	August 27, 2006	Kitt Peak	Spacewatch	·	480 m	MPC · JPL
643908	2006 SR_{174}	—	September 25, 2006	Mount Lemmon	Mount Lemmon Survey	·	1.6 km	MPC · JPL
643909	2006 SZ_{174}	—	September 17, 2006	Kitt Peak	Spacewatch	·	2.1 km	MPC · JPL
643910	2006 SW_{177}	—	September 14, 2006	Kitt Peak	Spacewatch	·	1.4 km	MPC · JPL
643911	2006 SK_{178}	—	September 16, 2006	Kitt Peak	Spacewatch	·	2.2 km	MPC · JPL
643912	2006 SC_{181}	—	September 15, 2006	Kitt Peak	Spacewatch	·	2.0 km	MPC · JPL
643913	2006 SZ_{182}	—	September 14, 2006	Kitt Peak	Spacewatch	·	510 m	MPC · JPL
643914	2006 SY_{184}	—	September 25, 2006	Mount Lemmon	Mount Lemmon Survey	THM	1.9 km	MPC · JPL
643915	2006 SX_{188}	—	September 14, 2006	Catalina	CSS	·	1.1 km	MPC · JPL
643916	2006 SK_{191}	—	September 26, 2006	Mount Lemmon	Mount Lemmon Survey	·	930 m	MPC · JPL
643917	2006 SV_{192}	—	September 26, 2006	Mount Lemmon	Mount Lemmon Survey	·	1.4 km	MPC · JPL
643918	2006 SU_{193}	—	September 26, 2006	Mount Lemmon	Mount Lemmon Survey	·	2.2 km	MPC · JPL
643919	2006 SB_{194}	—	September 19, 2006	Kitt Peak	Spacewatch	·	2.2 km	MPC · JPL
643920	2006 SD_{194}	—	September 17, 2006	Kitt Peak	Spacewatch	·	2.5 km	MPC · JPL
643921	2006 SG_{197}	—	September 24, 2006	Kitt Peak	Spacewatch	·	550 m	MPC · JPL
643922	2006 SL_{202}	—	September 17, 2006	Kitt Peak	Spacewatch	T_{j} (2.98) · 3:2	4.0 km	MPC · JPL
643923	2006 SZ_{203}	—	September 25, 2006	Kitt Peak	Spacewatch	·	810 m	MPC · JPL
643924	2006 SC_{204}	—	September 25, 2006	Kitt Peak	Spacewatch	·	1.1 km	MPC · JPL
643925	2006 SM_{205}	—	September 15, 2006	Kitt Peak	Spacewatch	THM	1.7 km	MPC · JPL
643926	2006 SR_{206}	—	September 25, 2006	Mount Lemmon	Mount Lemmon Survey	·	2.2 km	MPC · JPL
643927	2006 SS_{207}	—	September 25, 2006	Kitt Peak	Spacewatch	·	2.5 km	MPC · JPL
643928	2006 SM_{216}	—	September 17, 2006	Kitt Peak	Spacewatch	·	620 m	MPC · JPL
643929	2006 SC_{221}	—	August 27, 2006	Kitt Peak	Spacewatch	·	820 m	MPC · JPL
643930	2006 SP_{224}	—	August 28, 2006	Kitt Peak	Spacewatch	·	2.1 km	MPC · JPL
643931	2006 SQ_{227}	—	September 26, 2006	Kitt Peak	Spacewatch	EOS	1.5 km	MPC · JPL
643932	2006 SW_{228}	—	September 26, 2006	Kitt Peak	Spacewatch	·	2.0 km	MPC · JPL
643933	2006 SQ_{236}	—	September 26, 2006	Mount Lemmon	Mount Lemmon Survey	·	560 m	MPC · JPL
643934	2006 ST_{237}	—	September 26, 2006	Kitt Peak	Spacewatch	·	2.0 km	MPC · JPL
643935	2006 SE_{239}	—	September 26, 2006	Kitt Peak	Spacewatch	·	780 m	MPC · JPL
643936	2006 SH_{241}	—	September 26, 2006	Kitt Peak	Spacewatch	·	1.9 km	MPC · JPL
643937	2006 SZ_{242}	—	September 26, 2006	Kitt Peak	Spacewatch	·	520 m	MPC · JPL
643938	2006 SE_{243}	—	September 26, 2006	Kitt Peak	Spacewatch	·	1.0 km	MPC · JPL
643939	2006 SK_{244}	—	September 26, 2006	Kitt Peak	Spacewatch	·	2.1 km	MPC · JPL
643940	2006 SH_{245}	—	September 26, 2006	Kitt Peak	Spacewatch	THM	1.7 km	MPC · JPL
643941	2006 SS_{245}	—	September 16, 2006	Anderson Mesa	LONEOS	·	2.7 km	MPC · JPL
643942	2006 SE_{247}	—	September 15, 2006	Kitt Peak	Spacewatch	·	1.2 km	MPC · JPL
643943	2006 SZ_{247}	—	September 15, 2006	Kitt Peak	Spacewatch	·	1.5 km	MPC · JPL
643944	2006 SA_{249}	—	September 19, 2006	Kitt Peak	Spacewatch	·	1.1 km	MPC · JPL
643945	2006 SC_{249}	—	September 26, 2006	Kitt Peak	Spacewatch	·	2.5 km	MPC · JPL
643946	2006 SO_{251}	—	September 26, 2006	Mount Lemmon	Mount Lemmon Survey	·	2.0 km	MPC · JPL
643947	2006 SL_{252}	—	September 17, 2006	Kitt Peak	Spacewatch	·	700 m	MPC · JPL
643948	2006 SX_{254}	—	September 26, 2006	Mount Lemmon	Mount Lemmon Survey	·	2.2 km	MPC · JPL
643949	2006 SM_{255}	—	August 21, 2006	Kitt Peak	Spacewatch	·	880 m	MPC · JPL
643950	2006 SD_{257}	—	September 26, 2006	Kitt Peak	Spacewatch	·	1.8 km	MPC · JPL
643951	2006 SY_{257}	—	September 26, 2006	Kitt Peak	Spacewatch	·	950 m	MPC · JPL
643952	2006 SY_{258}	—	September 26, 2006	Kitt Peak	Spacewatch	·	1.7 km	MPC · JPL
643953	2006 SZ_{263}	—	September 26, 2006	Kitt Peak	Spacewatch	EOS	1.8 km	MPC · JPL
643954	2006 SP_{264}	—	September 26, 2006	Kitt Peak	Spacewatch	·	2.5 km	MPC · JPL
643955	2006 SM_{265}	—	September 26, 2006	Kitt Peak	Spacewatch	T_{j} (2.98) · 3:2	4.5 km	MPC · JPL
643956	2006 SY_{267}	—	March 15, 2004	Kitt Peak	Spacewatch	·	1.5 km	MPC · JPL
643957	2006 SA_{268}	—	September 26, 2006	Kitt Peak	Spacewatch	·	690 m	MPC · JPL
643958	2006 SK_{270}	—	August 29, 2006	Catalina	CSS	·	1.0 km	MPC · JPL
643959	2006 SQ_{270}	—	August 29, 2006	Kitt Peak	Spacewatch	·	2.4 km	MPC · JPL
643960	2006 SF_{271}	—	September 18, 2006	Catalina	CSS	·	1.3 km	MPC · JPL
643961	2006 ST_{271}	—	September 27, 2006	Mount Lemmon	Mount Lemmon Survey	·	3.1 km	MPC · JPL
643962	2006 SH_{278}	—	September 20, 2006	Kitt Peak	Spacewatch	·	2.4 km	MPC · JPL
643963	2006 SR_{278}	—	September 26, 2006	Mount Lemmon	Mount Lemmon Survey	·	1.5 km	MPC · JPL
643964	2006 SU_{280}	—	September 29, 2006	Anderson Mesa	LONEOS	·	2.8 km	MPC · JPL
643965	2006 SJ_{283}	—	November 6, 2002	Anderson Mesa	LONEOS	·	1.3 km	MPC · JPL
643966	2006 SY_{285}	—	September 16, 2006	Catalina	CSS	·	2.3 km	MPC · JPL
643967	2006 SW_{286}	—	September 14, 2006	Catalina	CSS	·	1.0 km	MPC · JPL
643968	2006 SF_{287}	—	September 22, 2006	Anderson Mesa	LONEOS	EUN	1.0 km	MPC · JPL
643969	2006 SD_{288}	—	August 28, 2006	Kitt Peak	Spacewatch	·	730 m	MPC · JPL
643970	2006 SL_{288}	—	March 11, 2002	Palomar	NEAT	·	1.1 km	MPC · JPL
643971	2006 SC_{291}	—	September 16, 2006	Catalina	CSS	EUP	2.4 km	MPC · JPL
643972	2006 SF_{291}	—	September 16, 2006	Catalina	CSS	·	2.5 km	MPC · JPL
643973	2006 SU_{298}	—	September 16, 2006	Anderson Mesa	LONEOS	·	600 m	MPC · JPL
643974	2006 SV_{298}	—	September 26, 2006	Kitt Peak	Spacewatch	·	2.1 km	MPC · JPL
643975 Lanthimos	2006 SH_{299}	Lanthimos	September 19, 2006	Nogales	J.-C. Merlin	·	1.5 km	MPC · JPL
643976	2006 SF_{302}	—	September 27, 2006	Kitt Peak	Spacewatch	3:2	3.8 km	MPC · JPL
643977	2006 SB_{309}	—	September 17, 2006	Kitt Peak	Spacewatch	EUN	860 m	MPC · JPL
643978	2006 SX_{310}	—	September 19, 2006	Kitt Peak	Spacewatch	·	2.1 km	MPC · JPL
643979	2006 SX_{312}	—	September 27, 2006	Kitt Peak	Spacewatch	·	1.2 km	MPC · JPL
643980	2006 SA_{315}	—	September 17, 2006	Kitt Peak	Spacewatch	·	760 m	MPC · JPL
643981	2006 SA_{316}	—	September 27, 2006	Kitt Peak	Spacewatch	EUN	1.1 km	MPC · JPL
643982	2006 SN_{317}	—	September 17, 2006	Kitt Peak	Spacewatch	·	2.1 km	MPC · JPL
643983	2006 SR_{318}	—	September 17, 2006	Kitt Peak	Spacewatch	·	2.5 km	MPC · JPL
643984	2006 SJ_{322}	—	May 4, 2005	Kitt Peak	Spacewatch	·	1.2 km	MPC · JPL
643985	2006 SV_{322}	—	September 27, 2006	Kitt Peak	Spacewatch	·	1.3 km	MPC · JPL
643986	2006 SP_{323}	—	September 17, 2006	Kitt Peak	Spacewatch	·	1.6 km	MPC · JPL
643987	2006 SJ_{326}	—	November 1, 2002	La Palma	A. Fitzsimmons	(5)	940 m	MPC · JPL
643988	2006 SD_{327}	—	September 23, 2006	Kitt Peak	Spacewatch	·	1.8 km	MPC · JPL
643989	2006 SH_{330}	—	September 27, 2006	Kitt Peak	Spacewatch	·	920 m	MPC · JPL
643990	2006 SX_{332}	—	September 18, 2006	Kitt Peak	Spacewatch	·	2.1 km	MPC · JPL
643991	2006 SN_{336}	—	September 18, 2006	Kitt Peak	Spacewatch	·	490 m	MPC · JPL
643992	2006 SV_{337}	—	September 28, 2006	Kitt Peak	Spacewatch	·	2.7 km	MPC · JPL
643993	2006 SH_{340}	—	September 22, 2001	Kitt Peak	Spacewatch	EOS	2.2 km	MPC · JPL
643994	2006 SN_{340}	—	September 28, 2006	Kitt Peak	Spacewatch	·	600 m	MPC · JPL
643995	2006 SG_{345}	—	September 28, 2006	Kitt Peak	Spacewatch	·	2.1 km	MPC · JPL
643996	2006 SV_{345}	—	September 28, 2006	Kitt Peak	Spacewatch	·	1.2 km	MPC · JPL
643997	2006 SQ_{348}	—	September 19, 2006	Kitt Peak	Spacewatch	THM	1.9 km	MPC · JPL
643998	2006 SY_{349}	—	September 30, 2006	Kitt Peak	Spacewatch	·	1.6 km	MPC · JPL
643999	2006 SQ_{350}	—	September 27, 2006	Kitt Peak	Spacewatch	·	2.7 km	MPC · JPL
644000	2006 SH_{352}	—	September 20, 2006	Anderson Mesa	LONEOS	·	2.4 km	MPC · JPL

back to top

== Meaning of names ==
As minor planet discoveries are confirmed, they are given a permanent number by the IAU's Minor Planet Center (MPC), and the discoverers can then submit names for them, following the IAU's naming conventions. The list below concerns those minor planets in the specified number-range that have received names, and explains the meanings of those names.

Official naming citations of newly named small Solar System bodies are approved and published in a bulletin by IAU's Working Group for Small Bodies Nomenclature (WGSBN). Before May 2021, citations were published in MPC's Minor Planet Circulars for many decades. Recent citations can also be found on the JPL Small-Body Database (SBDB). Until his death in 2016, German astronomer Lutz D. Schmadel compiled these citations into the Dictionary of Minor Planet Names (DMP) and regularly updated the collection.

Based on Paul Herget's The Names of the Minor Planets, Schmadel also researched the unclear origin of numerous asteroids, most of which had been named prior to World War II. This article incorporates text from this source, which is in the public domain: SBDB New namings may only be added to this list below after official publication as the preannouncement of names is condemned. The WGSBN publishes a comprehensive guideline for the naming rules of non-cometary small Solar System bodies.

Named minor planet	Provisional	This minor planet was named for...	Ref · Catalog
643975 Lanthimos	2006 SH_{299}	Yorgos Lanthimos, Greek filmmaker.	IAU · 643975
