= List of minor planets: 558001–559000 =

The following is a partial list of minor planets, running from minor-planet number 558001 through 559000, inclusive. The primary data for this and other partial lists is based on JPL's "Small-Body Orbital Elements" and data available from the Minor Planet Center. Critical list information is also provided by the MPC, unless otherwise specified from Lowell Observatory. A detailed description of the table's columns and additional sources are given on the main page including a complete list of every page in this series, and a statistical break-up on the dynamical classification of minor planets.

Also see the summary list of all named bodies in numerical and alphabetical order, and the corresponding naming citations for the number range of this particular list. New namings may only be added to this list after official publication, as the preannouncement of names is condemned by the Working Group for Small Bodies Nomenclature of the International Astronomical Union.

Near-Earth obj.	MBA (inner)	MBA (outer)	Centaur
Mars-crosser	MBA (middle)	Jupiter trojan	Trans-Neptunian obj.
Unclassified

== 558001–558100 ==
Designation			Discovery			Properties		Ref
Permanent	Provisional	Named after	Date	Site	Discoverer(s)	Category	Diam.	Ref
558001	2014 WY_{460}	—	January 14, 2011	Mount Lemmon	Mount Lemmon Survey	·	1.2 km	MPC · JPL
558002	2014 WM_{461}	—	April 8, 2006	Kitt Peak	Spacewatch	·	2.3 km	MPC · JPL
558003	2014 WY_{465}	—	November 27, 2014	Haleakala	Pan-STARRS 1	·	1.9 km	MPC · JPL
558004	2014 WU_{467}	—	July 11, 2010	WISE	WISE	LIX	3.1 km	MPC · JPL
558005	2014 WA_{468}	—	March 16, 2004	Kitt Peak	Spacewatch	·	3.1 km	MPC · JPL
558006	2014 WS_{469}	—	November 2, 2013	Catalina	CSS	·	3.3 km	MPC · JPL
558007	2014 WC_{470}	—	November 20, 2014	Kitt Peak	Spacewatch	·	2.0 km	MPC · JPL
558008	2014 WY_{470}	—	November 14, 2014	Kitt Peak	Spacewatch	·	1.1 km	MPC · JPL
558009	2014 WO_{471}	—	November 28, 2014	Mount Lemmon	Mount Lemmon Survey	L5	7.1 km	MPC · JPL
558010	2014 WT_{471}	—	January 14, 2011	Mount Lemmon	Mount Lemmon Survey	·	1.3 km	MPC · JPL
558011	2014 WC_{472}	—	January 28, 2006	Kitt Peak	Spacewatch	L5	9.1 km	MPC · JPL
558012	2014 WK_{472}	—	March 29, 2008	Kitt Peak	Spacewatch	L5	7.4 km	MPC · JPL
558013	2014 WG_{474}	—	December 14, 2010	Mount Lemmon	Mount Lemmon Survey	·	1.2 km	MPC · JPL
558014	2014 WT_{477}	—	October 5, 2013	Haleakala	Pan-STARRS 1	·	2.4 km	MPC · JPL
558015	2014 WV_{477}	—	November 25, 2011	Haleakala	Pan-STARRS 1	H	480 m	MPC · JPL
558016	2014 WO_{478}	—	October 23, 2013	Haleakala	Pan-STARRS 1	TIR	3.2 km	MPC · JPL
558017	2014 WD_{479}	—	October 28, 2013	Kitt Peak	Spacewatch	·	3.3 km	MPC · JPL
558018	2014 WF_{480}	—	October 7, 2013	Mount Lemmon	Mount Lemmon Survey	·	3.0 km	MPC · JPL
558019	2014 WR_{480}	—	September 1, 2002	Palomar	NEAT	·	1.7 km	MPC · JPL
558020	2014 WZ_{480}	—	October 14, 2004	Palomar	NEAT	·	2.8 km	MPC · JPL
558021	2014 WE_{481}	—	November 28, 2014	Haleakala	Pan-STARRS 1	H	470 m	MPC · JPL
558022	2014 WR_{481}	—	October 16, 2007	Mount Lemmon	Mount Lemmon Survey	EOS	2.2 km	MPC · JPL
558023	2014 WB_{482}	—	November 4, 2014	Mount Lemmon	Mount Lemmon Survey	EUN	1.0 km	MPC · JPL
558024	2014 WS_{483}	—	August 18, 2009	Kitt Peak	Spacewatch	·	1.4 km	MPC · JPL
558025	2014 WN_{485}	—	October 19, 1995	Kitt Peak	Spacewatch	·	2.1 km	MPC · JPL
558026	2014 WV_{485}	—	December 20, 2003	Socorro	LINEAR	·	3.5 km	MPC · JPL
558027	2014 WX_{485}	—	September 27, 2009	Mount Lemmon	Mount Lemmon Survey	·	1.8 km	MPC · JPL
558028	2014 WR_{489}	—	January 13, 2002	Kitt Peak	Spacewatch	·	1.6 km	MPC · JPL
558029	2014 WX_{490}	—	November 17, 2006	Mount Lemmon	Mount Lemmon Survey	H	400 m	MPC · JPL
558030	2014 WH_{491}	—	February 12, 2003	Haleakala	NEAT	·	1.6 km	MPC · JPL
558031	2014 WJ_{491}	—	September 12, 2005	Kitt Peak	Spacewatch	ADE	1.7 km	MPC · JPL
558032	2014 WP_{492}	—	November 26, 2014	Haleakala	Pan-STARRS 1	·	2.7 km	MPC · JPL
558033	2014 WM_{493}	—	August 25, 2012	Haleakala	Pan-STARRS 1	EOS	2.2 km	MPC · JPL
558034	2014 WC_{494}	—	November 30, 2008	Kitt Peak	Spacewatch	·	3.4 km	MPC · JPL
558035	2014 WQ_{495}	—	June 19, 2013	Haleakala	Pan-STARRS 1	H	510 m	MPC · JPL
558036	2014 WV_{495}	—	April 2, 2005	Kitt Peak	Spacewatch	·	2.9 km	MPC · JPL
558037	2014 WF_{496}	—	September 23, 2008	Kitt Peak	Spacewatch	·	1.7 km	MPC · JPL
558038	2014 WL_{496}	—	September 20, 2001	Socorro	LINEAR	·	3.4 km	MPC · JPL
558039	2014 WU_{500}	—	May 7, 2013	Kitt Peak	Spacewatch	EUN	1.3 km	MPC · JPL
558040	2014 WS_{501}	—	July 6, 2013	Haleakala	Pan-STARRS 1	·	2.3 km	MPC · JPL
558041	2014 WC_{502}	—	October 9, 2008	Catalina	CSS	·	3.4 km	MPC · JPL
558042	2014 WZ_{502}	—	January 24, 2007	Mount Lemmon	Mount Lemmon Survey	·	1.3 km	MPC · JPL
558043	2014 WW_{506}	—	April 28, 2011	Kitt Peak	Spacewatch	·	3.1 km	MPC · JPL
558044	2014 WX_{506}	—	August 15, 2013	Haleakala	Pan-STARRS 1	·	3.5 km	MPC · JPL
558045	2014 WU_{507}	—	October 28, 2014	Haleakala	Pan-STARRS 1	EUN	1.3 km	MPC · JPL
558046	2014 WA_{511}	—	November 18, 2014	Haleakala	Pan-STARRS 1	H	430 m	MPC · JPL
558047	2014 WE_{513}	—	November 25, 2014	Haleakala	Pan-STARRS 1	H	440 m	MPC · JPL
558048	2014 WL_{513}	—	October 29, 2014	Kitt Peak	Spacewatch	·	1.7 km	MPC · JPL
558049	2014 WY_{513}	—	November 21, 2014	Haleakala	Pan-STARRS 1	·	1.5 km	MPC · JPL
558050	2014 WW_{514}	—	November 26, 2014	Haleakala	Pan-STARRS 1	·	2.2 km	MPC · JPL
558051	2014 WL_{515}	—	December 20, 2004	Mount Lemmon	Mount Lemmon Survey	EOS	1.7 km	MPC · JPL
558052	2014 WP_{516}	—	September 19, 1998	Apache Point	SDSS Collaboration	·	1.5 km	MPC · JPL
558053	2014 WT_{516}	—	November 9, 2009	Mount Lemmon	Mount Lemmon Survey	·	1.8 km	MPC · JPL
558054	2014 WT_{517}	—	September 15, 2007	Mount Lemmon	Mount Lemmon Survey	·	2.8 km	MPC · JPL
558055	2014 WU_{517}	—	September 20, 1996	Kitt Peak	Spacewatch	·	2.4 km	MPC · JPL
558056	2014 WZ_{517}	—	November 27, 2013	Haleakala	Pan-STARRS 1	·	2.8 km	MPC · JPL
558057	2014 WQ_{519}	—	October 25, 2008	Catalina	CSS	·	2.6 km	MPC · JPL
558058	2014 WV_{519}	—	November 26, 2014	Haleakala	Pan-STARRS 1	·	1.6 km	MPC · JPL
558059	2014 WX_{519}	—	November 26, 2014	Haleakala	Pan-STARRS 1	·	2.5 km	MPC · JPL
558060	2014 WM_{520}	—	November 16, 2014	Mount Lemmon	Mount Lemmon Survey	·	1.7 km	MPC · JPL
558061	2014 WP_{520}	—	September 28, 2009	Mount Lemmon	Mount Lemmon Survey	·	1.5 km	MPC · JPL
558062	2014 WA_{521}	—	November 23, 2014	Haleakala	Pan-STARRS 1	·	1.7 km	MPC · JPL
558063	2014 WM_{521}	—	February 9, 2010	Catalina	CSS	·	1.8 km	MPC · JPL
558064	2014 WS_{521}	—	November 26, 2014	Haleakala	Pan-STARRS 1	AST	1.5 km	MPC · JPL
558065	2014 WF_{522}	—	January 27, 2007	Kitt Peak	Spacewatch	·	1.0 km	MPC · JPL
558066	2014 WN_{522}	—	June 15, 2012	Mount Lemmon	Mount Lemmon Survey	·	1.7 km	MPC · JPL
558067	2014 WZ_{522}	—	November 17, 2014	Haleakala	Pan-STARRS 1	·	1.4 km	MPC · JPL
558068	2014 WF_{523}	—	September 16, 2009	Kitt Peak	Spacewatch	AGN	940 m	MPC · JPL
558069	2014 WT_{523}	—	November 17, 2014	Haleakala	Pan-STARRS 1	·	2.0 km	MPC · JPL
558070	2014 WU_{523}	—	November 17, 2014	Haleakala	Pan-STARRS 1	·	1.2 km	MPC · JPL
558071	2014 WE_{524}	—	December 18, 2009	Mount Lemmon	Mount Lemmon Survey	·	1.4 km	MPC · JPL
558072	2014 WR_{524}	—	August 17, 2009	Kitt Peak	Spacewatch	·	1.6 km	MPC · JPL
558073	2014 WW_{525}	—	March 11, 2003	Kitt Peak	Spacewatch	·	2.0 km	MPC · JPL
558074	2014 WT_{526}	—	November 21, 2014	Haleakala	Pan-STARRS 1	·	2.0 km	MPC · JPL
558075	2014 WC_{527}	—	November 21, 2014	Haleakala	Pan-STARRS 1	BRA	1.4 km	MPC · JPL
558076	2014 WG_{527}	—	September 6, 2013	Kitt Peak	Spacewatch	EOS	1.6 km	MPC · JPL
558077	2014 WJ_{527}	—	November 21, 2014	Haleakala	Pan-STARRS 1	·	2.7 km	MPC · JPL
558078	2014 WK_{527}	—	September 13, 2013	Mount Lemmon	Mount Lemmon Survey	·	2.2 km	MPC · JPL
558079	2014 WC_{528}	—	February 10, 2011	Mount Lemmon	Mount Lemmon Survey	HOF	1.8 km	MPC · JPL
558080	2014 WE_{528}	—	January 8, 2011	Mount Lemmon	Mount Lemmon Survey	·	1.4 km	MPC · JPL
558081	2014 WU_{528}	—	November 9, 2013	Mount Lemmon	Mount Lemmon Survey	·	3.1 km	MPC · JPL
558082	2014 WZ_{528}	—	October 17, 2009	Kitt Peak	Spacewatch	·	1.5 km	MPC · JPL
558083	2014 WA_{529}	—	January 14, 2011	Mount Lemmon	Mount Lemmon Survey	·	1.4 km	MPC · JPL
558084	2014 WG_{529}	—	September 3, 2008	Kitt Peak	Spacewatch	·	1.3 km	MPC · JPL
558085	2014 WM_{529}	—	November 23, 2014	Mount Lemmon	Mount Lemmon Survey	·	1.2 km	MPC · JPL
558086	2014 WB_{530}	—	August 30, 2002	Kitt Peak	Spacewatch	TIR	1.8 km	MPC · JPL
558087	2014 WF_{531}	—	November 26, 2014	Haleakala	Pan-STARRS 1	·	1.6 km	MPC · JPL
558088	2014 WL_{534}	—	November 29, 2014	Haleakala	Pan-STARRS 1	·	2.1 km	MPC · JPL
558089	2014 WT_{534}	—	November 30, 2014	Haleakala	Pan-STARRS 1	·	1.3 km	MPC · JPL
558090	2014 WZ_{534}	—	September 23, 2008	Mount Lemmon	Mount Lemmon Survey	·	1.9 km	MPC · JPL
558091	2014 WE_{535}	—	November 20, 2014	Haleakala	Pan-STARRS 1	L5	10 km	MPC · JPL
558092	2014 WG_{535}	—	December 18, 2009	Mount Lemmon	Mount Lemmon Survey	·	2.5 km	MPC · JPL
558093	2014 WW_{535}	—	November 23, 2014	Haleakala	Pan-STARRS 1	centaur	90 km	MPC · JPL
558094	2014 WX_{535}	—	November 23, 2014	Haleakala	Pan-STARRS 1	centaur	40 km	MPC · JPL
558095	2014 WA_{536}	—	November 23, 2014	Haleakala	Pan-STARRS 1	res · 2:5	144 km	MPC · JPL
558096	2014 WM_{538}	—	November 22, 2014	Haleakala	Pan-STARRS 1	·	1.6 km	MPC · JPL
558097	2014 WU_{542}	—	November 23, 2014	Haleakala	Pan-STARRS 1	T_{j} (2.91)	3.6 km	MPC · JPL
558098	2014 WO_{543}	—	August 30, 2005	Palomar	NEAT	·	1.3 km	MPC · JPL
558099	2014 WA_{545}	—	November 18, 2014	Haleakala	Pan-STARRS 1	·	2.1 km	MPC · JPL
558100	2014 WF_{546}	—	February 6, 1999	Mauna Kea	Anderson, J., Veillet, C.	·	2.4 km	MPC · JPL

== 558101–558200 ==
back to top

Designation			Discovery			Properties		Ref
Permanent	Provisional	Named after	Date	Site	Discoverer(s)	Category	Diam.	Ref
558101	2014 WU_{546}	—	November 27, 2014	Catalina	CSS	T_{j} (2.98)	2.5 km	MPC · JPL
558102	2014 WO_{558}	—	November 17, 2014	Haleakala	Pan-STARRS 1	·	1.8 km	MPC · JPL
558103	2014 WK_{562}	—	January 18, 2016	Haleakala	Pan-STARRS 1	·	2.6 km	MPC · JPL
558104	2014 WL_{564}	—	November 27, 2014	Haleakala	Pan-STARRS 1	L5	7.3 km	MPC · JPL
558105	2014 WP_{564}	—	November 28, 2014	Haleakala	Pan-STARRS 1	·	1.5 km	MPC · JPL
558106	2014 WQ_{564}	—	November 22, 2014	Haleakala	Pan-STARRS 1	·	1.9 km	MPC · JPL
558107	2014 WW_{564}	—	November 29, 2014	Mount Lemmon	Mount Lemmon Survey	EOS	1.3 km	MPC · JPL
558108	2014 WE_{565}	—	November 29, 2014	Mount Lemmon	Mount Lemmon Survey	·	1.5 km	MPC · JPL
558109	2014 WG_{565}	—	February 5, 2011	Haleakala	Pan-STARRS 1	·	1.1 km	MPC · JPL
558110	2014 WK_{565}	—	November 19, 2014	Haleakala	Pan-STARRS 1	·	1.4 km	MPC · JPL
558111	2014 WD_{567}	—	November 27, 2014	Haleakala	Pan-STARRS 1	·	1.4 km	MPC · JPL
558112	2014 WH_{567}	—	November 26, 2014	Haleakala	Pan-STARRS 1	·	1.9 km	MPC · JPL
558113	2014 WR_{567}	—	November 24, 2014	Haleakala	Pan-STARRS 1	WIT	780 m	MPC · JPL
558114	2014 WX_{567}	—	November 29, 2014	Mount Lemmon	Mount Lemmon Survey	HOF	1.9 km	MPC · JPL
558115	2014 WF_{568}	—	November 28, 2014	Haleakala	Pan-STARRS 1	HOF	1.8 km	MPC · JPL
558116	2014 WY_{570}	—	November 20, 2014	Haleakala	Pan-STARRS 1	·	1.1 km	MPC · JPL
558117	2014 WE_{571}	—	November 27, 2014	Haleakala	Pan-STARRS 1	·	1.8 km	MPC · JPL
558118	2014 WT_{572}	—	November 26, 2014	Haleakala	Pan-STARRS 1	·	2.5 km	MPC · JPL
558119	2014 WR_{573}	—	October 22, 2009	Mount Lemmon	Mount Lemmon Survey	HOF	2.4 km	MPC · JPL
558120	2014 WS_{573}	—	November 17, 2014	Haleakala	Pan-STARRS 1	·	1.4 km	MPC · JPL
558121	2014 WC_{574}	—	November 22, 2014	Haleakala	Pan-STARRS 1	L5	8.5 km	MPC · JPL
558122	2014 WL_{575}	—	November 21, 2014	Haleakala	Pan-STARRS 1	·	1.4 km	MPC · JPL
558123	2014 WA_{586}	—	May 9, 2010	WISE	WISE	·	2.5 km	MPC · JPL
558124	2014 XG_{2}	—	October 28, 2014	Mount Lemmon	Mount Lemmon Survey	·	1.7 km	MPC · JPL
558125	2014 XN_{4}	—	October 18, 2014	Nogales	M. Schwartz, P. R. Holvorcem	·	1.7 km	MPC · JPL
558126	2014 XP_{4}	—	October 21, 2003	Kitt Peak	Spacewatch	·	2.0 km	MPC · JPL
558127	2014 XH_{5}	—	September 20, 2009	Kitt Peak	Spacewatch	·	1.9 km	MPC · JPL
558128	2014 XQ_{6}	—	September 30, 2008	Catalina	CSS	H	520 m	MPC · JPL
558129	2014 XE_{9}	—	September 3, 2002	Palomar	NEAT	·	2.9 km	MPC · JPL
558130	2014 XT_{10}	—	December 17, 2001	Socorro	LINEAR	H	480 m	MPC · JPL
558131	2014 XR_{11}	—	January 22, 2006	Mount Lemmon	Mount Lemmon Survey	KOR	1.1 km	MPC · JPL
558132	2014 XB_{13}	—	April 22, 1998	Kitt Peak	Spacewatch	·	2.4 km	MPC · JPL
558133	2014 XG_{15}	—	November 26, 2014	Haleakala	Pan-STARRS 1	AGN	950 m	MPC · JPL
558134	2014 XS_{15}	—	October 10, 2004	Kitt Peak	Spacewatch	·	1.5 km	MPC · JPL
558135	2014 XL_{16}	—	November 10, 2010	Kitt Peak	Spacewatch	·	1.0 km	MPC · JPL
558136	2014 XR_{16}	—	November 21, 2009	Kitt Peak	Spacewatch	·	2.0 km	MPC · JPL
558137	2014 XT_{17}	—	November 19, 2014	Mount Lemmon	Mount Lemmon Survey	·	2.8 km	MPC · JPL
558138	2014 XX_{17}	—	October 24, 2014	Mount Lemmon	Mount Lemmon Survey	·	2.0 km	MPC · JPL
558139	2014 XH_{18}	—	January 10, 2011	Mount Lemmon	Mount Lemmon Survey	·	1.2 km	MPC · JPL
558140	2014 XO_{19}	—	November 19, 2001	Anderson Mesa	LONEOS	H	390 m	MPC · JPL
558141	2014 XB_{20}	—	October 25, 2014	Haleakala	Pan-STARRS 1	·	1.2 km	MPC · JPL
558142	2014 XU_{21}	—	April 16, 2013	Haleakala	Pan-STARRS 1	·	1.5 km	MPC · JPL
558143	2014 XA_{22}	—	October 26, 2001	Palomar	NEAT	·	1.4 km	MPC · JPL
558144	2014 XH_{24}	—	August 5, 2005	Palomar	NEAT	·	1.1 km	MPC · JPL
558145	2014 XW_{24}	—	December 14, 2010	Mount Lemmon	Mount Lemmon Survey	·	1.5 km	MPC · JPL
558146	2014 XD_{25}	—	October 12, 2009	Mount Lemmon	Mount Lemmon Survey	·	1.5 km	MPC · JPL
558147	2014 XE_{27}	—	November 27, 2006	Mount Lemmon	Mount Lemmon Survey	·	1.3 km	MPC · JPL
558148	2014 XF_{27}	—	November 22, 2014	Haleakala	Pan-STARRS 1	·	2.6 km	MPC · JPL
558149	2014 XP_{28}	—	July 14, 2013	Haleakala	Pan-STARRS 1	AGN	910 m	MPC · JPL
558150	2014 XR_{28}	—	November 22, 2014	Mount Lemmon	Mount Lemmon Survey	NEM	1.5 km	MPC · JPL
558151	2014 XA_{29}	—	May 11, 2000	Kitt Peak	Spacewatch	·	2.7 km	MPC · JPL
558152	2014 XR_{29}	—	September 22, 2008	Kitt Peak	Spacewatch	·	2.0 km	MPC · JPL
558153	2014 XH_{31}	—	May 27, 2003	Kitt Peak	Spacewatch	·	2.3 km	MPC · JPL
558154	2014 XL_{31}	—	April 22, 2007	Bergisch Gladbach	W. Bickel	BRA	1.8 km	MPC · JPL
558155	2014 XU_{31}	—	December 13, 2014	Haleakala	Pan-STARRS 1	H	550 m	MPC · JPL
558156	2014 XD_{34}	—	September 15, 2009	Kitt Peak	Spacewatch	·	1.3 km	MPC · JPL
558157	2014 XF_{34}	—	November 16, 2014	Mount Lemmon	Mount Lemmon Survey	·	1.5 km	MPC · JPL
558158	2014 XS_{34}	—	November 17, 2014	Haleakala	Pan-STARRS 1	·	1.3 km	MPC · JPL
558159	2014 XJ_{35}	—	November 17, 2014	Haleakala	Pan-STARRS 1	·	1.6 km	MPC · JPL
558160	2014 XN_{37}	—	January 27, 2004	Kitt Peak	Spacewatch	·	3.3 km	MPC · JPL
558161	2014 XG_{38}	—	October 3, 2013	Mayhill-ISON	L. Elenin	TIR	2.7 km	MPC · JPL
558162	2014 XK_{38}	—	November 24, 2003	Socorro	LINEAR	·	2.1 km	MPC · JPL
558163	2014 XP_{38}	—	November 30, 2014	Mount Lemmon	Mount Lemmon Survey	·	2.0 km	MPC · JPL
558164	2014 XR_{38}	—	March 19, 2004	Siding Spring	SSS	·	1.7 km	MPC · JPL
558165	2014 XA_{39}	—	July 10, 2001	Palomar	NEAT	·	1.8 km	MPC · JPL
558166	2014 XS_{39}	—	November 28, 2014	Haleakala	Pan-STARRS 1	·	1.4 km	MPC · JPL
558167	2014 XK_{40}	—	October 3, 2013	Haleakala	Pan-STARRS 1	L5	7.4 km	MPC · JPL
558168	2014 XQ_{40}	—	December 10, 2014	Haleakala	Pan-STARRS 1	centaur	90 km	MPC · JPL
558169	2014 XK_{42}	—	November 9, 2013	Mount Lemmon	Mount Lemmon Survey	·	2.9 km	MPC · JPL
558170	2014 XF_{43}	—	March 3, 2005	Kitt Peak	Spacewatch	·	1.7 km	MPC · JPL
558171	2014 XQ_{44}	—	December 11, 2014	Mount Lemmon	Mount Lemmon Survey	L5	9.0 km	MPC · JPL
558172	2014 XC_{49}	—	December 15, 2014	Mount Lemmon	Mount Lemmon Survey	·	1.4 km	MPC · JPL
558173	2014 XR_{49}	—	December 10, 2014	Mount Lemmon	Mount Lemmon Survey	·	1.4 km	MPC · JPL
558174	2014 XB_{50}	—	December 1, 2014	Haleakala	Pan-STARRS 1	L5	8.4 km	MPC · JPL
558175	2014 XL_{50}	—	December 12, 2014	Haleakala	Pan-STARRS 1	L5	7.7 km	MPC · JPL
558176	2014 XJ_{51}	—	December 11, 2014	Mount Lemmon	Mount Lemmon Survey	TIR	2.2 km	MPC · JPL
558177	2014 YA	—	October 21, 2011	Piszkéstető	K. Sárneczky	H	650 m	MPC · JPL
558178	2014 YB_{1}	—	May 20, 2005	Mount Lemmon	Mount Lemmon Survey	H	500 m	MPC · JPL
558179	2014 YW_{1}	—	December 16, 2014	Haleakala	Pan-STARRS 1	·	2.0 km	MPC · JPL
558180	2014 YA_{3}	—	October 23, 2003	Kitt Peak	Spacewatch	·	1.7 km	MPC · JPL
558181	2014 YT_{3}	—	November 9, 2008	Mount Lemmon	Mount Lemmon Survey	·	2.6 km	MPC · JPL
558182	2014 YY_{3}	—	September 3, 2002	Palomar	NEAT	·	3.0 km	MPC · JPL
558183	2014 YZ_{3}	—	January 28, 2004	Kitt Peak	Spacewatch	·	1.9 km	MPC · JPL
558184	2014 YM_{5}	—	December 31, 2008	Mount Lemmon	Mount Lemmon Survey	(31811)	2.9 km	MPC · JPL
558185	2014 YW_{5}	—	April 30, 2011	Kitt Peak	Spacewatch	·	3.1 km	MPC · JPL
558186	2014 YY_{9}	—	October 23, 2003	Kitt Peak	Spacewatch	·	1.8 km	MPC · JPL
558187	2014 YG_{10}	—	October 31, 2013	Piszkéstető	K. Sárneczky	·	3.4 km	MPC · JPL
558188	2014 YN_{10}	—	January 17, 2004	Kitt Peak	Spacewatch	EOS	2.2 km	MPC · JPL
558189	2014 YU_{10}	—	December 20, 2014	Kitt Peak	Spacewatch	·	2.3 km	MPC · JPL
558190	2014 YS_{11}	—	November 21, 2014	Mount Lemmon	Mount Lemmon Survey	·	1.4 km	MPC · JPL
558191	2014 YS_{12}	—	July 14, 2013	Haleakala	Pan-STARRS 1	·	1.4 km	MPC · JPL
558192	2014 YW_{17}	—	September 24, 2008	Kitt Peak	Spacewatch	·	1.8 km	MPC · JPL
558193	2014 YY_{17}	—	December 20, 2014	Haleakala	Pan-STARRS 1	·	2.9 km	MPC · JPL
558194	2014 YQ_{18}	—	November 3, 2008	Mount Lemmon	Mount Lemmon Survey	·	3.5 km	MPC · JPL
558195 Eugengindl	2014 YF_{19}	Eugengindl	September 28, 2013	Piszkéstető	S. Kürti, K. Sárneczky	URS	3.6 km	MPC · JPL
558196	2014 YX_{19}	—	November 17, 2014	Haleakala	Pan-STARRS 1	·	2.3 km	MPC · JPL
558197	2014 YK_{20}	—	July 1, 2013	Haleakala	Pan-STARRS 1	·	1.9 km	MPC · JPL
558198	2014 YW_{24}	—	December 17, 2003	Kitt Peak	Spacewatch	·	3.0 km	MPC · JPL
558199	2014 YV_{25}	—	November 27, 2014	Haleakala	Pan-STARRS 1	·	2.3 km	MPC · JPL
558200	2014 YJ_{27}	—	September 23, 2008	Kitt Peak	Spacewatch	·	1.8 km	MPC · JPL

== 558201–558300 ==
back to top

Designation			Discovery			Properties		Ref
Permanent	Provisional	Named after	Date	Site	Discoverer(s)	Category	Diam.	Ref
558201	2014 YP_{27}	—	November 19, 2014	Mount Lemmon	Mount Lemmon Survey	·	2.8 km	MPC · JPL
558202	2014 YS_{31}	—	September 1, 2013	Haleakala	Pan-STARRS 1	·	1.4 km	MPC · JPL
558203	2014 YU_{31}	—	October 4, 2013	Mount Lemmon	Mount Lemmon Survey	·	3.0 km	MPC · JPL
558204	2014 YB_{33}	—	October 23, 2009	Kitt Peak	Spacewatch	AGN	990 m	MPC · JPL
558205	2014 YF_{34}	—	March 4, 2011	Mount Lemmon	Mount Lemmon Survey	HOF	2.2 km	MPC · JPL
558206	2014 YU_{35}	—	February 25, 2006	Mount Lemmon	Mount Lemmon Survey	·	1.8 km	MPC · JPL
558207	2014 YR_{36}	—	November 6, 2008	Kitt Peak	Spacewatch	(1118)	3.1 km	MPC · JPL
558208	2014 YD_{37}	—	November 26, 2014	Haleakala	Pan-STARRS 1	·	1.7 km	MPC · JPL
558209	2014 YL_{37}	—	November 6, 2008	Kitt Peak	Spacewatch	·	2.5 km	MPC · JPL
558210	2014 YZ_{37}	—	February 13, 2010	Catalina	CSS	·	1.9 km	MPC · JPL
558211	2014 YQ_{40}	—	April 6, 2011	Mount Lemmon	Mount Lemmon Survey	·	3.3 km	MPC · JPL
558212	2014 YR_{40}	—	October 24, 2014	Mount Lemmon	Mount Lemmon Survey	·	1.8 km	MPC · JPL
558213	2014 YA_{41}	—	December 31, 2008	Catalina	CSS	·	3.1 km	MPC · JPL
558214	2014 YQ_{41}	—	August 11, 2012	Tarleton State Uni	Hibbs, M.	·	3.9 km	MPC · JPL
558215	2014 YV_{41}	—	November 20, 2014	Haleakala	Pan-STARRS 1	H	590 m	MPC · JPL
558216	2014 YO_{42}	—	July 30, 2008	Črni Vrh	Skvarč, J.	H	730 m	MPC · JPL
558217	2014 YW_{45}	—	December 10, 2001	Kitt Peak	Spacewatch	WIT	1.3 km	MPC · JPL
558218	2014 YE_{47}	—	November 24, 2011	Palomar	Palomar Transient Factory	H	620 m	MPC · JPL
558219	2014 YS_{48}	—	March 14, 2010	Kitt Peak	Spacewatch	·	2.1 km	MPC · JPL
558220	2014 YX_{48}	—	February 19, 2010	Kitt Peak	Spacewatch	·	2.2 km	MPC · JPL
558221	2014 YG_{49}	—	October 26, 2014	Mount Lemmon	Mount Lemmon Survey	·	1.3 km	MPC · JPL
558222	2014 YN_{49}	—	January 21, 2015	Haleakala	Pan-STARRS 1	·	3.1 km	MPC · JPL
558223	2014 YR_{49}	—	December 17, 2009	Kitt Peak	Spacewatch	H	580 m	MPC · JPL
558224	2014 YC_{50}	—	December 29, 2014	Haleakala	Pan-STARRS 1	cubewano (hot)	237 km	MPC · JPL
558225	2014 YE_{52}	—	December 20, 2014	Haleakala	Pan-STARRS 1	H	400 m	MPC · JPL
558226	2014 YC_{55}	—	December 29, 2014	Haleakala	Pan-STARRS 1	·	2.7 km	MPC · JPL
558227	2014 YV_{55}	—	November 2, 2008	Catalina	CSS	·	2.4 km	MPC · JPL
558228	2014 YH_{56}	—	October 23, 2013	Haleakala	Pan-STARRS 1	·	1.5 km	MPC · JPL
558229	2014 YK_{57}	—	January 7, 2010	Kitt Peak	Spacewatch	·	2.0 km	MPC · JPL
558230	2014 YC_{58}	—	November 19, 2008	Kitt Peak	Spacewatch	·	3.2 km	MPC · JPL
558231	2014 YD_{58}	—	August 21, 2012	Haleakala	Pan-STARRS 1	·	2.9 km	MPC · JPL
558232	2014 YG_{59}	—	May 30, 2012	Mount Lemmon	Mount Lemmon Survey	EOS	1.8 km	MPC · JPL
558233	2014 YL_{60}	—	October 5, 2013	Mount Lemmon	Mount Lemmon Survey	KOR	1 km	MPC · JPL
558234	2014 YO_{60}	—	December 21, 2014	Haleakala	Pan-STARRS 1	VER	2.6 km	MPC · JPL
558235	2014 YG_{61}	—	December 26, 2014	Haleakala	Pan-STARRS 1	·	1.5 km	MPC · JPL
558236	2014 YH_{61}	—	January 31, 2004	Apache Point	SDSS	T_{j} (2.98)	3.4 km	MPC · JPL
558237	2014 YW_{61}	—	September 15, 2013	Mount Lemmon	Mount Lemmon Survey	T_{j} (2.99) · EUP	2.8 km	MPC · JPL
558238	2014 YE_{62}	—	August 10, 2007	Kitt Peak	Spacewatch	·	2.4 km	MPC · JPL
558239	2014 YM_{62}	—	December 29, 2014	Haleakala	Pan-STARRS 1	·	2.4 km	MPC · JPL
558240	2014 YX_{63}	—	December 20, 2014	Haleakala	Pan-STARRS 1	H	550 m	MPC · JPL
558241	2014 YE_{69}	—	August 7, 2018	Haleakala	Pan-STARRS 1	·	2.1 km	MPC · JPL
558242	2014 YX_{70}	—	December 29, 2014	Haleakala	Pan-STARRS 1	·	2.7 km	MPC · JPL
558243	2014 YL_{73}	—	December 30, 2014	Haleakala	Pan-STARRS 1	·	1.4 km	MPC · JPL
558244	2014 YW_{73}	—	December 29, 2014	Haleakala	Pan-STARRS 1	(5651)	2.3 km	MPC · JPL
558245	2014 YZ_{73}	—	January 13, 2016	Haleakala	Pan-STARRS 1	·	1.7 km	MPC · JPL
558246	2014 YY_{74}	—	December 21, 2014	Mount Lemmon	Mount Lemmon Survey	EOS	1.8 km	MPC · JPL
558247	2014 YN_{76}	—	February 5, 2011	Haleakala	Pan-STARRS 1	·	1.7 km	MPC · JPL
558248	2014 YY_{76}	—	December 20, 2014	Haleakala	Pan-STARRS 1	·	1.7 km	MPC · JPL
558249	2014 YD_{77}	—	December 26, 2014	Haleakala	Pan-STARRS 1	·	1.8 km	MPC · JPL
558250	2014 YJ_{77}	—	December 20, 2014	Kitt Peak	Spacewatch	·	1.9 km	MPC · JPL
558251	2014 YY_{79}	—	December 29, 2014	Haleakala	Pan-STARRS 1	PHO	700 m	MPC · JPL
558252	2014 YN_{80}	—	December 21, 2014	Haleakala	Pan-STARRS 1	·	1.5 km	MPC · JPL
558253	2014 YM_{86}	—	December 26, 2014	Haleakala	Pan-STARRS 1	·	2.6 km	MPC · JPL
558254	2015 AJ	—	March 4, 2012	Catalina	CSS	HNS	1.7 km	MPC · JPL
558255	2015 AR	—	November 10, 2014	Haleakala	Pan-STARRS 1	EUN	1.1 km	MPC · JPL
558256	2015 AG_{3}	—	March 9, 2005	Mount Lemmon	Mount Lemmon Survey	EOS	2.1 km	MPC · JPL
558257	2015 AT_{4}	—	March 29, 2012	Haleakala	Pan-STARRS 1	·	1.7 km	MPC · JPL
558258	2015 AV_{4}	—	October 2, 2014	Haleakala	Pan-STARRS 1	·	1.3 km	MPC · JPL
558259	2015 AA_{5}	—	April 20, 2009	Kitt Peak	Spacewatch	·	1.4 km	MPC · JPL
558260	2015 AF_{5}	—	October 2, 2014	Haleakala	Pan-STARRS 1	·	1.2 km	MPC · JPL
558261	2015 AJ_{5}	—	November 21, 2014	Haleakala	Pan-STARRS 1	L5	7.7 km	MPC · JPL
558262	2015 AL_{5}	—	September 4, 2014	Haleakala	Pan-STARRS 1	·	1.1 km	MPC · JPL
558263	2015 AK_{8}	—	February 18, 2010	Mount Lemmon	Mount Lemmon Survey	TIR	2.1 km	MPC · JPL
558264	2015 AT_{9}	—	December 2, 2008	Kitt Peak	Spacewatch	·	2.3 km	MPC · JPL
558265	2015 AF_{10}	—	April 5, 2011	Kitt Peak	Spacewatch	·	3.0 km	MPC · JPL
558266	2015 AP_{10}	—	December 27, 2014	Haleakala	Pan-STARRS 1	TIR	2.1 km	MPC · JPL
558267	2015 AE_{11}	—	October 25, 2008	Kitt Peak	Spacewatch	·	2.4 km	MPC · JPL
558268	2015 AV_{12}	—	November 21, 2014	Haleakala	Pan-STARRS 1	T_{j} (2.98)	4.0 km	MPC · JPL
558269	2015 AX_{13}	—	November 8, 2008	Kitt Peak	Spacewatch	·	2.1 km	MPC · JPL
558270	2015 AM_{14}	—	September 28, 2008	Mount Lemmon	Mount Lemmon Survey	·	1.9 km	MPC · JPL
558271	2015 AZ_{14}	—	September 3, 2013	Mount Lemmon	Mount Lemmon Survey	TIR	2.0 km	MPC · JPL
558272	2015 AP_{16}	—	November 20, 2008	Kitt Peak	Spacewatch	·	2.6 km	MPC · JPL
558273	2015 AE_{19}	—	November 1, 2014	Mount Lemmon	Mount Lemmon Survey	·	2.2 km	MPC · JPL
558274	2015 AT_{19}	—	September 14, 2013	Haleakala	Pan-STARRS 1	·	2.1 km	MPC · JPL
558275	2015 AN_{20}	—	January 29, 2011	Kitt Peak	Spacewatch	EOS	1.8 km	MPC · JPL
558276	2015 AY_{20}	—	January 7, 2010	Mount Lemmon	Mount Lemmon Survey	·	2.5 km	MPC · JPL
558277	2015 AO_{21}	—	December 22, 2005	Kitt Peak	Spacewatch	DOR	1.7 km	MPC · JPL
558278	2015 AX_{21}	—	February 22, 2007	Kitt Peak	Spacewatch	·	1.4 km	MPC · JPL
558279	2015 AY_{21}	—	January 10, 2002	Campo Imperatore	CINEOS	·	1.5 km	MPC · JPL
558280	2015 AV_{22}	—	September 5, 2013	Haleakala	Pan-STARRS 1	·	1.9 km	MPC · JPL
558281	2015 AY_{23}	—	May 24, 2011	Mount Lemmon	Mount Lemmon Survey	·	2.5 km	MPC · JPL
558282	2015 AF_{24}	—	July 29, 2009	Kitt Peak	Spacewatch	·	1.3 km	MPC · JPL
558283	2015 AN_{25}	—	September 1, 2013	Mount Lemmon	Mount Lemmon Survey	·	2.9 km	MPC · JPL
558284	2015 AJ_{27}	—	October 23, 2013	Haleakala	Pan-STARRS 1	·	2.3 km	MPC · JPL
558285	2015 AQ_{27}	—	January 23, 2006	Kitt Peak	Spacewatch	AGN	1.1 km	MPC · JPL
558286	2015 AS_{27}	—	November 23, 2009	Kitt Peak	Spacewatch	·	1.6 km	MPC · JPL
558287	2015 AX_{27}	—	June 21, 2007	Mount Lemmon	Mount Lemmon Survey	·	2.6 km	MPC · JPL
558288	2015 AR_{28}	—	January 13, 2015	Haleakala	Pan-STARRS 1	·	2.9 km	MPC · JPL
558289	2015 AD_{29}	—	October 10, 2008	Mount Lemmon	Mount Lemmon Survey	DOR	2.5 km	MPC · JPL
558290	2015 AH_{29}	—	September 3, 2008	Kitt Peak	Spacewatch	KOR	1.2 km	MPC · JPL
558291	2015 AL_{29}	—	February 9, 2010	Mount Lemmon	Mount Lemmon Survey	·	1.8 km	MPC · JPL
558292	2015 AN_{29}	—	March 29, 2011	Mount Lemmon	Mount Lemmon Survey	KOR	1.2 km	MPC · JPL
558293	2015 AS_{29}	—	September 4, 2008	Kitt Peak	Spacewatch	KOR	930 m	MPC · JPL
558294	2015 AS_{31}	—	March 13, 2010	Mount Lemmon	Mount Lemmon Survey	THM	1.8 km	MPC · JPL
558295	2015 AS_{33}	—	December 21, 2014	Haleakala	Pan-STARRS 1	·	3.2 km	MPC · JPL
558296	2015 AQ_{34}	—	September 26, 2003	Apache Point	SDSS Collaboration	·	1.7 km	MPC · JPL
558297	2015 AX_{34}	—	January 10, 2010	Kitt Peak	Spacewatch	·	1.9 km	MPC · JPL
558298	2015 AE_{35}	—	October 8, 2008	Kitt Peak	Spacewatch	·	1.4 km	MPC · JPL
558299	2015 AH_{36}	—	October 13, 2013	Mount Lemmon	Mount Lemmon Survey	HOF	2.4 km	MPC · JPL
558300	2015 AC_{37}	—	November 21, 2003	Kitt Peak	Spacewatch	·	1.8 km	MPC · JPL

== 558301–558400 ==
back to top

Designation			Discovery			Properties		Ref
Permanent	Provisional	Named after	Date	Site	Discoverer(s)	Category	Diam.	Ref
558301	2015 AQ_{37}	—	June 1, 2008	Mount Lemmon	Mount Lemmon Survey	·	1.5 km	MPC · JPL
558302	2015 AJ_{38}	—	December 21, 2014	Haleakala	Pan-STARRS 1	·	2.7 km	MPC · JPL
558303	2015 AY_{38}	—	September 26, 2003	Apache Point	SDSS Collaboration	EOS	1.8 km	MPC · JPL
558304	2015 AA_{40}	—	October 2, 2008	Mount Lemmon	Mount Lemmon Survey	KOR	1.1 km	MPC · JPL
558305	2015 AO_{41}	—	September 26, 2003	Apache Point	SDSS Collaboration	·	1.8 km	MPC · JPL
558306	2015 AB_{43}	—	October 22, 2003	Haleakala	NEAT	·	1.7 km	MPC · JPL
558307	2015 AS_{45}	—	January 15, 2015	Haleakala	Pan-STARRS 1	T_{j} (2.76) · AMO +1km	1.1 km	MPC · JPL
558308	2015 AV_{45}	—	September 10, 2004	Kitt Peak	Spacewatch	GEF	1.1 km	MPC · JPL
558309	2015 AB_{47}	—	October 1, 2008	Mount Lemmon	Mount Lemmon Survey	·	1.6 km	MPC · JPL
558310	2015 AT_{47}	—	May 16, 2009	Mount Lemmon	Mount Lemmon Survey	L5	9.4 km	MPC · JPL
558311	2015 AK_{48}	—	October 31, 2014	Haleakala	Pan-STARRS 1	·	2.4 km	MPC · JPL
558312	2015 AY_{48}	—	December 15, 2014	Haleakala	Pan-STARRS 1	TIR	2.6 km	MPC · JPL
558313	2015 AD_{49}	—	July 14, 2013	Haleakala	Pan-STARRS 1	HNS	950 m	MPC · JPL
558314	2015 AD_{51}	—	October 22, 2003	Apache Point	SDSS Collaboration	·	1.6 km	MPC · JPL
558315	2015 AH_{51}	—	August 27, 2013	Haleakala	Pan-STARRS 1	EUN	1.4 km	MPC · JPL
558316	2015 AN_{51}	—	March 6, 2011	Mount Lemmon	Mount Lemmon Survey	HOF	2.1 km	MPC · JPL
558317	2015 AL_{53}	—	January 23, 2006	Mount Lemmon	Mount Lemmon Survey	PAD	1.3 km	MPC · JPL
558318	2015 AM_{53}	—	January 13, 2015	Haleakala	Pan-STARRS 1	·	1.9 km	MPC · JPL
558319	2015 AX_{53}	—	February 12, 2008	Mount Lemmon	Mount Lemmon Survey	·	1.1 km	MPC · JPL
558320	2015 AM_{54}	—	October 1, 2008	Mount Lemmon	Mount Lemmon Survey	EOS	1.7 km	MPC · JPL
558321	2015 AQ_{55}	—	May 12, 2007	Mount Lemmon	Mount Lemmon Survey	·	1.8 km	MPC · JPL
558322	2015 AN_{56}	—	December 1, 2003	Kitt Peak	Spacewatch	·	2.1 km	MPC · JPL
558323	2015 AO_{56}	—	August 29, 2013	Haleakala	Pan-STARRS 1	·	1.6 km	MPC · JPL
558324	2015 AL_{58}	—	March 6, 2011	Mount Lemmon	Mount Lemmon Survey	AST	1.6 km	MPC · JPL
558325	2015 AA_{59}	—	January 13, 2015	Haleakala	Pan-STARRS 1	HOF	2.1 km	MPC · JPL
558326	2015 AC_{60}	—	January 13, 2015	Haleakala	Pan-STARRS 1	·	1.7 km	MPC · JPL
558327	2015 AJ_{61}	—	October 25, 2003	Kitt Peak	Spacewatch	TEL	1.5 km	MPC · JPL
558328	2015 AQ_{61}	—	January 13, 2015	Haleakala	Pan-STARRS 1	·	2.7 km	MPC · JPL
558329	2015 AC_{65}	—	January 13, 2015	Haleakala	Pan-STARRS 1	·	2.0 km	MPC · JPL
558330	2015 AD_{65}	—	October 19, 1998	Kitt Peak	Spacewatch	KOR	1.5 km	MPC · JPL
558331	2015 AN_{65}	—	October 24, 2005	Mauna Kea	A. Boattini	·	1.8 km	MPC · JPL
558332	2015 AR_{66}	—	October 12, 2013	Mount Lemmon	Mount Lemmon Survey	KOR	1.1 km	MPC · JPL
558333	2015 AE_{67}	—	January 10, 2015	Palomar	Palomar Transient Factory	EOS	1.9 km	MPC · JPL
558334	2015 AJ_{67}	—	October 21, 2008	Kitt Peak	Spacewatch	·	2.3 km	MPC · JPL
558335	2015 AF_{68}	—	September 14, 2013	Haleakala	Pan-STARRS 1	TEL	1.3 km	MPC · JPL
558336	2015 AO_{68}	—	May 21, 2012	Haleakala	Pan-STARRS 1	·	2.1 km	MPC · JPL
558337	2015 AW_{69}	—	October 1, 2003	Kitt Peak	Spacewatch	·	2.1 km	MPC · JPL
558338	2015 AJ_{71}	—	November 27, 2009	Mount Lemmon	Mount Lemmon Survey	EOS	2.4 km	MPC · JPL
558339	2015 AQ_{71}	—	December 1, 2005	Kitt Peak	Wasserman, L. H., Millis, R. L.	·	1.6 km	MPC · JPL
558340	2015 AV_{71}	—	January 13, 2015	Haleakala	Pan-STARRS 1	KOR	1.2 km	MPC · JPL
558341	2015 AW_{71}	—	May 7, 2006	Kitt Peak	Spacewatch	EOS	1.9 km	MPC · JPL
558342	2015 AX_{72}	—	October 1, 2013	Mount Lemmon	Mount Lemmon Survey	·	1.4 km	MPC · JPL
558343	2015 AP_{74}	—	October 20, 2008	Kitt Peak	Spacewatch	·	2.1 km	MPC · JPL
558344	2015 AK_{75}	—	September 1, 2013	Mount Lemmon	Mount Lemmon Survey	·	2.7 km	MPC · JPL
558345	2015 AS_{75}	—	February 16, 2010	Kitt Peak	Spacewatch	·	1.5 km	MPC · JPL
558346	2015 AJ_{77}	—	October 2, 2008	Kitt Peak	Spacewatch	·	1.4 km	MPC · JPL
558347	2015 AU_{78}	—	September 14, 2013	Haleakala	Pan-STARRS 1	·	1.3 km	MPC · JPL
558348	2015 AW_{78}	—	January 13, 2015	Haleakala	Pan-STARRS 1	·	1.4 km	MPC · JPL
558349	2015 AE_{80}	—	August 10, 2002	Cerro Tololo	Deep Ecliptic Survey	·	1.9 km	MPC · JPL
558350	2015 AP_{82}	—	April 30, 2011	Mount Lemmon	Mount Lemmon Survey	·	1.6 km	MPC · JPL
558351	2015 AV_{82}	—	March 30, 2011	Piszkés-tető	K. Sárneczky, Z. Kuli	·	2.0 km	MPC · JPL
558352	2015 AG_{84}	—	November 3, 2008	Mount Lemmon	Mount Lemmon Survey	EOS	1.8 km	MPC · JPL
558353	2015 AU_{86}	—	October 5, 2013	Mount Lemmon	Mount Lemmon Survey	·	1.9 km	MPC · JPL
558354	2015 AX_{86}	—	January 6, 2010	Kitt Peak	Spacewatch	EOS	2.4 km	MPC · JPL
558355	2015 AC_{87}	—	April 5, 2011	Mount Lemmon	Mount Lemmon Survey	·	1.4 km	MPC · JPL
558356	2015 AL_{88}	—	January 13, 2015	Haleakala	Pan-STARRS 1	MRX	1.1 km	MPC · JPL
558357	2015 AU_{88}	—	January 13, 2015	Haleakala	Pan-STARRS 1	·	2.1 km	MPC · JPL
558358	2015 AS_{89}	—	November 6, 2008	Mount Lemmon	Mount Lemmon Survey	TIR	2.8 km	MPC · JPL
558359	2015 AX_{89}	—	November 8, 2008	Mount Lemmon	Mount Lemmon Survey	·	1.7 km	MPC · JPL
558360	2015 AA_{91}	—	October 6, 2008	Mount Lemmon	Mount Lemmon Survey	·	2.5 km	MPC · JPL
558361	2015 AC_{91}	—	October 3, 2008	Mount Lemmon	Mount Lemmon Survey	KOR	1.1 km	MPC · JPL
558362	2015 AJ_{91}	—	October 4, 2013	Mount Lemmon	Mount Lemmon Survey	·	1.5 km	MPC · JPL
558363	2015 AZ_{93}	—	March 11, 2005	Mount Lemmon	Mount Lemmon Survey	·	3.9 km	MPC · JPL
558364	2015 AK_{95}	—	January 14, 2015	Haleakala	Pan-STARRS 1	L5	7.6 km	MPC · JPL
558365	2015 AJ_{97}	—	January 10, 2007	Mount Lemmon	Mount Lemmon Survey	BAR	1.1 km	MPC · JPL
558366	2015 AB_{98}	—	November 26, 2003	Kitt Peak	Spacewatch	TEL	1.4 km	MPC · JPL
558367	2015 AC_{98}	—	September 19, 2003	Kitt Peak	Spacewatch	·	1.3 km	MPC · JPL
558368	2015 AM_{100}	—	August 25, 2003	Cerro Tololo	Deep Ecliptic Survey	·	1.5 km	MPC · JPL
558369	2015 AN_{100}	—	November 4, 2013	Mount Lemmon	Mount Lemmon Survey	·	1.7 km	MPC · JPL
558370	2015 AO_{100}	—	May 6, 2011	Mount Lemmon	Mount Lemmon Survey	·	1.5 km	MPC · JPL
558371	2015 AO_{101}	—	April 6, 2011	Mount Lemmon	Mount Lemmon Survey	KOR	1.1 km	MPC · JPL
558372	2015 AX_{101}	—	May 22, 2012	Mount Lemmon	Mount Lemmon Survey	·	1.9 km	MPC · JPL
558373	2015 AP_{104}	—	October 2, 2013	Mount Lemmon	Mount Lemmon Survey	KOR	1.2 km	MPC · JPL
558374	2015 AR_{110}	—	December 21, 2014	Haleakala	Pan-STARRS 1	·	1.8 km	MPC · JPL
558375	2015 AP_{112}	—	December 21, 2014	Mount Lemmon	Mount Lemmon Survey	·	1.5 km	MPC · JPL
558376	2015 AS_{112}	—	September 28, 2003	Kitt Peak	Spacewatch	KOR	980 m	MPC · JPL
558377	2015 AJ_{115}	—	December 20, 2009	Mount Lemmon	Mount Lemmon Survey	·	1.3 km	MPC · JPL
558378	2015 AC_{117}	—	October 4, 2013	Kitt Peak	Spacewatch	·	1.6 km	MPC · JPL
558379	2015 AL_{117}	—	December 21, 2014	Haleakala	Pan-STARRS 1	·	1.9 km	MPC · JPL
558380	2015 AT_{117}	—	December 21, 2014	Haleakala	Pan-STARRS 1	·	1.3 km	MPC · JPL
558381	2015 AB_{118}	—	October 28, 2008	Mount Lemmon	Mount Lemmon Survey	·	1.5 km	MPC · JPL
558382	2015 AC_{118}	—	December 21, 2014	Haleakala	Pan-STARRS 1	·	1.5 km	MPC · JPL
558383	2015 AR_{120}	—	October 8, 2004	Kitt Peak	Spacewatch	AEO	830 m	MPC · JPL
558384	2015 AU_{121}	—	September 10, 2008	Kitt Peak	Spacewatch	KOR	1.2 km	MPC · JPL
558385	2015 AW_{123}	—	March 15, 2010	Mount Lemmon	Mount Lemmon Survey	THM	1.9 km	MPC · JPL
558386	2015 AG_{125}	—	March 10, 1999	Kitt Peak	Spacewatch	·	2.8 km	MPC · JPL
558387	2015 AQ_{125}	—	September 5, 2008	Kitt Peak	Spacewatch	AEO	1.1 km	MPC · JPL
558388	2015 AB_{126}	—	September 12, 2013	Catalina	CSS	·	2.0 km	MPC · JPL
558389	2015 AD_{126}	—	December 21, 2014	Haleakala	Pan-STARRS 1	·	1.8 km	MPC · JPL
558390	2015 AD_{127}	—	February 13, 2010	Mount Lemmon	Mount Lemmon Survey	·	1.8 km	MPC · JPL
558391	2015 AX_{127}	—	January 14, 2015	Haleakala	Pan-STARRS 1	·	1.8 km	MPC · JPL
558392	2015 AW_{128}	—	December 21, 2014	Haleakala	Pan-STARRS 1	·	2.9 km	MPC · JPL
558393	2015 AQ_{133}	—	October 22, 2003	Apache Point	SDSS Collaboration	·	2.0 km	MPC · JPL
558394	2015 AY_{135}	—	January 23, 1999	Kitt Peak	Spacewatch	·	2.3 km	MPC · JPL
558395	2015 AV_{138}	—	September 13, 2013	Mount Lemmon	Mount Lemmon Survey	·	1.6 km	MPC · JPL
558396	2015 AX_{139}	—	November 18, 2009	Kitt Peak	Spacewatch	AGN	940 m	MPC · JPL
558397	2015 AY_{139}	—	October 1, 2013	Mount Lemmon	Mount Lemmon Survey	·	1.4 km	MPC · JPL
558398 Nagysándor	2015 AT_{140}	Nagysándor	August 31, 2013	Piszkéstető	T. Csörgei, K. Sárneczky	KOR	1.3 km	MPC · JPL
558399	2015 AS_{142}	—	September 3, 2008	Kitt Peak	Spacewatch	KOR	1.3 km	MPC · JPL
558400	2015 AG_{143}	—	April 29, 2011	Mount Lemmon	Mount Lemmon Survey	·	1.6 km	MPC · JPL

== 558401–558500 ==
back to top

Designation			Discovery			Properties		Ref
Permanent	Provisional	Named after	Date	Site	Discoverer(s)	Category	Diam.	Ref
558401	2015 AO_{143}	—	September 14, 2013	Haleakala	Pan-STARRS 1	·	1.4 km	MPC · JPL
558402	2015 AY_{143}	—	September 7, 2008	Mount Lemmon	Mount Lemmon Survey	KOR	1.2 km	MPC · JPL
558403	2015 AG_{144}	—	September 3, 2013	Calar Alto	F. Hormuth	KOR	1.1 km	MPC · JPL
558404	2015 AG_{145}	—	November 7, 2008	Mount Lemmon	Mount Lemmon Survey	·	2.1 km	MPC · JPL
558405	2015 AC_{146}	—	December 4, 2008	Kitt Peak	Spacewatch	THM	1.7 km	MPC · JPL
558406	2015 AJ_{147}	—	September 15, 2013	Mount Lemmon	Mount Lemmon Survey	KOR	1.1 km	MPC · JPL
558407	2015 AY_{147}	—	October 13, 2013	Mount Lemmon	Mount Lemmon Survey	KOR	1.1 km	MPC · JPL
558408	2015 AE_{148}	—	December 14, 1998	Kitt Peak	Spacewatch	·	3.0 km	MPC · JPL
558409	2015 AA_{156}	—	March 11, 2005	Kitt Peak	Deep Ecliptic Survey	·	1.9 km	MPC · JPL
558410	2015 AC_{156}	—	December 21, 2014	Haleakala	Pan-STARRS 1	·	1.8 km	MPC · JPL
558411	2015 AT_{156}	—	January 14, 2015	Haleakala	Pan-STARRS 1	·	1.8 km	MPC · JPL
558412	2015 AX_{156}	—	October 4, 2013	Mount Lemmon	Mount Lemmon Survey	·	1.2 km	MPC · JPL
558413	2015 AU_{158}	—	January 21, 2004	Socorro	LINEAR	·	2.3 km	MPC · JPL
558414	2015 AM_{160}	—	September 11, 2004	Kitt Peak	Spacewatch	·	1.4 km	MPC · JPL
558415	2015 AD_{162}	—	January 14, 2015	Haleakala	Pan-STARRS 1	·	2.7 km	MPC · JPL
558416	2015 AA_{163}	—	May 13, 2005	Mount Lemmon	Mount Lemmon Survey	·	2.0 km	MPC · JPL
558417	2015 AN_{163}	—	October 26, 2013	Catalina	CSS	HYG	3.1 km	MPC · JPL
558418	2015 AY_{163}	—	January 31, 2006	Kitt Peak	Spacewatch	AGN	1.2 km	MPC · JPL
558419	2015 AF_{166}	—	November 4, 2013	Haleakala	Pan-STARRS 1	EOS	1.7 km	MPC · JPL
558420	2015 AQ_{166}	—	November 4, 1996	Kitt Peak	Spacewatch	·	3.3 km	MPC · JPL
558421	2015 AD_{168}	—	December 21, 2014	Haleakala	Pan-STARRS 1	·	1.8 km	MPC · JPL
558422	2015 AL_{168}	—	January 14, 2015	Haleakala	Pan-STARRS 1	·	1.8 km	MPC · JPL
558423	2015 AA_{169}	—	October 29, 2008	Mount Lemmon	Mount Lemmon Survey	·	1.3 km	MPC · JPL
558424	2015 AR_{169}	—	January 14, 2015	Haleakala	Pan-STARRS 1	·	1.4 km	MPC · JPL
558425	2015 AS_{171}	—	February 15, 2010	Mount Lemmon	Mount Lemmon Survey	·	2.4 km	MPC · JPL
558426	2015 AT_{173}	—	December 21, 2014	Haleakala	Pan-STARRS 1	EOS	1.5 km	MPC · JPL
558427	2015 AC_{180}	—	September 26, 2003	Apache Point	SDSS Collaboration	KOR	1.1 km	MPC · JPL
558428	2015 AF_{181}	—	September 12, 2013	Catalina	CSS	·	4.3 km	MPC · JPL
558429	2015 AQ_{181}	—	January 16, 2004	Kitt Peak	Spacewatch	·	2.3 km	MPC · JPL
558430	2015 AX_{185}	—	September 10, 2013	Haleakala	Pan-STARRS 1	·	1.8 km	MPC · JPL
558431	2015 AV_{187}	—	February 9, 2010	Mount Lemmon	Mount Lemmon Survey	·	1.2 km	MPC · JPL
558432	2015 AC_{190}	—	May 1, 2011	Haleakala	Pan-STARRS 1	·	2.4 km	MPC · JPL
558433	2015 AZ_{190}	—	April 2, 2006	Kitt Peak	Spacewatch	·	1.7 km	MPC · JPL
558434	2015 AU_{191}	—	December 21, 2014	Haleakala	Pan-STARRS 1	·	2.7 km	MPC · JPL
558435	2015 AB_{192}	—	October 26, 2008	Mount Lemmon	Mount Lemmon Survey	·	1.8 km	MPC · JPL
558436	2015 AV_{192}	—	December 21, 2014	Haleakala	Pan-STARRS 1	EOS	1.5 km	MPC · JPL
558437	2015 AX_{194}	—	January 28, 2004	Kitt Peak	Spacewatch	·	1.7 km	MPC · JPL
558438	2015 AC_{195}	—	January 14, 2015	Haleakala	Pan-STARRS 1	·	2.1 km	MPC · JPL
558439	2015 AR_{195}	—	December 18, 2009	Kitt Peak	Spacewatch	·	1.6 km	MPC · JPL
558440	2015 AU_{197}	—	November 17, 2008	Kitt Peak	Spacewatch	THM	1.8 km	MPC · JPL
558441	2015 AZ_{197}	—	October 3, 2013	Haleakala	Pan-STARRS 1	KOR	1.0 km	MPC · JPL
558442	2015 AS_{198}	—	November 21, 2009	Kitt Peak	Spacewatch	·	2.2 km	MPC · JPL
558443	2015 AD_{199}	—	November 19, 2014	Mount Lemmon	Mount Lemmon Survey	·	2.0 km	MPC · JPL
558444	2015 AJ_{201}	—	May 5, 2011	Mount Lemmon	Mount Lemmon Survey	EOS	1.9 km	MPC · JPL
558445	2015 AS_{201}	—	May 21, 2012	Mount Lemmon	Mount Lemmon Survey	·	1.9 km	MPC · JPL
558446	2015 AP_{202}	—	October 23, 2009	Kitt Peak	Spacewatch	·	1.6 km	MPC · JPL
558447	2015 AC_{203}	—	November 18, 2003	Kitt Peak	Spacewatch	·	1.9 km	MPC · JPL
558448	2015 AQ_{203}	—	July 23, 2011	Siding Spring	SSS	·	3.5 km	MPC · JPL
558449	2015 AO_{204}	—	October 16, 2003	Kitt Peak	Spacewatch	·	1.4 km	MPC · JPL
558450	2015 AU_{204}	—	October 4, 2013	Catalina	CSS	EOS	1.8 km	MPC · JPL
558451	2015 AE_{205}	—	January 31, 2006	Kitt Peak	Spacewatch	KOR	1.1 km	MPC · JPL
558452	2015 AH_{205}	—	September 28, 2008	Mount Lemmon	Mount Lemmon Survey	·	2.1 km	MPC · JPL
558453	2015 AS_{205}	—	December 21, 2014	Haleakala	Pan-STARRS 1	·	1.5 km	MPC · JPL
558454	2015 AT_{205}	—	September 29, 2005	Siding Spring	SSS	·	1.6 km	MPC · JPL
558455	2015 AT_{206}	—	December 21, 2014	Haleakala	Pan-STARRS 1	·	2.5 km	MPC · JPL
558456	2015 AU_{207}	—	September 22, 2014	Haleakala	Pan-STARRS 1	·	1.3 km	MPC · JPL
558457	2015 AB_{208}	—	September 18, 2014	Haleakala	Pan-STARRS 1	MAR	920 m	MPC · JPL
558458	2015 AM_{208}	—	February 1, 2012	Catalina	CSS	PHO	650 m	MPC · JPL
558459	2015 AQ_{208}	—	November 23, 2014	Haleakala	Pan-STARRS 1	TIR	2.6 km	MPC · JPL
558460	2015 AJ_{209}	—	February 12, 2011	Mount Lemmon	Mount Lemmon Survey	·	1.4 km	MPC · JPL
558461	2015 AT_{209}	—	January 13, 2011	Mount Lemmon	Mount Lemmon Survey	·	1.5 km	MPC · JPL
558462	2015 AC_{210}	—	December 29, 2014	Haleakala	Pan-STARRS 1	·	1.7 km	MPC · JPL
558463	2015 AR_{210}	—	March 6, 2008	Mount Lemmon	Mount Lemmon Survey	·	1.3 km	MPC · JPL
558464	2015 AD_{212}	—	August 12, 2013	Haleakala	Pan-STARRS 1	·	1.8 km	MPC · JPL
558465	2015 AV_{216}	—	January 12, 2010	Kitt Peak	Spacewatch	·	2.5 km	MPC · JPL
558466	2015 AM_{218}	—	October 27, 1995	Kitt Peak	Spacewatch	·	1.7 km	MPC · JPL
558467	2015 AE_{221}	—	January 15, 2015	Haleakala	Pan-STARRS 1	·	1.7 km	MPC · JPL
558468	2015 AJ_{222}	—	January 15, 2015	Haleakala	Pan-STARRS 1	·	1.5 km	MPC · JPL
558469	2015 AR_{222}	—	August 26, 2012	Haleakala	Pan-STARRS 1	·	2.5 km	MPC · JPL
558470	2015 AT_{223}	—	October 24, 2013	Mount Lemmon	Mount Lemmon Survey	·	2.6 km	MPC · JPL
558471	2015 AU_{223}	—	November 28, 2014	Haleakala	Pan-STARRS 1	EOS	1.8 km	MPC · JPL
558472	2015 AP_{224}	—	October 3, 2013	Mount Lemmon	Mount Lemmon Survey	(5651)	3.0 km	MPC · JPL
558473	2015 AS_{225}	—	October 28, 2008	Mount Lemmon	Mount Lemmon Survey	·	1.8 km	MPC · JPL
558474	2015 AV_{225}	—	October 28, 2013	Kitt Peak	Spacewatch	·	2.2 km	MPC · JPL
558475	2015 AW_{225}	—	March 10, 2010	Vail-Jarnac	Jarnac	·	3.9 km	MPC · JPL
558476	2015 AY_{226}	—	February 14, 2008	Mount Lemmon	Mount Lemmon Survey	·	810 m	MPC · JPL
558477	2015 AY_{228}	—	January 15, 2015	Haleakala	Pan-STARRS 1	·	1.4 km	MPC · JPL
558478	2015 AD_{229}	—	August 15, 2013	Haleakala	Pan-STARRS 1	V	460 m	MPC · JPL
558479	2015 AZ_{230}	—	April 30, 2012	Mount Lemmon	Mount Lemmon Survey	·	1.9 km	MPC · JPL
558480	2015 AU_{232}	—	October 15, 2002	Palomar	NEAT	·	3.0 km	MPC · JPL
558481	2015 AW_{232}	—	November 9, 2008	Kitt Peak	Spacewatch	·	1.6 km	MPC · JPL
558482	2015 AZ_{233}	—	September 6, 2008	Mount Lemmon	Mount Lemmon Survey	·	1.7 km	MPC · JPL
558483	2015 AU_{234}	—	October 18, 2007	Mount Lemmon	Mount Lemmon Survey	·	3.0 km	MPC · JPL
558484	2015 AB_{236}	—	December 2, 2014	Haleakala	Pan-STARRS 1	·	1.1 km	MPC · JPL
558485	2015 AX_{236}	—	January 15, 2015	Haleakala	Pan-STARRS 1	·	1.6 km	MPC · JPL
558486	2015 AD_{237}	—	March 13, 2010	Mount Lemmon	Mount Lemmon Survey	·	2.7 km	MPC · JPL
558487	2015 AJ_{237}	—	September 10, 2007	Kitt Peak	Spacewatch	EOS	1.6 km	MPC · JPL
558488	2015 AW_{237}	—	January 15, 2015	Haleakala	Pan-STARRS 1	·	1.8 km	MPC · JPL
558489	2015 AH_{238}	—	September 22, 2008	Catalina	CSS	·	2.2 km	MPC · JPL
558490	2015 AN_{239}	—	November 7, 2008	Mount Lemmon	Mount Lemmon Survey	·	1.7 km	MPC · JPL
558491	2015 AQ_{239}	—	January 15, 2015	Haleakala	Pan-STARRS 1	·	2.5 km	MPC · JPL
558492	2015 AQ_{240}	—	November 11, 2013	Kitt Peak	Spacewatch	·	1.9 km	MPC · JPL
558493	2015 AR_{240}	—	September 12, 2001	Kitt Peak	Spacewatch	·	2.6 km	MPC · JPL
558494	2015 AS_{240}	—	September 24, 2012	Mount Lemmon	Mount Lemmon Survey	·	2.4 km	MPC · JPL
558495	2015 AA_{241}	—	March 8, 2005	Mount Lemmon	Mount Lemmon Survey	·	1.9 km	MPC · JPL
558496	2015 AS_{241}	—	November 6, 2013	Haleakala	Pan-STARRS 1	·	1.9 km	MPC · JPL
558497	2015 AJ_{242}	—	November 26, 2013	Haleakala	Pan-STARRS 1	·	2.5 km	MPC · JPL
558498	2015 AS_{242}	—	April 6, 2011	Mount Lemmon	Mount Lemmon Survey	·	2.1 km	MPC · JPL
558499	2015 AV_{242}	—	November 9, 2013	Haleakala	Pan-STARRS 1	·	3.1 km	MPC · JPL
558500	2015 AA_{243}	—	March 21, 2004	Kitt Peak	Spacewatch	·	3.9 km	MPC · JPL

== 558501–558600 ==
back to top

Designation			Discovery			Properties		Ref
Permanent	Provisional	Named after	Date	Site	Discoverer(s)	Category	Diam.	Ref
558501	2015 AB_{244}	—	January 15, 2015	Haleakala	Pan-STARRS 1	·	3.1 km	MPC · JPL
558502	2015 AF_{244}	—	December 22, 2008	Mount Lemmon	Mount Lemmon Survey	·	1.9 km	MPC · JPL
558503	2015 AK_{246}	—	March 11, 2007	Bergisch Gladbach	W. Bickel	·	1.3 km	MPC · JPL
558504	2015 AK_{247}	—	August 26, 2013	Haleakala	Pan-STARRS 1	·	2.7 km	MPC · JPL
558505	2015 AO_{247}	—	March 1, 2011	Mount Lemmon	Mount Lemmon Survey	KOR	1.2 km	MPC · JPL
558506	2015 AQ_{247}	—	March 13, 2011	Kitt Peak	Spacewatch	KOR	1.2 km	MPC · JPL
558507	2015 AF_{248}	—	October 22, 2003	Apache Point	SDSS	·	1.8 km	MPC · JPL
558508	2015 AY_{249}	—	April 14, 2007	Kitt Peak	Spacewatch	526	1.8 km	MPC · JPL
558509	2015 AA_{250}	—	January 13, 2015	Haleakala	Pan-STARRS 1	·	2.4 km	MPC · JPL
558510	2015 AW_{250}	—	October 8, 2008	Mount Lemmon	Mount Lemmon Survey	EOS	1.5 km	MPC · JPL
558511	2015 AG_{252}	—	September 22, 2008	Mount Lemmon	Mount Lemmon Survey	KOR	1.3 km	MPC · JPL
558512	2015 AJ_{252}	—	March 12, 2004	Palomar	NEAT	·	3.3 km	MPC · JPL
558513	2015 AJ_{254}	—	January 23, 2006	Kitt Peak	Spacewatch	·	1.8 km	MPC · JPL
558514	2015 AW_{254}	—	October 26, 2014	Haleakala	Pan-STARRS 1	L5	10 km	MPC · JPL
558515	2015 AN_{255}	—	January 12, 2011	Kitt Peak	Spacewatch	·	2.0 km	MPC · JPL
558516	2015 AM_{256}	—	October 23, 2008	Mount Lemmon	Mount Lemmon Survey	·	1.7 km	MPC · JPL
558517	2015 AF_{257}	—	February 14, 2010	Mount Lemmon	Mount Lemmon Survey	EOS	1.5 km	MPC · JPL
558518	2015 AP_{258}	—	December 29, 2014	Haleakala	Pan-STARRS 1	EOS	1.8 km	MPC · JPL
558519	2015 AA_{260}	—	August 12, 2013	Kitt Peak	Spacewatch	·	1.4 km	MPC · JPL
558520	2015 AC_{260}	—	September 3, 2013	Haleakala	Pan-STARRS 1	TIR	2.0 km	MPC · JPL
558521	2015 AR_{260}	—	January 15, 2015	Haleakala	Pan-STARRS 1	·	1.5 km	MPC · JPL
558522	2015 AT_{260}	—	November 18, 2003	Kitt Peak	Spacewatch	·	1.9 km	MPC · JPL
558523	2015 AW_{260}	—	September 12, 2007	Kitt Peak	Spacewatch	EOS	1.5 km	MPC · JPL
558524	2015 AG_{261}	—	November 20, 2003	Palomar	NEAT	·	1.8 km	MPC · JPL
558525	2015 AY_{261}	—	April 2, 2011	Kitt Peak	Spacewatch	·	1.8 km	MPC · JPL
558526	2015 AF_{262}	—	October 12, 2007	Mount Lemmon	Mount Lemmon Survey	·	3.2 km	MPC · JPL
558527	2015 AM_{262}	—	October 12, 2007	Mount Lemmon	Mount Lemmon Survey	·	2.6 km	MPC · JPL
558528	2015 AG_{263}	—	January 1, 2009	Mount Lemmon	Mount Lemmon Survey	·	2.9 km	MPC · JPL
558529	2015 AS_{263}	—	September 5, 2013	Kitt Peak	Spacewatch	·	2.7 km	MPC · JPL
558530	2015 AA_{264}	—	September 26, 2012	Mount Lemmon	Mount Lemmon Survey	EOS	1.7 km	MPC · JPL
558531	2015 AG_{264}	—	November 25, 2013	XuYi	PMO NEO Survey Program	·	2.6 km	MPC · JPL
558532	2015 AX_{264}	—	October 3, 2013	Haleakala	Pan-STARRS 1	·	2.7 km	MPC · JPL
558533	2015 AG_{265}	—	October 22, 2013	Catalina	CSS	TIR	2.8 km	MPC · JPL
558534	2015 AJ_{266}	—	August 24, 2003	Cerro Tololo	Deep Ecliptic Survey	KOR	1.3 km	MPC · JPL
558535	2015 AV_{270}	—	December 29, 2014	Mount Lemmon	Mount Lemmon Survey	HOF	2.2 km	MPC · JPL
558536	2015 AO_{273}	—	October 3, 2013	Haleakala	Pan-STARRS 1	VER	2.1 km	MPC · JPL
558537	2015 AR_{274}	—	January 14, 2015	Haleakala	Pan-STARRS 1	·	1.7 km	MPC · JPL
558538	2015 AH_{277}	—	September 25, 2008	Kitt Peak	Spacewatch	·	1.5 km	MPC · JPL
558539	2015 AT_{278}	—	September 12, 2007	Mount Lemmon	Mount Lemmon Survey	·	2.3 km	MPC · JPL
558540	2015 AZ_{278}	—	January 15, 2015	Haleakala	Pan-STARRS 1	·	1.6 km	MPC · JPL
558541	2015 AC_{279}	—	February 16, 2004	Kitt Peak	Spacewatch	·	3.5 km	MPC · JPL
558542	2015 AN_{279}	—	October 9, 2007	Kitt Peak	Spacewatch	·	3.0 km	MPC · JPL
558543	2015 AX_{281}	—	November 2, 2011	Kitt Peak	Spacewatch	H	470 m	MPC · JPL
558544	2015 AK_{282}	—	November 30, 2011	Mount Lemmon	Mount Lemmon Survey	H	450 m	MPC · JPL
558545	2015 AR_{282}	—	January 12, 2015	Haleakala	Pan-STARRS 1	H	470 m	MPC · JPL
558546	2015 AK_{285}	—	March 12, 2010	Kitt Peak	Spacewatch	·	2.0 km	MPC · JPL
558547	2015 AC_{286}	—	November 9, 2008	Mount Lemmon	Mount Lemmon Survey	·	1.8 km	MPC · JPL
558548	2015 AG_{286}	—	November 24, 2008	Kitt Peak	Spacewatch	·	1.5 km	MPC · JPL
558549	2015 AQ_{286}	—	February 18, 2010	Kitt Peak	Spacewatch	·	1.6 km	MPC · JPL
558550	2015 AW_{286}	—	November 5, 2002	Palomar	NEAT	EOS	1.9 km	MPC · JPL
558551	2015 AM_{287}	—	November 30, 2014	Haleakala	Pan-STARRS 1	EUN	1.1 km	MPC · JPL
558552	2015 AZ_{288}	—	December 15, 2006	Kitt Peak	Spacewatch	·	1.1 km	MPC · JPL
558553	2015 AD_{289}	—	March 2, 2011	Kitt Peak	Spacewatch	·	2.2 km	MPC · JPL
558554	2015 AO_{291}	—	May 26, 2006	Mount Lemmon	Mount Lemmon Survey	·	3.0 km	MPC · JPL
558555	2015 AV_{292}	—	October 22, 2008	Kitt Peak	Spacewatch	·	2.0 km	MPC · JPL
558556	2015 AZ_{292}	—	July 18, 2013	Haleakala	Pan-STARRS 1	EOS	2.1 km	MPC · JPL
558557	2015 AB_{297}	—	April 11, 2016	Haleakala	Pan-STARRS 1	·	1.6 km	MPC · JPL
558558	2015 AJ_{298}	—	September 22, 2003	Kitt Peak	Spacewatch	·	1.8 km	MPC · JPL
558559	2015 AS_{298}	—	January 15, 2015	Haleakala	Pan-STARRS 1	·	1.6 km	MPC · JPL
558560	2015 AB_{300}	—	January 14, 2015	Haleakala	Pan-STARRS 1	·	2.5 km	MPC · JPL
558561	2015 AA_{301}	—	January 15, 2015	Haleakala	Pan-STARRS 1	·	1.5 km	MPC · JPL
558562	2015 AK_{302}	—	January 13, 2015	Haleakala	Pan-STARRS 1	·	2.4 km	MPC · JPL
558563	2015 BX	—	September 28, 2008	Mount Lemmon	Mount Lemmon Survey	·	2.1 km	MPC · JPL
558564	2015 BY	—	February 10, 2010	Kitt Peak	Spacewatch	·	2.3 km	MPC · JPL
558565	2015 BH_{5}	—	April 29, 2011	Mount Lemmon	Mount Lemmon Survey	EOS	2.5 km	MPC · JPL
558566	2015 BW_{5}	—	January 16, 2015	Kitt Peak	Spacewatch	·	1.8 km	MPC · JPL
558567	2015 BY_{5}	—	January 16, 2015	Kitt Peak	Spacewatch	HYG	2.6 km	MPC · JPL
558568	2015 BM_{6}	—	October 24, 2005	Mauna Kea	A. Boattini	·	2.8 km	MPC · JPL
558569	2015 BN_{6}	—	July 21, 2001	Ondřejov	P. Pravec, L. Kotková	TIR	3.0 km	MPC · JPL
558570	2015 BQ_{6}	—	September 13, 2007	Mount Lemmon	Mount Lemmon Survey	·	2.1 km	MPC · JPL
558571	2015 BR_{8}	—	March 23, 2010	ESA OGS	ESA OGS	·	2.3 km	MPC · JPL
558572	2015 BZ_{8}	—	September 6, 2008	Mount Lemmon	Mount Lemmon Survey	KOR	1.2 km	MPC · JPL
558573	2015 BC_{9}	—	February 1, 2006	Kitt Peak	Spacewatch	·	1.8 km	MPC · JPL
558574	2015 BN_{10}	—	June 3, 2011	Mount Lemmon	Mount Lemmon Survey	·	3.1 km	MPC · JPL
558575	2015 BO_{10}	—	December 22, 2003	Kitt Peak	Spacewatch	·	2.7 km	MPC · JPL
558576	2015 BE_{11}	—	December 4, 2008	Catalina	CSS	EOS	2.3 km	MPC · JPL
558577	2015 BG_{11}	—	November 8, 2008	Mount Lemmon	Mount Lemmon Survey	HYG	2.3 km	MPC · JPL
558578	2015 BE_{12}	—	March 9, 2005	Kitt Peak	Spacewatch	·	2.8 km	MPC · JPL
558579	2015 BQ_{12}	—	April 27, 2012	Haleakala	Pan-STARRS 1	·	1.4 km	MPC · JPL
558580	2015 BD_{13}	—	January 16, 2015	Mount Lemmon	Mount Lemmon Survey	·	2.8 km	MPC · JPL
558581	2015 BD_{14}	—	March 13, 2011	Mount Lemmon	Mount Lemmon Survey	·	2.7 km	MPC · JPL
558582	2015 BF_{14}	—	December 16, 2014	Haleakala	Pan-STARRS 1	V	520 m	MPC · JPL
558583	2015 BC_{15}	—	October 2, 2013	Palomar	Palomar Transient Factory	·	2.2 km	MPC · JPL
558584	2015 BK_{15}	—	January 16, 2015	Mount Lemmon	Mount Lemmon Survey	·	1.9 km	MPC · JPL
558585	2015 BW_{15}	—	December 29, 2003	Kitt Peak	Spacewatch	EOS	2.1 km	MPC · JPL
558586	2015 BZ_{16}	—	October 3, 2013	Mount Lemmon	Mount Lemmon Survey	THM	1.8 km	MPC · JPL
558587	2015 BQ_{17}	—	September 10, 2007	Catalina	CSS	·	3.5 km	MPC · JPL
558588	2015 BV_{17}	—	November 30, 2014	Haleakala	Pan-STARRS 1	·	3.7 km	MPC · JPL
558589	2015 BN_{20}	—	November 2, 2007	Mount Lemmon	Mount Lemmon Survey	VER	2.5 km	MPC · JPL
558590	2015 BU_{20}	—	September 12, 2007	Mount Lemmon	Mount Lemmon Survey	·	3.0 km	MPC · JPL
558591	2015 BV_{21}	—	July 21, 2006	Mount Lemmon	Mount Lemmon Survey	EOS	1.7 km	MPC · JPL
558592	2015 BW_{22}	—	December 29, 2008	Mount Lemmon	Mount Lemmon Survey	·	2.6 km	MPC · JPL
558593	2015 BO_{23}	—	January 16, 2015	Haleakala	Pan-STARRS 1	·	2.7 km	MPC · JPL
558594	2015 BV_{23}	—	November 1, 2008	Mount Lemmon	Mount Lemmon Survey	·	2.8 km	MPC · JPL
558595	2015 BC_{24}	—	July 29, 2003	Campo Imperatore	CINEOS	·	2.4 km	MPC · JPL
558596	2015 BK_{24}	—	January 16, 2015	Haleakala	Pan-STARRS 1	·	2.4 km	MPC · JPL
558597	2015 BG_{25}	—	February 26, 2004	Socorro	LINEAR	·	2.7 km	MPC · JPL
558598	2015 BD_{26}	—	November 27, 2013	Haleakala	Pan-STARRS 1	·	2.3 km	MPC · JPL
558599	2015 BU_{27}	—	September 14, 2012	Catalina	CSS	EOS	2.4 km	MPC · JPL
558600	2015 BJ_{28}	—	January 16, 2015	Haleakala	Pan-STARRS 1	·	1.8 km	MPC · JPL

== 558601–558700 ==
back to top

Designation			Discovery			Properties		Ref
Permanent	Provisional	Named after	Date	Site	Discoverer(s)	Category	Diam.	Ref
558601	2015 BQ_{28}	—	March 16, 2004	Kitt Peak	Spacewatch	·	4.3 km	MPC · JPL
558602	2015 BD_{29}	—	August 29, 2006	Kitt Peak	Spacewatch	EOS	2.2 km	MPC · JPL
558603	2015 BU_{29}	—	October 15, 2007	Mount Lemmon	Mount Lemmon Survey	·	2.4 km	MPC · JPL
558604	2015 BZ_{29}	—	February 13, 2010	Mount Lemmon	Mount Lemmon Survey	EOS	1.7 km	MPC · JPL
558605	2015 BC_{30}	—	December 22, 2008	Kitt Peak	Spacewatch	EOS	2.1 km	MPC · JPL
558606	2015 BL_{30}	—	September 13, 2007	Mount Lemmon	Mount Lemmon Survey	·	2.1 km	MPC · JPL
558607	2015 BC_{32}	—	September 6, 2008	Kitt Peak	Spacewatch	AST	1.3 km	MPC · JPL
558608	2015 BO_{32}	—	November 11, 2013	Mount Lemmon	Mount Lemmon Survey	·	2.5 km	MPC · JPL
558609	2015 BL_{33}	—	January 16, 2015	Haleakala	Pan-STARRS 1	·	2.2 km	MPC · JPL
558610	2015 BO_{33}	—	May 22, 2011	Mount Lemmon	Mount Lemmon Survey	EOS	1.7 km	MPC · JPL
558611	2015 BC_{34}	—	April 21, 2009	Mount Lemmon	Mount Lemmon Survey	·	580 m	MPC · JPL
558612	2015 BF_{34}	—	December 19, 2009	Mount Lemmon	Mount Lemmon Survey	KOR	1.1 km	MPC · JPL
558613	2015 BM_{34}	—	September 14, 2013	Haleakala	Pan-STARRS 1	EOS	1.6 km	MPC · JPL
558614	2015 BK_{35}	—	November 28, 2013	Mount Lemmon	Mount Lemmon Survey	·	2.7 km	MPC · JPL
558615	2015 BL_{36}	—	January 16, 2009	Kitt Peak	Spacewatch	ELF	3.4 km	MPC · JPL
558616	2015 BK_{37}	—	December 6, 2010	Kitt Peak	Spacewatch	MAR	1.1 km	MPC · JPL
558617	2015 BP_{37}	—	May 7, 2006	Mount Lemmon	Mount Lemmon Survey	·	2.2 km	MPC · JPL
558618	2015 BS_{37}	—	October 23, 2013	Haleakala	Pan-STARRS 1	VER	3.0 km	MPC · JPL
558619	2015 BF_{38}	—	March 4, 2005	Mount Lemmon	Mount Lemmon Survey	·	2.1 km	MPC · JPL
558620	2015 BB_{39}	—	March 11, 2011	Mount Lemmon	Mount Lemmon Survey	·	1.7 km	MPC · JPL
558621	2015 BO_{39}	—	December 5, 2008	Mount Lemmon	Mount Lemmon Survey	·	3.6 km	MPC · JPL
558622	2015 BB_{40}	—	September 1, 2013	Mount Lemmon	Mount Lemmon Survey	·	580 m	MPC · JPL
558623	2015 BJ_{40}	—	November 18, 2009	Kitt Peak	Spacewatch	·	1.6 km	MPC · JPL
558624	2015 BM_{40}	—	September 10, 2007	Kitt Peak	Spacewatch	EOS	1.7 km	MPC · JPL
558625	2015 BQ_{40}	—	August 23, 2001	Socorro	LINEAR	·	3.8 km	MPC · JPL
558626	2015 BC_{42}	—	February 11, 2004	Kitt Peak	Spacewatch	LIX	3.0 km	MPC · JPL
558627	2015 BL_{43}	—	December 15, 2014	Mount Lemmon	Mount Lemmon Survey	·	2.3 km	MPC · JPL
558628	2015 BH_{44}	—	December 12, 2014	Mayhill-ISON	L. Elenin	·	1.5 km	MPC · JPL
558629	2015 BY_{44}	—	November 4, 2014	Mount Lemmon	Mount Lemmon Survey	·	3.0 km	MPC · JPL
558630	2015 BZ_{44}	—	November 16, 2009	Mount Lemmon	Mount Lemmon Survey	·	1.7 km	MPC · JPL
558631	2015 BA_{45}	—	February 15, 2010	Kitt Peak	Spacewatch	·	2.8 km	MPC · JPL
558632	2015 BH_{45}	—	October 26, 2009	Kitt Peak	Spacewatch	·	1.6 km	MPC · JPL
558633	2015 BK_{47}	—	February 21, 2007	Mount Lemmon	Mount Lemmon Survey	·	1.5 km	MPC · JPL
558634	2015 BS_{47}	—	September 16, 2009	Kitt Peak	Spacewatch	·	1.9 km	MPC · JPL
558635	2015 BO_{48}	—	September 27, 2000	Kitt Peak	Spacewatch	·	1.6 km	MPC · JPL
558636	2015 BF_{49}	—	January 17, 2015	Haleakala	Pan-STARRS 1	·	2.7 km	MPC · JPL
558637	2015 BL_{49}	—	January 12, 2011	Kitt Peak	Spacewatch	·	1.9 km	MPC · JPL
558638	2015 BN_{50}	—	January 17, 2015	Haleakala	Pan-STARRS 1	TIR	2.4 km	MPC · JPL
558639	2015 BU_{50}	—	October 1, 2008	Kitt Peak	Spacewatch	·	1.8 km	MPC · JPL
558640	2015 BZ_{50}	—	January 17, 2015	Haleakala	Pan-STARRS 1	BRA	1.3 km	MPC · JPL
558641	2015 BT_{51}	—	August 17, 2009	Catalina	CSS	JUN	1.1 km	MPC · JPL
558642	2015 BU_{51}	—	September 1, 2005	Anderson Mesa	LONEOS	MAR	1.3 km	MPC · JPL
558643	2015 BM_{52}	—	September 20, 2003	Kitt Peak	Spacewatch	·	2.2 km	MPC · JPL
558644	2015 BR_{52}	—	June 8, 2012	Mount Lemmon	Mount Lemmon Survey	NAE	2.5 km	MPC · JPL
558645	2015 BX_{52}	—	March 12, 2005	Kitt Peak	Spacewatch	·	2.3 km	MPC · JPL
558646	2015 BK_{53}	—	September 28, 2009	Mount Lemmon	Mount Lemmon Survey	·	2.1 km	MPC · JPL
558647	2015 BR_{56}	—	September 4, 2008	Kitt Peak	Spacewatch	·	1.6 km	MPC · JPL
558648	2015 BV_{56}	—	April 8, 2006	Kitt Peak	Spacewatch	·	1.6 km	MPC · JPL
558649	2015 BZ_{56}	—	September 25, 2009	Kitt Peak	Spacewatch	·	1.5 km	MPC · JPL
558650	2015 BE_{57}	—	January 23, 2004	Socorro	LINEAR	·	4.9 km	MPC · JPL
558651	2015 BS_{57}	—	January 17, 2015	Haleakala	Pan-STARRS 1	·	3.1 km	MPC · JPL
558652	2015 BU_{58}	—	November 8, 2008	Mount Lemmon	Mount Lemmon Survey	EOS	1.6 km	MPC · JPL
558653	2015 BX_{58}	—	January 17, 2015	Haleakala	Pan-STARRS 1	·	2.5 km	MPC · JPL
558654	2015 BH_{59}	—	January 17, 2015	Haleakala	Pan-STARRS 1	EOS	1.4 km	MPC · JPL
558655	2015 BJ_{59}	—	November 21, 2008	Kitt Peak	Spacewatch	·	1.6 km	MPC · JPL
558656	2015 BW_{59}	—	October 26, 2008	Mount Lemmon	Mount Lemmon Survey	HYG	2.9 km	MPC · JPL
558657	2015 BR_{60}	—	May 27, 2012	Mount Lemmon	Mount Lemmon Survey	·	3.8 km	MPC · JPL
558658	2015 BY_{60}	—	April 6, 2011	Mount Lemmon	Mount Lemmon Survey	EOS	1.7 km	MPC · JPL
558659	2015 BC_{61}	—	October 26, 2008	Kitt Peak	Spacewatch	·	1.3 km	MPC · JPL
558660	2015 BN_{61}	—	October 3, 2004	Palomar	NEAT	·	1.8 km	MPC · JPL
558661	2015 BR_{61}	—	January 2, 2009	Mount Lemmon	Mount Lemmon Survey	·	2.3 km	MPC · JPL
558662	2015 BT_{61}	—	April 14, 2005	Catalina	CSS	·	2.3 km	MPC · JPL
558663	2015 BC_{62}	—	January 17, 2015	Haleakala	Pan-STARRS 1	EOS	1.4 km	MPC · JPL
558664	2015 BM_{62}	—	January 17, 2015	Haleakala	Pan-STARRS 1	·	2.8 km	MPC · JPL
558665	2015 BY_{62}	—	January 17, 2015	Haleakala	Pan-STARRS 1	·	2.3 km	MPC · JPL
558666	2015 BR_{63}	—	January 17, 2015	Haleakala	Pan-STARRS 1	·	3.1 km	MPC · JPL
558667	2015 BL_{64}	—	December 22, 2008	Kitt Peak	Spacewatch	EOS	1.8 km	MPC · JPL
558668	2015 BT_{65}	—	October 14, 2007	Mount Lemmon	Mount Lemmon Survey	·	2.6 km	MPC · JPL
558669	2015 BW_{66}	—	November 27, 2013	Haleakala	Pan-STARRS 1	·	2.5 km	MPC · JPL
558670	2015 BW_{68}	—	September 23, 2008	Kitt Peak	Spacewatch	EOS	1.3 km	MPC · JPL
558671	2015 BD_{69}	—	April 6, 2005	Mount Lemmon	Mount Lemmon Survey	EOS	1.7 km	MPC · JPL
558672	2015 BJ_{69}	—	October 22, 2003	Apache Point	SDSS Collaboration	NAE	1.5 km	MPC · JPL
558673	2015 BK_{69}	—	September 23, 2001	Kitt Peak	Spacewatch	VER	2.5 km	MPC · JPL
558674	2015 BX_{69}	—	November 1, 2008	Mount Lemmon	Mount Lemmon Survey	·	2.1 km	MPC · JPL
558675	2015 BE_{70}	—	January 17, 2015	Haleakala	Pan-STARRS 1	·	2.7 km	MPC · JPL
558676	2015 BY_{70}	—	September 9, 2007	Kitt Peak	Spacewatch	EOS	1.5 km	MPC · JPL
558677	2015 BH_{71}	—	January 17, 2015	Haleakala	Pan-STARRS 1	TEL	1.1 km	MPC · JPL
558678	2015 BR_{71}	—	November 2, 2013	Mount Lemmon	Mount Lemmon Survey	·	2.5 km	MPC · JPL
558679	2015 BU_{71}	—	August 14, 2012	Haleakala	Pan-STARRS 1	·	3.6 km	MPC · JPL
558680	2015 BZ_{71}	—	November 4, 2013	Haleakala	Pan-STARRS 1	·	2.4 km	MPC · JPL
558681	2015 BN_{72}	—	August 10, 2007	Kitt Peak	Spacewatch	·	1.9 km	MPC · JPL
558682	2015 BK_{73}	—	October 8, 2008	Kitt Peak	Spacewatch	KOR	1.1 km	MPC · JPL
558683	2015 BV_{73}	—	September 13, 2007	Kitt Peak	Spacewatch	·	2.5 km	MPC · JPL
558684	2015 BH_{74}	—	December 14, 2004	Calvin-Rehoboth	L. A. Molnar	·	2.4 km	MPC · JPL
558685	2015 BZ_{74}	—	January 17, 2015	Haleakala	Pan-STARRS 1	·	2.8 km	MPC · JPL
558686	2015 BU_{75}	—	March 12, 2010	Kitt Peak	Spacewatch	VER	2.2 km	MPC · JPL
558687	2015 BB_{76}	—	October 23, 2013	Haleakala	Pan-STARRS 1	·	2.7 km	MPC · JPL
558688	2015 BU_{76}	—	January 17, 2015	Haleakala	Pan-STARRS 1	EOS	1.8 km	MPC · JPL
558689	2015 BB_{77}	—	August 9, 2012	Haleakala	Pan-STARRS 1	·	2.4 km	MPC · JPL
558690	2015 BD_{77}	—	September 13, 2013	Mount Lemmon	Mount Lemmon Survey	·	1.4 km	MPC · JPL
558691	2015 BZ_{77}	—	January 18, 2015	ESA OGS	ESA OGS	EOS	1.8 km	MPC · JPL
558692	2015 BL_{78}	—	September 29, 2008	Kitt Peak	Spacewatch	·	3.4 km	MPC · JPL
558693	2015 BR_{78}	—	June 29, 2001	Kitt Peak	Spacewatch	·	1.3 km	MPC · JPL
558694	2015 BK_{80}	—	October 3, 2013	Haleakala	Pan-STARRS 1	·	1.8 km	MPC · JPL
558695	2015 BL_{80}	—	December 26, 2014	Haleakala	Pan-STARRS 1	·	2.0 km	MPC · JPL
558696	2015 BZ_{80}	—	September 24, 2008	Kitt Peak	Spacewatch	·	1.7 km	MPC · JPL
558697	2015 BR_{82}	—	January 18, 2015	Mount Lemmon	Mount Lemmon Survey	·	2.3 km	MPC · JPL
558698	2015 BJ_{83}	—	November 26, 2014	Mount Lemmon	Mount Lemmon Survey	·	3.3 km	MPC · JPL
558699	2015 BP_{83}	—	October 2, 2013	Haleakala	Pan-STARRS 1	HYG	2.2 km	MPC · JPL
558700	2015 BQ_{83}	—	February 15, 2010	Catalina	CSS	·	1.8 km	MPC · JPL

== 558701–558800 ==
back to top

Designation			Discovery			Properties		Ref
Permanent	Provisional	Named after	Date	Site	Discoverer(s)	Category	Diam.	Ref
558701	2015 BS_{83}	—	December 29, 2014	Haleakala	Pan-STARRS 1	615	1.3 km	MPC · JPL
558702	2015 BU_{83}	—	December 15, 2004	Kitt Peak	Spacewatch	·	1.7 km	MPC · JPL
558703	2015 BA_{86}	—	March 15, 2004	Kitt Peak	Spacewatch	·	2.8 km	MPC · JPL
558704	2015 BO_{86}	—	January 18, 2015	Haleakala	Pan-STARRS 1	·	2.9 km	MPC · JPL
558705	2015 BO_{87}	—	August 13, 2012	Haleakala	Pan-STARRS 1	·	3.3 km	MPC · JPL
558706	2015 BB_{89}	—	August 12, 2006	Palomar	NEAT	·	4.0 km	MPC · JPL
558707	2015 BF_{91}	—	November 6, 2008	Mount Lemmon	Mount Lemmon Survey	·	2.3 km	MPC · JPL
558708	2015 BS_{92}	—	August 25, 2011	Siding Spring	SSS	·	460 m	MPC · JPL
558709	2015 BT_{93}	—	September 21, 2007	Kitt Peak	Spacewatch	·	3.5 km	MPC · JPL
558710	2015 BW_{94}	—	December 21, 2014	Haleakala	Pan-STARRS 1	·	2.8 km	MPC · JPL
558711	2015 BY_{94}	—	November 7, 2008	Mount Lemmon	Mount Lemmon Survey	EOS	1.9 km	MPC · JPL
558712	2015 BZ_{94}	—	October 23, 2003	Apache Point	SDSS	·	1.7 km	MPC · JPL
558713	2015 BW_{96}	—	February 19, 2010	Mount Lemmon	Mount Lemmon Survey	·	2.6 km	MPC · JPL
558714	2015 BF_{99}	—	January 16, 2015	Mount Lemmon	Mount Lemmon Survey	·	2.7 km	MPC · JPL
558715	2015 BM_{99}	—	May 21, 2011	Mount Lemmon	Mount Lemmon Survey	·	2.8 km	MPC · JPL
558716	2015 BD_{100}	—	January 16, 2015	Mount Lemmon	Mount Lemmon Survey	·	2.3 km	MPC · JPL
558717	2015 BA_{101}	—	August 14, 2001	Haleakala	NEAT	EOS	1.9 km	MPC · JPL
558718	2015 BF_{102}	—	December 29, 2008	Mount Lemmon	Mount Lemmon Survey	·	2.6 km	MPC · JPL
558719	2015 BS_{102}	—	October 12, 2013	Kitt Peak	Spacewatch	·	1.1 km	MPC · JPL
558720	2015 BT_{102}	—	November 11, 2007	Mount Lemmon	Mount Lemmon Survey	·	2.2 km	MPC · JPL
558721	2015 BX_{102}	—	October 24, 2013	Mount Lemmon	Mount Lemmon Survey	·	1.9 km	MPC · JPL
558722	2015 BO_{104}	—	October 26, 2008	Kitt Peak	Spacewatch	·	2.5 km	MPC · JPL
558723	2015 BP_{104}	—	January 19, 2004	Kitt Peak	Spacewatch	·	2.9 km	MPC · JPL
558724	2015 BL_{105}	—	November 20, 2008	Kitt Peak	Spacewatch	·	1.9 km	MPC · JPL
558725	2015 BX_{106}	—	December 25, 2013	Haleakala	Pan-STARRS 1	URS	3.0 km	MPC · JPL
558726	2015 BU_{107}	—	January 20, 2015	Haleakala	Pan-STARRS 1	·	3.5 km	MPC · JPL
558727	2015 BY_{107}	—	November 24, 2009	Kitt Peak	Spacewatch	KOR	1.6 km	MPC · JPL
558728	2015 BG_{108}	—	December 11, 2014	Mount Lemmon	Mount Lemmon Survey	TEL	1.2 km	MPC · JPL
558729	2015 BN_{108}	—	March 12, 2011	Mount Lemmon	Mount Lemmon Survey	·	1.9 km	MPC · JPL
558730	2015 BB_{109}	—	November 24, 2013	Haleakala	Pan-STARRS 1	(43176)	4.0 km	MPC · JPL
558731	2015 BU_{109}	—	February 11, 2004	Kitt Peak	Spacewatch	·	3.0 km	MPC · JPL
558732	2015 BD_{110}	—	November 4, 2013	Haleakala	Pan-STARRS 1	·	3.0 km	MPC · JPL
558733	2015 BK_{110}	—	March 29, 2011	Mount Lemmon	Mount Lemmon Survey	·	1.6 km	MPC · JPL
558734	2015 BM_{110}	—	December 29, 2014	Haleakala	Pan-STARRS 1	EOS	1.7 km	MPC · JPL
558735	2015 BO_{110}	—	September 4, 2003	Kitt Peak	Spacewatch	·	1.5 km	MPC · JPL
558736	2015 BN_{111}	—	April 4, 2008	Mount Lemmon	Mount Lemmon Survey	L5	7.4 km	MPC · JPL
558737	2015 BV_{111}	—	January 17, 2015	Haleakala	Pan-STARRS 1	·	1.5 km	MPC · JPL
558738	2015 BD_{114}	—	January 17, 2015	Mount Lemmon	Mount Lemmon Survey	NAE	2.0 km	MPC · JPL
558739	2015 BO_{114}	—	October 5, 2013	Haleakala	Pan-STARRS 1	GEF	1.2 km	MPC · JPL
558740	2015 BV_{114}	—	December 30, 2005	Kitt Peak	Spacewatch	·	1.4 km	MPC · JPL
558741	2015 BT_{115}	—	March 13, 2005	Kitt Peak	Spacewatch	·	2.1 km	MPC · JPL
558742	2015 BV_{116}	—	December 1, 2003	Kitt Peak	Spacewatch	·	2.5 km	MPC · JPL
558743	2015 BM_{117}	—	November 19, 2008	Mount Lemmon	Mount Lemmon Survey	(31811)	3.2 km	MPC · JPL
558744	2015 BN_{117}	—	February 9, 2005	Mount Lemmon	Mount Lemmon Survey	·	1.8 km	MPC · JPL
558745	2015 BG_{119}	—	November 6, 2008	Kitt Peak	Spacewatch	·	1.8 km	MPC · JPL
558746	2015 BH_{119}	—	March 14, 2010	Kitt Peak	Spacewatch	·	1.9 km	MPC · JPL
558747	2015 BM_{119}	—	February 9, 2005	Kitt Peak	Spacewatch	·	2.4 km	MPC · JPL
558748	2015 BQ_{119}	—	December 28, 2008	Dauban	C. Rinner, Kugel, F.	EOS	2.4 km	MPC · JPL
558749	2015 BO_{121}	—	November 10, 2013	Mount Lemmon	Mount Lemmon Survey	·	1.4 km	MPC · JPL
558750	2015 BR_{121}	—	December 26, 2014	Haleakala	Pan-STARRS 1	·	2.6 km	MPC · JPL
558751	2015 BC_{122}	—	October 23, 2013	Mount Lemmon	Mount Lemmon Survey	KOR	1.1 km	MPC · JPL
558752	2015 BZ_{123}	—	January 11, 2010	Kitt Peak	Spacewatch	·	1.6 km	MPC · JPL
558753	2015 BJ_{124}	—	January 17, 2015	Haleakala	Pan-STARRS 1	·	2.4 km	MPC · JPL
558754	2015 BC_{128}	—	November 11, 2013	Mount Lemmon	Mount Lemmon Survey	EOS	1.7 km	MPC · JPL
558755	2015 BR_{128}	—	August 15, 2004	Campo Imperatore	CINEOS	·	1.7 km	MPC · JPL
558756	2015 BH_{130}	—	January 16, 2015	Mount Lemmon	Mount Lemmon Survey	·	1.8 km	MPC · JPL
558757	2015 BZ_{132}	—	February 17, 2004	Kitt Peak	Spacewatch	·	2.9 km	MPC · JPL
558758	2015 BW_{133}	—	January 17, 2015	Haleakala	Pan-STARRS 1	·	3.0 km	MPC · JPL
558759	2015 BD_{134}	—	June 16, 2007	Kitt Peak	Spacewatch	·	2.7 km	MPC · JPL
558760	2015 BE_{134}	—	January 17, 2015	Haleakala	Pan-STARRS 1	EOS	1.4 km	MPC · JPL
558761	2015 BN_{134}	—	January 17, 2015	Haleakala	Pan-STARRS 1	·	2.4 km	MPC · JPL
558762	2015 BW_{134}	—	January 17, 2015	Haleakala	Pan-STARRS 1	·	2.3 km	MPC · JPL
558763	2015 BK_{135}	—	February 13, 2010	Mount Lemmon	Mount Lemmon Survey	EOS	1.3 km	MPC · JPL
558764	2015 BN_{135}	—	August 17, 2012	Haleakala	Pan-STARRS 1	·	2.9 km	MPC · JPL
558765	2015 BH_{137}	—	September 11, 2007	Mount Lemmon	Mount Lemmon Survey	EOS	1.7 km	MPC · JPL
558766	2015 BL_{138}	—	April 12, 2000	Kitt Peak	Spacewatch	·	1.8 km	MPC · JPL
558767	2015 BA_{140}	—	October 5, 2002	Palomar	NEAT	·	3.0 km	MPC · JPL
558768	2015 BU_{140}	—	September 23, 2008	Mount Lemmon	Mount Lemmon Survey	·	1.7 km	MPC · JPL
558769	2015 BD_{143}	—	May 1, 2011	Haleakala	Pan-STARRS 1	·	1.7 km	MPC · JPL
558770	2015 BM_{143}	—	January 17, 2015	Haleakala	Pan-STARRS 1	EOS	1.6 km	MPC · JPL
558771	2015 BO_{143}	—	August 11, 2002	Cerro Tololo	Deep Ecliptic Survey	TEL	1.2 km	MPC · JPL
558772	2015 BP_{144}	—	December 19, 2004	Mount Lemmon	Mount Lemmon Survey	·	2.1 km	MPC · JPL
558773	2015 BH_{145}	—	July 14, 2013	Haleakala	Pan-STARRS 1	·	2.3 km	MPC · JPL
558774	2015 BM_{145}	—	November 20, 2003	Kitt Peak	Spacewatch	·	1.2 km	MPC · JPL
558775	2015 BR_{146}	—	October 3, 2002	Palomar	NEAT	·	3.0 km	MPC · JPL
558776	2015 BN_{148}	—	November 19, 2008	Mount Lemmon	Mount Lemmon Survey	·	1.7 km	MPC · JPL
558777	2015 BO_{148}	—	March 10, 2005	Mount Lemmon	Mount Lemmon Survey	·	1.9 km	MPC · JPL
558778	2015 BY_{150}	—	January 17, 2015	Haleakala	Pan-STARRS 1	·	2.5 km	MPC · JPL
558779	2015 BK_{151}	—	October 24, 2013	Mount Lemmon	Mount Lemmon Survey	·	1.9 km	MPC · JPL
558780	2015 BV_{155}	—	September 13, 2012	Mount Lemmon	Mount Lemmon Survey	·	1.5 km	MPC · JPL
558781	2015 BG_{156}	—	November 27, 2013	Haleakala	Pan-STARRS 1	·	2.7 km	MPC · JPL
558782	2015 BQ_{157}	—	September 23, 2008	Mount Lemmon	Mount Lemmon Survey	·	1.5 km	MPC · JPL
558783	2015 BL_{158}	—	September 12, 2007	Kitt Peak	Spacewatch	·	2.1 km	MPC · JPL
558784	2015 BO_{158}	—	November 9, 2013	Haleakala	Pan-STARRS 1	·	2.5 km	MPC · JPL
558785	2015 BQ_{159}	—	January 19, 2004	Kitt Peak	Spacewatch	·	2.4 km	MPC · JPL
558786	2015 BN_{160}	—	July 18, 2013	Haleakala	Pan-STARRS 1	·	2.2 km	MPC · JPL
558787	2015 BH_{161}	—	May 11, 2011	Kitt Peak	Spacewatch	·	2.5 km	MPC · JPL
558788	2015 BL_{162}	—	January 17, 2015	Haleakala	Pan-STARRS 1	·	2.3 km	MPC · JPL
558789	2015 BK_{164}	—	September 28, 2013	Mount Lemmon	Mount Lemmon Survey	KOR	1.4 km	MPC · JPL
558790	2015 BD_{165}	—	October 27, 2009	Catalina	CSS	·	1.3 km	MPC · JPL
558791	2015 BP_{165}	—	October 3, 2008	Kitt Peak	Spacewatch	KOR	1.2 km	MPC · JPL
558792	2015 BA_{167}	—	May 27, 2012	Mount Lemmon	Mount Lemmon Survey	·	1.7 km	MPC · JPL
558793	2015 BJ_{172}	—	October 26, 2013	Mount Lemmon	Mount Lemmon Survey	KOR	1.1 km	MPC · JPL
558794	2015 BG_{173}	—	August 23, 2003	Palomar	NEAT	·	2.2 km	MPC · JPL
558795	2015 BX_{173}	—	January 17, 2015	Haleakala	Pan-STARRS 1	·	2.2 km	MPC · JPL
558796	2015 BZ_{173}	—	January 17, 2015	Haleakala	Pan-STARRS 1	·	2.3 km	MPC · JPL
558797	2015 BG_{176}	—	January 17, 2015	Haleakala	Pan-STARRS 1	·	1.7 km	MPC · JPL
558798	2015 BK_{176}	—	October 12, 2013	Mount Lemmon	Mount Lemmon Survey	·	2.0 km	MPC · JPL
558799	2015 BL_{176}	—	October 20, 2008	Mount Lemmon	Mount Lemmon Survey	KOR	1.2 km	MPC · JPL
558800	2015 BX_{176}	—	June 18, 2006	Kitt Peak	Spacewatch	·	2.5 km	MPC · JPL

== 558801–558900 ==
back to top

Designation			Discovery			Properties		Ref
Permanent	Provisional	Named after	Date	Site	Discoverer(s)	Category	Diam.	Ref
558801	2015 BS_{179}	—	September 19, 2007	Kitt Peak	Spacewatch	·	2.9 km	MPC · JPL
558802	2015 BP_{182}	—	January 17, 2015	Haleakala	Pan-STARRS 1	·	890 m	MPC · JPL
558803	2015 BE_{184}	—	February 17, 2010	Kitt Peak	Spacewatch	·	2.0 km	MPC · JPL
558804	2015 BL_{184}	—	March 16, 2010	Mount Lemmon	Mount Lemmon Survey	·	2.6 km	MPC · JPL
558805	2015 BP_{185}	—	January 17, 2015	Haleakala	Pan-STARRS 1	·	1.8 km	MPC · JPL
558806	2015 BJ_{187}	—	August 14, 2012	Haleakala	Pan-STARRS 1	·	2.4 km	MPC · JPL
558807	2015 BY_{187}	—	January 17, 2015	Haleakala	Pan-STARRS 1	·	2.5 km	MPC · JPL
558808	2015 BB_{188}	—	October 22, 2003	Apache Point	SDSS	·	1.5 km	MPC · JPL
558809	2015 BH_{190}	—	January 17, 2015	Haleakala	Pan-STARRS 1	·	2.4 km	MPC · JPL
558810	2015 BQ_{190}	—	March 9, 2005	Mount Lemmon	Mount Lemmon Survey	·	2.5 km	MPC · JPL
558811	2015 BW_{192}	—	January 17, 2015	Haleakala	Pan-STARRS 1	·	1.8 km	MPC · JPL
558812	2015 BD_{193}	—	February 11, 2004	Palomar	NEAT	TIR	3.0 km	MPC · JPL
558813	2015 BC_{194}	—	January 17, 2015	Haleakala	Pan-STARRS 1	(31811)	3.0 km	MPC · JPL
558814	2015 BW_{195}	—	September 12, 2007	Mount Lemmon	Mount Lemmon Survey	TIR	2.6 km	MPC · JPL
558815	2015 BZ_{195}	—	January 17, 2015	Haleakala	Pan-STARRS 1	EOS	1.5 km	MPC · JPL
558816	2015 BO_{196}	—	October 7, 2004	Palomar	NEAT	·	1.7 km	MPC · JPL
558817	2015 BS_{200}	—	September 24, 2008	Mount Lemmon	Mount Lemmon Survey	·	1.6 km	MPC · JPL
558818	2015 BR_{201}	—	May 19, 2012	Mount Lemmon	Mount Lemmon Survey	·	1.9 km	MPC · JPL
558819	2015 BR_{202}	—	January 17, 2015	Haleakala	Pan-STARRS 1	·	1.4 km	MPC · JPL
558820	2015 BN_{204}	—	September 29, 2003	Kitt Peak	Spacewatch	·	1.7 km	MPC · JPL
558821	2015 BH_{205}	—	December 23, 2014	Mount Lemmon	Mount Lemmon Survey	·	1.9 km	MPC · JPL
558822	2015 BN_{205}	—	January 18, 2015	Kitt Peak	Spacewatch	·	1.4 km	MPC · JPL
558823	2015 BK_{207}	—	May 23, 2001	Cerro Tololo	Deep Ecliptic Survey	KOR	1.6 km	MPC · JPL
558824	2015 BN_{207}	—	December 7, 2005	Kitt Peak	Spacewatch	AEO	950 m	MPC · JPL
558825	2015 BB_{208}	—	November 26, 2014	Haleakala	Pan-STARRS 1	·	1.7 km	MPC · JPL
558826	2015 BU_{208}	—	November 22, 2005	Kitt Peak	Spacewatch	·	2.0 km	MPC · JPL
558827	2015 BB_{211}	—	September 29, 2008	Kitt Peak	Spacewatch	·	2.2 km	MPC · JPL
558828	2015 BJ_{211}	—	February 18, 2010	Mount Lemmon	Mount Lemmon Survey	·	2.2 km	MPC · JPL
558829	2015 BZ_{213}	—	September 2, 2008	Kitt Peak	Spacewatch	·	1.8 km	MPC · JPL
558830	2015 BM_{214}	—	January 18, 2015	Mount Lemmon	Mount Lemmon Survey	KOR	1.3 km	MPC · JPL
558831	2015 BJ_{215}	—	January 18, 2015	Haleakala	Pan-STARRS 1	·	1.7 km	MPC · JPL
558832	2015 BU_{215}	—	November 9, 2009	Kitt Peak	Spacewatch	·	2.1 km	MPC · JPL
558833	2015 BV_{215}	—	September 30, 2013	Mount Lemmon	Mount Lemmon Survey	HOF	2.1 km	MPC · JPL
558834	2015 BO_{216}	—	January 18, 2015	Haleakala	Pan-STARRS 1	·	1.5 km	MPC · JPL
558835	2015 BQ_{216}	—	February 13, 2004	Kitt Peak	Spacewatch	·	2.4 km	MPC · JPL
558836	2015 BU_{216}	—	December 26, 2014	Haleakala	Pan-STARRS 1	·	1.7 km	MPC · JPL
558837	2015 BQ_{217}	—	April 28, 2012	Mount Lemmon	Mount Lemmon Survey	·	2.1 km	MPC · JPL
558838	2015 BU_{217}	—	September 13, 2007	Kitt Peak	Spacewatch	·	3.3 km	MPC · JPL
558839	2015 BJ_{219}	—	May 6, 2006	Mount Lemmon	Mount Lemmon Survey	EOS	1.9 km	MPC · JPL
558840	2015 BR_{220}	—	December 3, 2008	Mount Lemmon	Mount Lemmon Survey	·	2.6 km	MPC · JPL
558841	2015 BF_{221}	—	December 18, 2009	Kitt Peak	Spacewatch	·	1.5 km	MPC · JPL
558842	2015 BS_{221}	—	October 26, 2008	Kitt Peak	Spacewatch	·	2.0 km	MPC · JPL
558843	2015 BR_{224}	—	December 30, 2005	Mount Lemmon	Mount Lemmon Survey	AEO	920 m	MPC · JPL
558844	2015 BT_{224}	—	October 30, 2008	Kitt Peak	Spacewatch	EOS	1.8 km	MPC · JPL
558845	2015 BY_{224}	—	October 9, 2004	Kitt Peak	Spacewatch	·	1.7 km	MPC · JPL
558846	2015 BH_{225}	—	December 26, 2014	Haleakala	Pan-STARRS 1	AGN	880 m	MPC · JPL
558847	2015 BG_{226}	—	May 1, 2011	Haleakala	Pan-STARRS 1	·	1.8 km	MPC · JPL
558848	2015 BJ_{226}	—	December 21, 2014	Haleakala	Pan-STARRS 1	BRA	1.4 km	MPC · JPL
558849	2015 BN_{226}	—	December 21, 2014	Haleakala	Pan-STARRS 1	·	1.5 km	MPC · JPL
558850	2015 BP_{226}	—	September 26, 2013	Mount Lemmon	Mount Lemmon Survey	EOS	1.8 km	MPC · JPL
558851	2015 BR_{226}	—	October 10, 2008	Mount Lemmon	Mount Lemmon Survey	·	2.1 km	MPC · JPL
558852	2015 BV_{226}	—	January 18, 2015	Mount Lemmon	Mount Lemmon Survey	·	1.5 km	MPC · JPL
558853	2015 BA_{229}	—	October 3, 2013	Kitt Peak	Spacewatch	·	2.5 km	MPC · JPL
558854	2015 BC_{229}	—	September 24, 2008	Kitt Peak	Spacewatch	KOR	1.1 km	MPC · JPL
558855	2015 BP_{229}	—	April 4, 2011	Kitt Peak	Spacewatch	·	1.6 km	MPC · JPL
558856	2015 BT_{230}	—	October 23, 2013	Mount Lemmon	Mount Lemmon Survey	AGN	1.1 km	MPC · JPL
558857	2015 BB_{231}	—	September 3, 2013	Kitt Peak	Spacewatch	·	1.9 km	MPC · JPL
558858	2015 BC_{232}	—	March 11, 2005	Kitt Peak	Deep Ecliptic Survey	EOS	1.5 km	MPC · JPL
558859	2015 BG_{232}	—	February 16, 2010	Mount Lemmon	Mount Lemmon Survey	·	2.0 km	MPC · JPL
558860	2015 BL_{233}	—	January 18, 2015	Haleakala	Pan-STARRS 1	·	2.1 km	MPC · JPL
558861	2015 BN_{238}	—	March 14, 2011	Mount Lemmon	Mount Lemmon Survey	·	1.6 km	MPC · JPL
558862	2015 BX_{239}	—	October 4, 2008	Catalina	CSS	·	2.8 km	MPC · JPL
558863	2015 BH_{240}	—	January 18, 2015	Haleakala	Pan-STARRS 1	·	2.6 km	MPC · JPL
558864	2015 BO_{240}	—	January 18, 2015	Haleakala	Pan-STARRS 1	·	2.4 km	MPC · JPL
558865	2015 BD_{241}	—	October 1, 2008	Mount Lemmon	Mount Lemmon Survey	KOR	1.2 km	MPC · JPL
558866	2015 BG_{241}	—	February 14, 2010	Mount Lemmon	Mount Lemmon Survey	EOS	1.4 km	MPC · JPL
558867	2015 BF_{242}	—	January 27, 2004	Kitt Peak	Spacewatch	HYG	3.0 km	MPC · JPL
558868	2015 BK_{243}	—	September 5, 2007	Siding Spring	K. Sárneczky, L. Kiss	·	3.6 km	MPC · JPL
558869	2015 BR_{243}	—	January 18, 2015	Haleakala	Pan-STARRS 1	·	2.4 km	MPC · JPL
558870	2015 BY_{244}	—	September 15, 2013	Mount Lemmon	Mount Lemmon Survey	·	2.5 km	MPC · JPL
558871	2015 BA_{245}	—	October 1, 2008	Mount Lemmon	Mount Lemmon Survey	KOR	1.1 km	MPC · JPL
558872	2015 BA_{246}	—	January 18, 2015	Haleakala	Pan-STARRS 1	·	1.1 km	MPC · JPL
558873	2015 BB_{248}	—	January 18, 2015	Haleakala	Pan-STARRS 1	·	1.6 km	MPC · JPL
558874	2015 BT_{248}	—	January 22, 2004	Socorro	LINEAR	·	2.4 km	MPC · JPL
558875	2015 BD_{250}	—	January 18, 2004	Palomar	NEAT	·	2.4 km	MPC · JPL
558876	2015 BF_{250}	—	December 27, 2014	Mount Lemmon	Mount Lemmon Survey	·	2.8 km	MPC · JPL
558877	2015 BG_{250}	—	September 15, 2007	Goodricke-Pigott	R. A. Tucker	EOS	2.4 km	MPC · JPL
558878	2015 BC_{251}	—	January 18, 2015	Haleakala	Pan-STARRS 1	·	1.4 km	MPC · JPL
558879	2015 BT_{251}	—	January 28, 2004	Kitt Peak	Spacewatch	·	2.2 km	MPC · JPL
558880	2015 BF_{253}	—	January 18, 2015	Haleakala	Pan-STARRS 1	·	2.1 km	MPC · JPL
558881	2015 BG_{253}	—	October 23, 2008	Kitt Peak	Spacewatch	EOS	2.5 km	MPC · JPL
558882	2015 BQ_{253}	—	November 1, 2008	Mount Lemmon	Mount Lemmon Survey	·	3.2 km	MPC · JPL
558883	2015 BU_{253}	—	September 15, 2013	Haleakala	Pan-STARRS 1	AGN	1.1 km	MPC · JPL
558884	2015 BD_{254}	—	March 15, 2007	Mount Lemmon	Mount Lemmon Survey	WIT	1.0 km	MPC · JPL
558885	2015 BR_{254}	—	January 18, 2015	Haleakala	Pan-STARRS 1	·	3.0 km	MPC · JPL
558886	2015 BX_{254}	—	January 1, 2009	Kitt Peak	Spacewatch	·	3.1 km	MPC · JPL
558887	2015 BT_{255}	—	September 6, 2007	Siding Spring	SSS	T_{j} (2.99) · EUP	3.4 km	MPC · JPL
558888	2015 BY_{256}	—	December 4, 2008	Mount Lemmon	Mount Lemmon Survey	·	2.3 km	MPC · JPL
558889	2015 BA_{257}	—	September 11, 2013	Calar Alto-CASADO	Mottola, S.	EOS	1.5 km	MPC · JPL
558890	2015 BS_{257}	—	August 13, 2012	Haleakala	Pan-STARRS 1	·	1.9 km	MPC · JPL
558891	2015 BL_{258}	—	February 17, 2010	Kitt Peak	Spacewatch	·	2.0 km	MPC · JPL
558892	2015 BN_{258}	—	March 18, 2010	Mount Lemmon	Mount Lemmon Survey	·	2.5 km	MPC · JPL
558893	2015 BJ_{260}	—	September 30, 2013	Mount Lemmon	Mount Lemmon Survey	BRA	1.4 km	MPC · JPL
558894	2015 BL_{260}	—	December 29, 2003	Kitt Peak	Spacewatch	·	2.5 km	MPC · JPL
558895	2015 BV_{260}	—	February 17, 2004	Kitt Peak	Spacewatch	·	2.1 km	MPC · JPL
558896	2015 BQ_{261}	—	January 18, 2015	Mount Lemmon	Mount Lemmon Survey	·	2.2 km	MPC · JPL
558897	2015 BB_{262}	—	March 16, 2010	Kitt Peak	Spacewatch	·	2.1 km	MPC · JPL
558898	2015 BC_{263}	—	January 18, 2015	Haleakala	Pan-STARRS 1	·	1.9 km	MPC · JPL
558899	2015 BN_{263}	—	April 2, 2005	Mount Lemmon	Mount Lemmon Survey	·	1.8 km	MPC · JPL
558900	2015 BE_{264}	—	December 3, 2008	Mount Lemmon	Mount Lemmon Survey	·	3.7 km	MPC · JPL

== 558901–559000 ==
back to top

Designation			Discovery			Properties		Ref
Permanent	Provisional	Named after	Date	Site	Discoverer(s)	Category	Diam.	Ref
558901	2015 BG_{264}	—	November 14, 2002	Palomar	NEAT	·	2.8 km	MPC · JPL
558902	2015 BW_{264}	—	January 29, 2003	Apache Point	SDSS	·	3.3 km	MPC · JPL
558903	2015 BM_{266}	—	December 18, 2014	Haleakala	Pan-STARRS 1	·	1.5 km	MPC · JPL
558904	2015 BA_{267}	—	February 21, 2007	Mount Lemmon	Mount Lemmon Survey	·	1.1 km	MPC · JPL
558905	2015 BQ_{267}	—	April 13, 2011	Haleakala	Pan-STARRS 1	·	2.8 km	MPC · JPL
558906	2015 BV_{267}	—	September 18, 2014	Haleakala	Pan-STARRS 1	·	2.4 km	MPC · JPL
558907	2015 BM_{268}	—	September 22, 2014	Haleakala	Pan-STARRS 1	HNS	880 m	MPC · JPL
558908	2015 BO_{268}	—	February 25, 2007	Mount Lemmon	Mount Lemmon Survey	HNS	810 m	MPC · JPL
558909	2015 BN_{269}	—	February 23, 2010	La Palma	La Palma	·	2.6 km	MPC · JPL
558910	2015 BT_{269}	—	January 19, 2015	Mount Lemmon	Mount Lemmon Survey	·	3.2 km	MPC · JPL
558911	2015 BH_{270}	—	November 24, 2014	Mount Lemmon	Mount Lemmon Survey	·	1.7 km	MPC · JPL
558912	2015 BV_{270}	—	September 3, 2005	Catalina	CSS	EUN	1.1 km	MPC · JPL
558913	2015 BB_{271}	—	January 19, 2015	Haleakala	Pan-STARRS 1	·	1.9 km	MPC · JPL
558914	2015 BE_{271}	—	July 13, 2013	Mount Lemmon	Mount Lemmon Survey	·	1.8 km	MPC · JPL
558915	2015 BK_{271}	—	January 22, 2002	Kitt Peak	Spacewatch	·	2.3 km	MPC · JPL
558916	2015 BO_{271}	—	December 30, 2008	Mount Lemmon	Mount Lemmon Survey	·	1.8 km	MPC · JPL
558917	2015 BV_{271}	—	February 14, 2010	Kitt Peak	Spacewatch	·	1.4 km	MPC · JPL
558918	2015 BW_{271}	—	October 28, 2013	Mount Lemmon	Mount Lemmon Survey	·	3.0 km	MPC · JPL
558919	2015 BG_{272}	—	August 17, 2009	Kitt Peak	Spacewatch	·	1.5 km	MPC · JPL
558920	2015 BT_{272}	—	December 13, 2014	Haleakala	Pan-STARRS 1	H	520 m	MPC · JPL
558921	2015 BN_{274}	—	January 19, 2015	Kitt Peak	Spacewatch	·	2.3 km	MPC · JPL
558922	2015 BV_{274}	—	August 30, 2005	Palomar	NEAT	EUN	1.0 km	MPC · JPL
558923	2015 BT_{276}	—	February 12, 2011	Mount Lemmon	Mount Lemmon Survey	HOF	1.9 km	MPC · JPL
558924	2015 BC_{277}	—	January 19, 2015	Mount Lemmon	Mount Lemmon Survey	EOS	1.6 km	MPC · JPL
558925	2015 BC_{280}	—	October 9, 2013	Mount Lemmon	Mount Lemmon Survey	·	1.7 km	MPC · JPL
558926	2015 BD_{281}	—	October 8, 2008	Kitt Peak	Spacewatch	·	1.7 km	MPC · JPL
558927	2015 BJ_{281}	—	October 3, 2013	Haleakala	Pan-STARRS 1	VER	2.3 km	MPC · JPL
558928	2015 BV_{281}	—	October 5, 2013	Haleakala	Pan-STARRS 1	·	2.2 km	MPC · JPL
558929	2015 BB_{282}	—	October 3, 2013	Haleakala	Pan-STARRS 1	·	1.6 km	MPC · JPL
558930	2015 BE_{282}	—	May 14, 2008	Kitt Peak	Spacewatch	·	1.4 km	MPC · JPL
558931	2015 BF_{282}	—	May 15, 2012	Mount Lemmon	Mount Lemmon Survey	·	1.6 km	MPC · JPL
558932	2015 BP_{283}	—	February 17, 2010	Kitt Peak	Spacewatch	EOS	1.4 km	MPC · JPL
558933	2015 BS_{283}	—	October 3, 2013	Kitt Peak	Spacewatch	·	2.8 km	MPC · JPL
558934	2015 BD_{285}	—	November 30, 2008	Kitt Peak	Spacewatch	·	3.8 km	MPC · JPL
558935	2015 BQ_{285}	—	January 19, 2015	Haleakala	Pan-STARRS 1	·	2.3 km	MPC · JPL
558936	2015 BU_{285}	—	December 21, 2008	Catalina	CSS	·	2.9 km	MPC · JPL
558937	2015 BT_{286}	—	November 23, 2014	Haleakala	Pan-STARRS 1	AEG	2.4 km	MPC · JPL
558938	2015 BV_{286}	—	January 19, 2015	Haleakala	Pan-STARRS 1	·	2.0 km	MPC · JPL
558939	2015 BO_{288}	—	January 19, 2015	Haleakala	Pan-STARRS 1	·	1.6 km	MPC · JPL
558940	2015 BG_{289}	—	November 20, 2008	Kitt Peak	Spacewatch	EOS	1.7 km	MPC · JPL
558941	2015 BO_{289}	—	September 10, 2007	Mount Lemmon	Mount Lemmon Survey	·	2.6 km	MPC · JPL
558942	2015 BQ_{289}	—	May 6, 2011	Mount Lemmon	Mount Lemmon Survey	EOS	1.5 km	MPC · JPL
558943	2015 BT_{289}	—	December 2, 2005	Kitt Peak	Spacewatch	HNS	1.4 km	MPC · JPL
558944	2015 BX_{289}	—	June 4, 2010	WISE	WISE	·	3.4 km	MPC · JPL
558945	2015 BU_{290}	—	February 18, 2010	Mount Lemmon	Mount Lemmon Survey	·	1.8 km	MPC · JPL
558946	2015 BL_{291}	—	April 16, 2005	Kitt Peak	Spacewatch	·	2.1 km	MPC · JPL
558947	2015 BM_{291}	—	February 12, 2004	Kitt Peak	Spacewatch	·	2.1 km	MPC · JPL
558948	2015 BY_{291}	—	April 5, 2005	Mount Lemmon	Mount Lemmon Survey	·	2.6 km	MPC · JPL
558949	2015 BM_{293}	—	August 13, 2012	Haleakala	Pan-STARRS 1	·	3.2 km	MPC · JPL
558950	2015 BW_{295}	—	November 27, 2013	Haleakala	Pan-STARRS 1	·	2.4 km	MPC · JPL
558951	2015 BX_{295}	—	October 8, 2007	Mount Lemmon	Mount Lemmon Survey	·	3.2 km	MPC · JPL
558952	2015 BZ_{295}	—	September 14, 2007	Mount Lemmon	Mount Lemmon Survey	·	2.8 km	MPC · JPL
558953	2015 BX_{297}	—	November 6, 2013	Mount Lemmon	Mount Lemmon Survey	·	3.3 km	MPC · JPL
558954	2015 BB_{303}	—	February 3, 2009	Mount Lemmon	Mount Lemmon Survey	·	2.6 km	MPC · JPL
558955	2015 BC_{303}	—	January 26, 2009	Kitt Peak	Spacewatch	·	2.8 km	MPC · JPL
558956	2015 BE_{303}	—	January 19, 2015	Haleakala	Pan-STARRS 1	·	2.9 km	MPC · JPL
558957	2015 BY_{306}	—	September 11, 2007	Mount Lemmon	Mount Lemmon Survey	·	2.0 km	MPC · JPL
558958	2015 BG_{307}	—	January 20, 2015	Mount Lemmon	Mount Lemmon Survey	·	1.6 km	MPC · JPL
558959	2015 BL_{307}	—	December 3, 2008	Kitt Peak	Spacewatch	THB	2.7 km	MPC · JPL
558960	2015 BL_{308}	—	January 6, 2010	Kitt Peak	Spacewatch	·	1.4 km	MPC · JPL
558961	2015 BA_{309}	—	November 26, 2003	Kitt Peak	Spacewatch	EOS	1.5 km	MPC · JPL
558962	2015 BB_{309}	—	November 11, 2013	Kitt Peak	Spacewatch	VER	2.3 km	MPC · JPL
558963	2015 BM_{309}	—	February 18, 2010	Mount Lemmon	Mount Lemmon Survey	·	2.3 km	MPC · JPL
558964	2015 BO_{309}	—	January 20, 2015	Mount Lemmon	Mount Lemmon Survey	·	2.4 km	MPC · JPL
558965	2015 BT_{309}	—	February 11, 2004	Palomar	NEAT	·	3.6 km	MPC · JPL
558966	2015 BF_{310}	—	July 30, 2008	Siding Spring	SSS	JUN	880 m	MPC · JPL
558967	2015 BV_{312}	—	May 1, 2003	Kitt Peak	Spacewatch	MRX	1.2 km	MPC · JPL
558968	2015 BH_{313}	—	November 26, 2014	Haleakala	Pan-STARRS 1	EOS	1.7 km	MPC · JPL
558969	2015 BK_{313}	—	January 16, 2015	Mount Lemmon	Mount Lemmon Survey	·	1.6 km	MPC · JPL
558970	2015 BL_{313}	—	December 5, 2008	Mount Lemmon	Mount Lemmon Survey	·	3.0 km	MPC · JPL
558971	2015 BP_{313}	—	February 7, 2011	Mount Lemmon	Mount Lemmon Survey	·	1.6 km	MPC · JPL
558972	2015 BX_{313}	—	January 16, 2015	Haleakala	Pan-STARRS 1	·	2.6 km	MPC · JPL
558973	2015 BP_{314}	—	October 8, 2007	Catalina	CSS	·	3.6 km	MPC · JPL
558974	2015 BQ_{314}	—	August 29, 2006	Catalina	CSS	·	3.3 km	MPC · JPL
558975	2015 BR_{316}	—	August 23, 2001	Kitt Peak	Spacewatch	·	3.1 km	MPC · JPL
558976	2015 BE_{317}	—	March 25, 2006	Kitt Peak	Spacewatch	KOR	1.1 km	MPC · JPL
558977	2015 BF_{317}	—	September 23, 2008	Mount Lemmon	Mount Lemmon Survey	·	1.2 km	MPC · JPL
558978	2015 BH_{319}	—	August 10, 2007	Kitt Peak	Spacewatch	·	2.1 km	MPC · JPL
558979	2015 BR_{319}	—	January 17, 2015	Haleakala	Pan-STARRS 1	·	1.3 km	MPC · JPL
558980	2015 BY_{321}	—	January 17, 2015	Haleakala	Pan-STARRS 1	·	1.9 km	MPC · JPL
558981	2015 BH_{324}	—	September 12, 2007	Mount Lemmon	Mount Lemmon Survey	·	2.5 km	MPC · JPL
558982	2015 BA_{325}	—	August 13, 2012	Haleakala	Pan-STARRS 1	·	2.4 km	MPC · JPL
558983	2015 BP_{325}	—	October 1, 2008	Mount Lemmon	Mount Lemmon Survey	·	2.7 km	MPC · JPL
558984	2015 BZ_{325}	—	January 17, 2015	Haleakala	Pan-STARRS 1	·	1.9 km	MPC · JPL
558985	2015 BB_{327}	—	January 17, 2015	Haleakala	Pan-STARRS 1	·	2.2 km	MPC · JPL
558986	2015 BN_{327}	—	October 28, 2008	Mount Lemmon	Mount Lemmon Survey	KOR	1.3 km	MPC · JPL
558987	2015 BR_{328}	—	June 16, 2012	Haleakala	Pan-STARRS 1	KOR	1.2 km	MPC · JPL
558988	2015 BU_{328}	—	January 17, 2015	Haleakala	Pan-STARRS 1	·	1.9 km	MPC · JPL
558989	2015 BA_{330}	—	December 21, 2008	Mount Lemmon	Mount Lemmon Survey	·	2.9 km	MPC · JPL
558990	2015 BD_{330}	—	August 24, 2001	Palomar	NEAT	·	3.3 km	MPC · JPL
558991	2015 BG_{330}	—	January 31, 2009	Kitt Peak	Spacewatch	·	3.6 km	MPC · JPL
558992	2015 BL_{330}	—	May 2, 2006	Kitt Peak	Spacewatch	·	2.2 km	MPC · JPL
558993	2015 BO_{330}	—	January 17, 2015	Haleakala	Pan-STARRS 1	EOS	1.8 km	MPC · JPL
558994	2015 BE_{331}	—	November 4, 2013	Mount Lemmon	Mount Lemmon Survey	KOR	1.1 km	MPC · JPL
558995	2015 BS_{331}	—	April 12, 2005	Kitt Peak	Deep Ecliptic Survey	·	1.6 km	MPC · JPL
558996	2015 BP_{336}	—	April 6, 2011	Mount Lemmon	Mount Lemmon Survey	·	2.6 km	MPC · JPL
558997	2015 BW_{336}	—	October 2, 2013	Kitt Peak	Spacewatch	VER	2.4 km	MPC · JPL
558998	2015 BB_{338}	—	September 26, 2003	Apache Point	SDSS Collaboration	·	1.5 km	MPC · JPL
558999	2015 BG_{338}	—	September 12, 2007	Mount Lemmon	Mount Lemmon Survey	EOS	1.8 km	MPC · JPL
559000	2015 BS_{340}	—	September 9, 2007	Kitt Peak	Spacewatch	·	2.7 km	MPC · JPL

back to top

== Meaning of names ==
As minor planet discoveries are confirmed, they are given a permanent number by the IAU's Minor Planet Center (MPC), and the discoverers can then submit names for them, following the IAU's naming conventions. The list below concerns those minor planets in the specified number-range that have received names, and explains the meanings of those names.

Official naming citations of newly named small Solar System bodies are approved and published in a bulletin by IAU's Working Group for Small Bodies Nomenclature (WGSBN). Before May 2021, citations were published in MPC's Minor Planet Circulars for many decades. Recent citations can also be found on the JPL Small-Body Database (SBDB). Until his death in 2016, German astronomer Lutz D. Schmadel compiled these citations into the Dictionary of Minor Planet Names (DMP) and regularly updated the collection.

Based on Paul Herget's The Names of the Minor Planets, Schmadel also researched the unclear origin of numerous asteroids, most of which had been named prior to World War II. This article incorporates text from this source, which is in the public domain: SBDB New namings may only be added to this list below after official publication as the preannouncement of names is condemned. The WGSBN publishes a comprehensive guideline for the naming rules of non-cometary small Solar System bodies.

Named minor planet	Provisional	This minor planet was named for...	Ref · Catalog
558195 Eugengindl	2014 YF_{19}	Eugen Gindl (1944–2021), Slovak journalist, screenwriter and activist.	IAU · 558195
558398 Nagysándor	2015 AT_{140}	Sándor Nagy (b. 1970), a Slovak amateur astronomer and science promoter.	IAU · 558398
