= List of minor planets: 553001–554000 =

The following is a partial list of minor planets, running from minor-planet number 553001 through 554000, inclusive. The primary data for this and other partial lists is based on JPL's "Small-Body Orbital Elements" and data available from the Minor Planet Center. Critical list information is also provided by the MPC, unless otherwise specified from Lowell Observatory. A detailed description of the table's columns and additional sources are given on the main page including a complete list of every page in this series, and a statistical break-up on the dynamical classification of minor planets.

Also see the summary list of all named bodies in numerical and alphabetical order, and the corresponding naming citations for the number range of this particular list. New namings may only be added to this list after official publication, as the preannouncement of names is condemned by the Working Group for Small Bodies Nomenclature of the International Astronomical Union.

Near-Earth obj.	MBA (inner)	MBA (outer)	Centaur
Mars-crosser	MBA (middle)	Jupiter trojan	Trans-Neptunian obj.
Unclassified

== 553001–553100 ==
Designation			Discovery			Properties		Ref
Permanent	Provisional	Named after	Date	Site	Discoverer(s)	Category	Diam.	Ref
553001	2010 XE_{54}	—	November 10, 2010	Mount Lemmon	Mount Lemmon Survey	·	1.1 km	MPC; JPL
553002	2010 XB_{61}	—	November 25, 2010	Mount Lemmon	Mount Lemmon Survey	·	1.1 km	MPC; JPL
553003	2010 XV_{62}	—	December 1, 2010	Mount Lemmon	Mount Lemmon Survey	3:2	5.0 km	MPC; JPL
553004	2010 XY_{68}	—	November 30, 2010	Mount Lemmon	Mount Lemmon Survey	·	910 m	MPC; JPL
553005	2010 XU_{70}	—	December 9, 2010	Kitt Peak	Spacewatch	GAL	1.3 km	MPC; JPL
553006	2010 XD_{76}	—	November 14, 2010	Mount Lemmon	Mount Lemmon Survey	·	1.3 km	MPC; JPL
553007	2010 XD_{81}	—	October 29, 2010	Kitt Peak	Spacewatch	·	1.2 km	MPC; JPL
553008	2010 XF_{83}	—	January 17, 2007	Kitt Peak	Spacewatch	·	1.2 km	MPC; JPL
553009	2010 XN_{90}	—	August 31, 2014	Haleakala	Pan-STARRS 1	·	1.3 km	MPC; JPL
553010	2010 XX_{93}	—	December 31, 2007	Mount Lemmon	Mount Lemmon Survey	·	770 m	MPC; JPL
553011	2010 XA_{95}	—	June 5, 2013	Mount Lemmon	Mount Lemmon Survey	·	940 m	MPC; JPL
553012	2010 XM_{95}	—	November 27, 2014	Haleakala	Pan-STARRS 1	MAR	940 m	MPC; JPL
553013	2010 XN_{95}	—	February 24, 2012	Mount Lemmon	Mount Lemmon Survey	·	1.4 km	MPC; JPL
553014	2010 XO_{95}	—	December 14, 2010	Kitt Peak	Spacewatch	·	1.6 km	MPC; JPL
553015	2010 XB_{96}	—	May 12, 2013	Haleakala	Pan-STARRS 1	EUN	870 m	MPC; JPL
553016	2010 XR_{99}	—	December 6, 2010	Mount Lemmon	Mount Lemmon Survey	3:2	3.6 km	MPC; JPL
553017	2010 XA_{108}	—	January 12, 2016	Calar Alto-CASADO	Hellmich, S., Mottola, S.	·	1.4 km	MPC; JPL
553018	2010 XD_{109}	—	January 27, 2007	Mount Lemmon	Mount Lemmon Survey	·	1.3 km	MPC; JPL
553019	2010 XQ_{109}	—	December 3, 2010	Mount Lemmon	Mount Lemmon Survey	(29841)	1.1 km	MPC; JPL
553020	2010 XU_{109}	—	December 13, 2010	Mount Lemmon	Mount Lemmon Survey	·	1.3 km	MPC; JPL
553021	2010 XJ_{115}	—	December 13, 2010	Kitt Peak	Spacewatch	·	580 m	MPC; JPL
553022	2010 XL_{115}	—	December 6, 2010	Mount Lemmon	Mount Lemmon Survey	·	2.7 km	MPC; JPL
553023	2010 YZ_{1}	—	November 25, 2006	Mount Lemmon	Mount Lemmon Survey	·	1.6 km	MPC; JPL
553024	2010 YE_{4}	—	December 8, 2010	Mount Lemmon	Mount Lemmon Survey	·	2.0 km	MPC; JPL
553025	2010 YJ_{6}	—	November 11, 1996	Kitt Peak	Spacewatch	DOR	1.7 km	MPC; JPL
553026	2011 AJ_{1}	—	November 24, 2006	Mount Lemmon	Mount Lemmon Survey	·	1.3 km	MPC; JPL
553027	2011 AU_{2}	—	December 3, 2010	Kitt Peak	Spacewatch	·	1.8 km	MPC; JPL
553028	2011 AJ_{3}	—	November 12, 2010	Kitt Peak	Spacewatch	·	1.1 km	MPC; JPL
553029	2011 AQ_{8}	—	December 14, 2010	Mount Lemmon	Mount Lemmon Survey	AEO	950 m	MPC; JPL
553030	2011 AV_{11}	—	August 29, 2005	Palomar	NEAT	·	1.6 km	MPC; JPL
553031	2011 AY_{11}	—	November 16, 2010	Mount Lemmon	Mount Lemmon Survey	·	1.6 km	MPC; JPL
553032	2011 AZ_{14}	—	December 8, 2010	Mount Lemmon	Mount Lemmon Survey	·	1.1 km	MPC; JPL
553033	2011 AX_{16}	—	December 1, 2010	Mount Lemmon	Mount Lemmon Survey	·	980 m	MPC; JPL
553034	2011 AY_{16}	—	November 8, 2010	Mount Lemmon	Mount Lemmon Survey	·	1.1 km	MPC; JPL
553035 Faikmusayev	2011 AM_{34}	Faikmusayev	January 10, 2011	Zelenchukskaya Stn	T. V. Krjačko, Satovski, B.	·	810 m	MPC; JPL
553036	2011 AV_{38}	—	January 10, 2011	Kitt Peak	Spacewatch	·	1.5 km	MPC; JPL
553037	2011 AG_{44}	—	October 7, 2005	Mauna Kea	A. Boattini	EOS	1.5 km	MPC; JPL
553038	2011 AA_{51}	—	January 13, 2011	Mount Lemmon	Mount Lemmon Survey	·	1.2 km	MPC; JPL
553039	2011 AH_{62}	—	August 29, 2009	Kitt Peak	Spacewatch	·	1.5 km	MPC; JPL
553040	2011 AO_{62}	—	January 13, 2011	Mount Lemmon	Mount Lemmon Survey	·	2.0 km	MPC; JPL
553041	2011 AR_{64}	—	January 11, 2008	Kitt Peak	Spacewatch	·	840 m	MPC; JPL
553042	2011 AG_{72}	—	May 8, 1994	Kitt Peak	Spacewatch	·	1.8 km	MPC; JPL
553043	2011 AK_{81}	—	October 28, 2005	Kitt Peak	Spacewatch	PAD	1.3 km	MPC; JPL
553044	2011 AM_{81}	—	January 14, 2011	Mount Lemmon	Mount Lemmon Survey	·	1.2 km	MPC; JPL
553045	2011 AO_{84}	—	July 30, 2016	Haleakala	Pan-STARRS 1	·	860 m	MPC; JPL
553046	2011 AH_{86}	—	September 2, 2014	Haleakala	Pan-STARRS 1	·	1.7 km	MPC; JPL
553047	2011 AN_{86}	—	January 14, 2011	Mount Lemmon	Mount Lemmon Survey	·	500 m	MPC; JPL
553048	2011 AD_{87}	—	December 6, 2010	Mount Lemmon	Mount Lemmon Survey	·	880 m	MPC; JPL
553049	2011 AZ_{89}	—	June 18, 2013	Haleakala	Pan-STARRS 1	·	1.3 km	MPC; JPL
553050	2011 AF_{90}	—	November 5, 2010	Kitt Peak	Spacewatch	·	1.6 km	MPC; JPL
553051	2011 AO_{90}	—	January 8, 2011	Mount Lemmon	Mount Lemmon Survey	·	480 m	MPC; JPL
553052	2011 AN_{93}	—	January 2, 2011	Mount Lemmon	Mount Lemmon Survey	·	1.7 km	MPC; JPL
553053	2011 AH_{95}	—	January 10, 2011	Mount Lemmon	Mount Lemmon Survey	·	2.0 km	MPC; JPL
553054	2011 AE_{96}	—	January 2, 2011	Mount Lemmon	Mount Lemmon Survey	WIT	690 m	MPC; JPL
553055	2011 AW_{96}	—	January 14, 2011	Kitt Peak	Spacewatch	BRA	860 m	MPC; JPL
553056	2011 AB_{98}	—	January 14, 2011	Mount Lemmon	Mount Lemmon Survey	EOS	1.5 km	MPC; JPL
553057	2011 AG_{98}	—	March 11, 2007	Mount Lemmon	Mount Lemmon Survey	·	1.3 km	MPC; JPL
553058	2011 AY_{99}	—	January 12, 2011	Mount Lemmon	Mount Lemmon Survey	(12739)	1.3 km	MPC; JPL
553059	2011 AE_{100}	—	January 4, 2011	Mount Lemmon	Mount Lemmon Survey	·	2.0 km	MPC; JPL
553060	2011 AT_{100}	—	January 2, 2011	Mount Lemmon	Mount Lemmon Survey	·	440 m	MPC; JPL
553061	2011 BM_{4}	—	December 3, 2010	Mount Lemmon	Mount Lemmon Survey	H	520 m	MPC; JPL
553062	2011 BX_{4}	—	November 25, 2005	Kitt Peak	Spacewatch	·	1.7 km	MPC; JPL
553063	2011 BC_{7}	—	December 5, 2010	Mount Lemmon	Mount Lemmon Survey	HNS	1.1 km	MPC; JPL
553064	2011 BQ_{8}	—	September 27, 2009	Mount Lemmon	Mount Lemmon Survey	WIT	1.1 km	MPC; JPL
553065	2011 BD_{9}	—	December 1, 2005	Kitt Peak	Spacewatch	·	1.8 km	MPC; JPL
553066	2011 BN_{18}	—	January 26, 2011	Mount Lemmon	Mount Lemmon Survey	·	1.5 km	MPC; JPL
553067	2011 BE_{26}	—	January 12, 2011	Kitt Peak	Spacewatch	·	1.9 km	MPC; JPL
553068	2011 BJ_{26}	—	January 23, 2011	Mount Lemmon	Mount Lemmon Survey	·	1.6 km	MPC; JPL
553069	2011 BS_{28}	—	January 26, 2011	Mount Lemmon	Mount Lemmon Survey	·	1.5 km	MPC; JPL
553070	2011 BU_{29}	—	December 9, 2010	Mount Lemmon	Mount Lemmon Survey	·	1.8 km	MPC; JPL
553071	2011 BN_{35}	—	January 28, 2011	Mount Lemmon	Mount Lemmon Survey	·	1.5 km	MPC; JPL
553072	2011 BV_{36}	—	September 18, 2009	Kitt Peak	Spacewatch	AGN	1.1 km	MPC; JPL
553073	2011 BR_{37}	—	January 28, 2011	Sandlot	G. Hug	·	1.7 km	MPC; JPL
553074	2011 BM_{43}	—	October 18, 2009	Mount Lemmon	Mount Lemmon Survey	AGN	880 m	MPC; JPL
553075	2011 BT_{43}	—	September 20, 1995	Kitt Peak	Spacewatch	HOF	2.0 km	MPC; JPL
553076 Maturkanič	2011 BQ_{44}	Maturkanič	January 30, 2011	Piszkés-tető	K. Sárneczky, S. Kürti	HOF	2.0 km	MPC; JPL
553077	2011 BP_{47}	—	January 31, 2011	Piszkés-tető	K. Sárneczky, Z. Kuli	WIT	1.0 km	MPC; JPL
553078 Balassibálint	2011 BB_{48}	Balassibálint	January 31, 2011	Piszkés-tető	K. Sárneczky, Z. Kuli	·	2.3 km	MPC; JPL
553079	2011 BG_{49}	—	January 31, 2011	Piszkés-tető	K. Sárneczky, Z. Kuli	·	1.5 km	MPC; JPL
553080	2011 BF_{50}	—	October 24, 2009	Kitt Peak	Spacewatch	WIT	790 m	MPC; JPL
553081	2011 BC_{55}	—	January 26, 2011	Mount Lemmon	Mount Lemmon Survey	·	1.7 km	MPC; JPL
553082	2011 BD_{55}	—	April 10, 2003	Kitt Peak	Spacewatch	·	1.1 km	MPC; JPL
553083	2011 BO_{58}	—	January 30, 2011	Mount Lemmon	Mount Lemmon Survey	·	1.6 km	MPC; JPL
553084	2011 BE_{60}	—	January 11, 2011	Kitt Peak	Spacewatch	·	2.0 km	MPC; JPL
553085	2011 BX_{60}	—	December 17, 2001	Socorro	LINEAR	·	1.8 km	MPC; JPL
553086	2011 BL_{66}	—	January 31, 2011	Piszkés-tető	K. Sárneczky, Z. Kuli	·	1.5 km	MPC; JPL
553087	2011 BV_{67}	—	January 28, 2011	Mount Lemmon	Mount Lemmon Survey	·	1.4 km	MPC; JPL
553088	2011 BX_{76}	—	January 30, 2011	Haleakala	Pan-STARRS 1	·	1.6 km	MPC; JPL
553089	2011 BT_{84}	—	January 12, 2011	Kitt Peak	Spacewatch	·	2.4 km	MPC; JPL
553090	2011 BD_{87}	—	December 8, 2010	Mount Lemmon	Mount Lemmon Survey	EUN	860 m	MPC; JPL
553091	2011 BL_{91}	—	May 8, 2008	Mount Lemmon	Mount Lemmon Survey	·	1.8 km	MPC; JPL
553092	2011 BR_{92}	—	January 28, 2011	Mount Lemmon	Mount Lemmon Survey	PAD	2.1 km	MPC; JPL
553093	2011 BS_{92}	—	March 16, 2007	Kitt Peak	Spacewatch	GEF	1.1 km	MPC; JPL
553094	2011 BY_{92}	—	October 23, 2009	Kitt Peak	Spacewatch	·	2.0 km	MPC; JPL
553095	2011 BQ_{94}	—	November 25, 2005	Kitt Peak	Spacewatch	·	1.6 km	MPC; JPL
553096	2011 BK_{99}	—	February 5, 2011	Mount Lemmon	Mount Lemmon Survey	GEF	1.0 km	MPC; JPL
553097	2011 BE_{101}	—	December 27, 2006	Mount Lemmon	Mount Lemmon Survey	·	2.2 km	MPC; JPL
553098	2011 BH_{102}	—	January 23, 2006	Kitt Peak	Spacewatch	·	1.5 km	MPC; JPL
553099	2011 BF_{104}	—	January 27, 2011	Mount Lemmon	Mount Lemmon Survey	·	1.7 km	MPC; JPL
553100	2011 BM_{104}	—	December 9, 2010	Mount Lemmon	Mount Lemmon Survey	·	1.8 km	MPC; JPL

== 553101–553200 ==
back to top

Designation			Discovery			Properties		Ref
Permanent	Provisional	Named after	Date	Site	Discoverer(s)	Category	Diam.	Ref
553101	2011 BT_{105}	—	September 21, 2003	Kitt Peak	Spacewatch	·	650 m	MPC; JPL
553102	2011 BJ_{108}	—	October 16, 2009	Catalina	CSS	·	1.6 km	MPC; JPL
553103	2011 BQ_{116}	—	September 16, 2009	Catalina	CSS	·	2.4 km	MPC; JPL
553104	2011 BD_{118}	—	December 14, 2010	Mount Lemmon	Mount Lemmon Survey	·	1.5 km	MPC; JPL
553105	2011 BF_{118}	—	June 17, 2004	Kitt Peak	Spacewatch	EUN	1.4 km	MPC; JPL
553106	2011 BR_{118}	—	December 8, 2010	Mount Lemmon	Mount Lemmon Survey	·	1.8 km	MPC; JPL
553107	2011 BY_{120}	—	October 18, 2009	Mount Lemmon	Mount Lemmon Survey	NEM	2.3 km	MPC; JPL
553108	2011 BY_{121}	—	February 11, 2011	Mount Lemmon	Mount Lemmon Survey	·	1.7 km	MPC; JPL
553109	2011 BT_{124}	—	April 8, 2008	Kitt Peak	Spacewatch	·	530 m	MPC; JPL
553110	2011 BM_{127}	—	September 28, 2009	Kitt Peak	Spacewatch	·	1.7 km	MPC; JPL
553111	2011 BV_{127}	—	February 7, 2002	Palomar	NEAT	·	2.0 km	MPC; JPL
553112	2011 BQ_{128}	—	January 28, 2011	Mount Lemmon	Mount Lemmon Survey	·	1.6 km	MPC; JPL
553113	2011 BW_{128}	—	January 13, 2011	Kitt Peak	Spacewatch	·	2.4 km	MPC; JPL
553114	2011 BO_{131}	—	January 28, 2011	Mount Lemmon	Mount Lemmon Survey	·	1.5 km	MPC; JPL
553115	2011 BT_{137}	—	November 24, 2009	Mount Lemmon	Mount Lemmon Survey	3:2	4.0 km	MPC; JPL
553116	2011 BJ_{138}	—	January 29, 2011	Mount Lemmon	Mount Lemmon Survey	·	1.5 km	MPC; JPL
553117	2011 BZ_{138}	—	January 29, 2011	Mount Lemmon	Mount Lemmon Survey	·	1.4 km	MPC; JPL
553118	2011 BF_{139}	—	December 1, 2005	Mount Lemmon	Mount Lemmon Survey	·	1.5 km	MPC; JPL
553119	2011 BQ_{139}	—	January 8, 2011	Mount Lemmon	Mount Lemmon Survey	·	1.6 km	MPC; JPL
553120	2011 BZ_{139}	—	January 29, 2011	Mount Lemmon	Mount Lemmon Survey	·	1.4 km	MPC; JPL
553121	2011 BQ_{140}	—	January 8, 2011	Mount Lemmon	Mount Lemmon Survey	·	1.4 km	MPC; JPL
553122	2011 BV_{143}	—	January 29, 2011	Kitt Peak	Spacewatch	·	1.4 km	MPC; JPL
553123	2011 BW_{143}	—	February 13, 2002	Kitt Peak	Spacewatch	·	2.1 km	MPC; JPL
553124	2011 BN_{147}	—	January 29, 2011	Mount Lemmon	Mount Lemmon Survey	·	1.4 km	MPC; JPL
553125	2011 BF_{149}	—	September 25, 2009	Catalina	CSS	ADE	2.0 km	MPC; JPL
553126	2011 BW_{149}	—	January 29, 2011	Mount Lemmon	Mount Lemmon Survey	·	1.6 km	MPC; JPL
553127	2011 BR_{153}	—	February 2, 2011	Kitt Peak	Spacewatch	·	1.8 km	MPC; JPL
553128	2011 BT_{159}	—	January 29, 2011	Mount Lemmon	Mount Lemmon Survey	NEM	2.0 km	MPC; JPL
553129	2011 BL_{160}	—	January 29, 2011	Mount Lemmon	Mount Lemmon Survey	NEM	2.4 km	MPC; JPL
553130	2011 BH_{164}	—	February 10, 2011	Mount Lemmon	Mount Lemmon Survey	·	1.6 km	MPC; JPL
553131	2011 BJ_{164}	—	November 23, 2009	Mount Lemmon	Mount Lemmon Survey	KOR	970 m	MPC; JPL
553132	2011 BZ_{165}	—	January 23, 2011	Mount Lemmon	Mount Lemmon Survey	·	1.4 km	MPC; JPL
553133	2011 BN_{166}	—	January 28, 2011	Kitt Peak	Spacewatch	·	1.7 km	MPC; JPL
553134	2011 BJ_{167}	—	February 10, 2011	Mount Lemmon	Mount Lemmon Survey	KOR	1.0 km	MPC; JPL
553135	2011 BD_{168}	—	March 6, 2011	Mount Lemmon	Mount Lemmon Survey	·	480 m	MPC; JPL
553136	2011 BJ_{169}	—	November 29, 2014	Mount Lemmon	Mount Lemmon Survey	·	1.4 km	MPC; JPL
553137	2011 BM_{170}	—	January 22, 2011	Haleakala	Pan-STARRS 1	SDO	260 km	MPC; JPL
553138	2011 BQ_{170}	—	January 30, 2011	Haleakala	Pan-STARRS 1	cubewano (hot)	254 km	MPC; JPL
553139	2011 BX_{170}	—	February 7, 2011	Mount Lemmon	Mount Lemmon Survey	·	1.9 km	MPC; JPL
553140	2011 BH_{173}	—	February 10, 2011	Mount Lemmon	Mount Lemmon Survey	·	1.9 km	MPC; JPL
553141	2011 BG_{176}	—	March 2, 2011	Mount Lemmon	Mount Lemmon Survey	·	530 m	MPC; JPL
553142	2011 BX_{176}	—	April 20, 2012	Mount Lemmon	Mount Lemmon Survey	·	1.2 km	MPC; JPL
553143	2011 BY_{181}	—	September 15, 2013	Mount Lemmon	Mount Lemmon Survey	·	2.9 km	MPC; JPL
553144	2011 BF_{194}	—	January 28, 2011	Mount Lemmon	Mount Lemmon Survey	·	1.2 km	MPC; JPL
553145	2011 BD_{199}	—	January 29, 2011	Kitt Peak	Spacewatch	NYS	500 m	MPC; JPL
553146	2011 CJ	—	October 4, 2006	Mount Lemmon	Mount Lemmon Survey	·	610 m	MPC; JPL
553147	2011 CE_{6}	—	September 27, 2009	Kitt Peak	Spacewatch	HOF	1.9 km	MPC; JPL
553148	2011 CS_{11}	—	September 16, 2009	Kitt Peak	Spacewatch	·	1.5 km	MPC; JPL
553149	2011 CA_{12}	—	November 16, 2009	Mount Lemmon	Mount Lemmon Survey	·	1.4 km	MPC; JPL
553150	2011 CB_{12}	—	February 5, 2011	Mount Lemmon	Mount Lemmon Survey	AST	1.2 km	MPC; JPL
553151	2011 CE_{13}	—	February 5, 2011	Mount Lemmon	Mount Lemmon Survey	·	2.3 km	MPC; JPL
553152	2011 CO_{15}	—	December 9, 2010	Mount Lemmon	Mount Lemmon Survey	·	1.5 km	MPC; JPL
553153	2011 CK_{16}	—	March 5, 2002	Anderson Mesa	LONEOS	·	2.3 km	MPC; JPL
553154	2011 CE_{18}	—	March 23, 2003	Apache Point	SDSS Collaboration	KON	2.2 km	MPC; JPL
553155	2011 CT_{19}	—	January 14, 2011	Kitt Peak	Spacewatch	GEF	940 m	MPC; JPL
553156	2011 CA_{20}	—	November 24, 2005	Palomar	NEAT	EUN	1.5 km	MPC; JPL
553157	2011 CT_{25}	—	November 20, 2000	Apache Point	SDSS Collaboration	·	1.7 km	MPC; JPL
553158	2011 CR_{32}	—	October 16, 2009	Mount Lemmon	Mount Lemmon Survey	PAD	1.3 km	MPC; JPL
553159	2011 CP_{37}	—	February 5, 2011	Mount Lemmon	Mount Lemmon Survey	·	1.4 km	MPC; JPL
553160	2011 CY_{44}	—	January 30, 2011	Mount Lemmon	Mount Lemmon Survey	·	1.6 km	MPC; JPL
553161	2011 CB_{45}	—	January 31, 2011	Piszkés-tető	K. Sárneczky, Z. Kuli	·	2.0 km	MPC; JPL
553162	2011 CO_{45}	—	December 28, 2005	Kitt Peak	Spacewatch	·	1.9 km	MPC; JPL
553163	2011 CY_{45}	—	September 29, 2009	Mount Lemmon	Mount Lemmon Survey	·	1.5 km	MPC; JPL
553164	2011 CA_{50}	—	February 9, 2011	Mount Lemmon	Mount Lemmon Survey	H	270 m	MPC; JPL
553165	2011 CB_{55}	—	March 12, 2007	Mount Lemmon	Mount Lemmon Survey	·	1.4 km	MPC; JPL
553166	2011 CG_{55}	—	February 8, 2011	Mount Lemmon	Mount Lemmon Survey	·	1.4 km	MPC; JPL
553167	2011 CT_{58}	—	February 8, 2011	Mount Lemmon	Mount Lemmon Survey	·	2.1 km	MPC; JPL
553168	2011 CE_{59}	—	January 26, 2006	Kitt Peak	Spacewatch	KOR	1.0 km	MPC; JPL
553169	2011 CH_{60}	—	July 30, 2008	Mount Lemmon	Mount Lemmon Survey	·	1.3 km	MPC; JPL
553170	2011 CR_{60}	—	January 29, 2011	Bergisch Gladbach	W. Bickel	·	1.5 km	MPC; JPL
553171	2011 CM_{61}	—	February 8, 2011	Mount Lemmon	Mount Lemmon Survey	·	1.2 km	MPC; JPL
553172	2011 CU_{62}	—	February 9, 2011	Mount Lemmon	Mount Lemmon Survey	·	1.5 km	MPC; JPL
553173	2011 CK_{65}	—	February 12, 2011	Mount Lemmon	Mount Lemmon Survey	·	600 m	MPC; JPL
553174	2011 CF_{68}	—	October 30, 2009	Mount Lemmon	Mount Lemmon Survey	EUN	1.4 km	MPC; JPL
553175	2011 CU_{71}	—	January 30, 2011	Mount Lemmon	Mount Lemmon Survey	·	600 m	MPC; JPL
553176	2011 CZ_{76}	—	October 14, 2009	Mount Lemmon	Mount Lemmon Survey	·	1.7 km	MPC; JPL
553177	2011 CS_{77}	—	February 3, 2011	Piszkés-tető	K. Sárneczky, Z. Kuli	·	1.5 km	MPC; JPL
553178	2011 CL_{81}	—	November 14, 2006	Kitt Peak	Spacewatch	·	490 m	MPC; JPL
553179	2011 CY_{82}	—	February 5, 2011	Haleakala	Pan-STARRS 1	·	1.3 km	MPC; JPL
553180	2011 CE_{87}	—	March 2, 2011	Mount Lemmon	Mount Lemmon Survey	·	1.5 km	MPC; JPL
553181	2011 CG_{91}	—	February 6, 2011	Kitt Peak	Spacewatch	(2076)	580 m	MPC; JPL
553182	2011 CN_{91}	—	April 13, 2008	Kitt Peak	Spacewatch	·	620 m	MPC; JPL
553183	2011 CT_{92}	—	September 5, 2008	Kitt Peak	Spacewatch	·	2.1 km	MPC; JPL
553184	2011 CP_{93}	—	March 5, 2008	Mount Lemmon	Mount Lemmon Survey	·	660 m	MPC; JPL
553185	2011 CA_{97}	—	February 12, 2011	Mount Lemmon	Mount Lemmon Survey	·	900 m	MPC; JPL
553186	2011 CJ_{99}	—	November 9, 2009	Mount Lemmon	Mount Lemmon Survey	·	1.6 km	MPC; JPL
553187	2011 CK_{100}	—	March 8, 2008	Kitt Peak	Spacewatch	·	600 m	MPC; JPL
553188	2011 CG_{103}	—	March 5, 2011	Mount Lemmon	Mount Lemmon Survey	·	1.4 km	MPC; JPL
553189	2011 CZ_{116}	—	February 5, 2011	Haleakala	Pan-STARRS 1	PAD	1.6 km	MPC; JPL
553190	2011 CS_{120}	—	February 25, 2011	Mount Lemmon	Mount Lemmon Survey	·	1.6 km	MPC; JPL
553191	2011 CO_{127}	—	August 13, 2013	Kitt Peak	Spacewatch	·	1.5 km	MPC; JPL
553192	2011 CG_{128}	—	February 11, 2011	Mount Lemmon	Mount Lemmon Survey	·	1.4 km	MPC; JPL
553193	2011 CB_{130}	—	February 5, 2011	Haleakala	Pan-STARRS 1	·	1.5 km	MPC; JPL
553194	2011 CR_{130}	—	February 13, 2011	Mount Lemmon	Mount Lemmon Survey	·	1.7 km	MPC; JPL
553195	2011 CV_{130}	—	February 7, 2011	Mount Lemmon	Mount Lemmon Survey	·	1.4 km	MPC; JPL
553196	2011 CP_{132}	—	February 13, 2011	Mount Lemmon	Mount Lemmon Survey	·	1.4 km	MPC; JPL
553197	2011 CV_{132}	—	February 9, 2011	Mount Lemmon	Mount Lemmon Survey	·	2.9 km	MPC; JPL
553198	2011 CP_{135}	—	February 7, 2011	Kitt Peak	Spacewatch	·	1.7 km	MPC; JPL
553199	2011 CF_{136}	—	February 7, 2011	Mount Lemmon	Mount Lemmon Survey	·	1.5 km	MPC; JPL
553200	2011 DS_{14}	—	August 1, 2005	Siding Spring	SSS	·	870 m	MPC; JPL

== 553201–553300 ==
back to top

Designation			Discovery			Properties		Ref
Permanent	Provisional	Named after	Date	Site	Discoverer(s)	Category	Diam.	Ref
553201	2011 DB_{18}	—	February 10, 2011	Mount Lemmon	Mount Lemmon Survey	·	1.5 km	MPC; JPL
553202	2011 DV_{31}	—	October 8, 2004	Kitt Peak	Spacewatch	AST	1.6 km	MPC; JPL
553203	2011 DN_{33}	—	February 25, 2011	Mount Lemmon	Mount Lemmon Survey	·	820 m	MPC; JPL
553204	2011 DW_{34}	—	February 25, 2011	Mount Lemmon	Mount Lemmon Survey	KOR	1.1 km	MPC; JPL
553205	2011 DS_{39}	—	November 9, 2009	Catalina	CSS	·	1.7 km	MPC; JPL
553206	2011 DE_{45}	—	September 3, 2008	Kitt Peak	Spacewatch	·	2.5 km	MPC; JPL
553207	2011 DQ_{45}	—	February 26, 2011	Mount Lemmon	Mount Lemmon Survey	·	1.5 km	MPC; JPL
553208	2011 DW_{46}	—	February 26, 2011	Mount Lemmon	Mount Lemmon Survey	·	1.5 km	MPC; JPL
553209	2011 DE_{56}	—	February 25, 2011	Mount Lemmon	Mount Lemmon Survey	·	1.5 km	MPC; JPL
553210	2011 DN_{56}	—	February 25, 2011	Mount Lemmon	Mount Lemmon Survey	HOF	1.9 km	MPC; JPL
553211	2011 DS_{57}	—	February 26, 2011	Mount Lemmon	Mount Lemmon Survey	·	1.7 km	MPC; JPL
553212	2011 DZ_{57}	—	February 26, 2011	Mount Lemmon	Mount Lemmon Survey	HOF	2.1 km	MPC; JPL
553213	2011 EJ_{5}	—	February 10, 2011	Mount Lemmon	Mount Lemmon Survey	·	1.3 km	MPC; JPL
553214	2011 EN_{9}	—	February 10, 2011	Mount Lemmon	Mount Lemmon Survey	·	1.6 km	MPC; JPL
553215	2011 EH_{22}	—	March 4, 2011	Catalina	CSS	·	1.9 km	MPC; JPL
553216	2011 ED_{23}	—	March 4, 2011	Catalina	CSS	·	580 m	MPC; JPL
553217	2011 EL_{25}	—	April 15, 2004	Palomar	NEAT	V	800 m	MPC; JPL
553218	2011 EM_{30}	—	February 28, 2008	Kitt Peak	Spacewatch	·	530 m	MPC; JPL
553219	2011 EK_{32}	—	September 7, 2008	Mount Lemmon	Mount Lemmon Survey	KOR	1.1 km	MPC; JPL
553220	2011 EM_{32}	—	September 16, 2009	Mount Lemmon	Mount Lemmon Survey	·	510 m	MPC; JPL
553221	2011 ET_{41}	—	May 5, 2002	Palomar	NEAT	·	2.5 km	MPC; JPL
553222	2011 EN_{54}	—	November 19, 2000	Anderson Mesa	LONEOS	·	2.1 km	MPC; JPL
553223	2011 EC_{58}	—	March 12, 2011	Mount Lemmon	Mount Lemmon Survey	·	1.7 km	MPC; JPL
553224	2011 ET_{59}	—	August 23, 2008	Siding Spring	SSS	·	2.2 km	MPC; JPL
553225	2011 EO_{63}	—	March 8, 2011	Mount Lemmon	Mount Lemmon Survey	AGN	1.0 km	MPC; JPL
553226	2011 EY_{63}	—	August 23, 2004	Siding Spring	SSS	·	2.4 km	MPC; JPL
553227	2011 EZ_{63}	—	November 21, 2009	Kitt Peak	Spacewatch	·	1.8 km	MPC; JPL
553228	2011 EA_{65}	—	April 22, 2007	Kitt Peak	Spacewatch	WIT	1.1 km	MPC; JPL
553229	2011 ED_{65}	—	March 5, 2002	Apache Point	SDSS Collaboration	·	1.6 km	MPC; JPL
553230	2011 EK_{65}	—	January 30, 2011	Kitt Peak	Spacewatch	·	730 m	MPC; JPL
553231	2011 EZ_{74}	—	January 7, 2006	Kitt Peak	Spacewatch	·	1.6 km	MPC; JPL
553232	2011 EC_{80}	—	February 25, 2006	Kitt Peak	Spacewatch	·	1.6 km	MPC; JPL
553233	2011 EL_{86}	—	January 10, 2006	Kitt Peak	Spacewatch	·	2.2 km	MPC; JPL
553234	2011 EU_{91}	—	March 9, 2011	Mount Lemmon	Mount Lemmon Survey	·	1.9 km	MPC; JPL
553235	2011 EH_{99}	—	August 29, 2013	Haleakala	Pan-STARRS 1	·	1.5 km	MPC; JPL
553236	2011 EB_{101}	—	March 2, 2011	Kitt Peak	Spacewatch	GEF	1.0 km	MPC; JPL
553237	2011 EJ_{104}	—	March 10, 2011	Mount Lemmon	Mount Lemmon Survey	·	1.0 km	MPC; JPL
553238	2011 EW_{104}	—	March 9, 2011	Mount Lemmon	Mount Lemmon Survey	·	2.3 km	MPC; JPL
553239	2011 EA_{106}	—	March 14, 2011	Kitt Peak	Spacewatch	·	610 m	MPC; JPL
553240	2011 EE_{106}	—	March 15, 2011	Mount Lemmon	Mount Lemmon Survey	·	1.2 km	MPC; JPL
553241	2011 FK	—	March 22, 2011	Wildberg	R. Apitzsch	·	3.6 km	MPC; JPL
553242	2011 FL_{6}	—	March 26, 2011	Kitt Peak	Spacewatch	·	1.6 km	MPC; JPL
553243	2011 FA_{9}	—	March 27, 2011	Kitt Peak	Spacewatch	·	530 m	MPC; JPL
553244	2011 FP_{24}	—	December 29, 2003	Kitt Peak	Spacewatch	·	830 m	MPC; JPL
553245	2011 FQ_{25}	—	March 29, 2011	Piszkés-tető	K. Sárneczky, Z. Kuli	·	1.9 km	MPC; JPL
553246	2011 FA_{28}	—	August 27, 2005	Palomar	NEAT	·	830 m	MPC; JPL
553247	2011 FT_{36}	—	December 1, 2005	Kitt Peak	Wasserman, L. H., Millis, R. L.	·	1.8 km	MPC; JPL
553248	2011 FA_{39}	—	May 3, 2008	Mount Lemmon	Mount Lemmon Survey	·	520 m	MPC; JPL
553249	2011 FV_{39}	—	March 30, 2011	Mount Lemmon	Mount Lemmon Survey	·	1.3 km	MPC; JPL
553250	2011 FY_{48}	—	March 29, 2011	Piszkés-tető	K. Sárneczky, Z. Kuli	·	2.8 km	MPC; JPL
553251	2011 FW_{51}	—	October 31, 2005	Mauna Kea	A. Boattini	KOR	1.2 km	MPC; JPL
553252	2011 FR_{52}	—	February 26, 2011	Kitt Peak	Spacewatch	·	1.3 km	MPC; JPL
553253	2011 FL_{58}	—	March 30, 2011	Mount Lemmon	Mount Lemmon Survey	KOR	1.2 km	MPC; JPL
553254	2011 FB_{59}	—	March 30, 2011	Mount Lemmon	Mount Lemmon Survey	·	520 m	MPC; JPL
553255	2011 FO_{59}	—	September 18, 2009	Kitt Peak	Spacewatch	·	690 m	MPC; JPL
553256	2011 FA_{69}	—	March 27, 2011	Mount Lemmon	Mount Lemmon Survey	·	1.8 km	MPC; JPL
553257	2011 FT_{76}	—	February 26, 2011	Kitt Peak	Spacewatch	KOR	1.3 km	MPC; JPL
553258	2011 FU_{79}	—	March 9, 2011	Moletai	K. Černis	·	1.6 km	MPC; JPL
553259	2011 FM_{82}	—	March 29, 2011	Mount Lemmon	Mount Lemmon Survey	·	2.0 km	MPC; JPL
553260	2011 FX_{86}	—	April 5, 2011	Mount Lemmon	Mount Lemmon Survey	·	590 m	MPC; JPL
553261	2011 FV_{87}	—	October 19, 2006	Catalina	CSS	·	680 m	MPC; JPL
553262	2011 FJ_{92}	—	March 28, 2011	Mount Lemmon	Mount Lemmon Survey	·	1.8 km	MPC; JPL
553263	2011 FC_{97}	—	September 19, 1998	Apache Point	SDSS Collaboration	·	1.2 km	MPC; JPL
553264	2011 FF_{97}	—	September 6, 2008	Kitt Peak	Spacewatch	KOR	1.3 km	MPC; JPL
553265	2011 FU_{101}	—	March 4, 2006	Kitt Peak	Spacewatch	KOR	1.2 km	MPC; JPL
553266	2011 FG_{102}	—	April 3, 2011	Haleakala	Pan-STARRS 1	·	1 km	MPC; JPL
553267	2011 FK_{104}	—	December 2, 2005	Kitt Peak	Wasserman, L. H., Millis, R. L.	MRX	980 m	MPC; JPL
553268	2011 FT_{109}	—	April 4, 2011	Kitt Peak	Spacewatch	·	1.8 km	MPC; JPL
553269	2011 FN_{113}	—	April 1, 2011	Mount Lemmon	Mount Lemmon Survey	·	1.5 km	MPC; JPL
553270	2011 FY_{115}	—	July 24, 2003	Wise	Polishook, D.	·	2.6 km	MPC; JPL
553271	2011 FJ_{124}	—	April 1, 2011	Mount Lemmon	Mount Lemmon Survey	GEF	1.1 km	MPC; JPL
553272	2011 FL_{137}	—	October 20, 2003	Kitt Peak	Spacewatch	EOS	1.9 km	MPC; JPL
553273	2011 FK_{138}	—	March 1, 2011	Mount Lemmon	Mount Lemmon Survey	KOR	1.1 km	MPC; JPL
553274	2011 FZ_{138}	—	November 10, 2004	Kitt Peak	Spacewatch	·	2.4 km	MPC; JPL
553275	2011 FG_{139}	—	April 5, 2011	Mount Lemmon	Mount Lemmon Survey	AGN	1.1 km	MPC; JPL
553276	2011 FM_{141}	—	March 26, 2011	Mount Lemmon	Mount Lemmon Survey	EOS	2.1 km	MPC; JPL
553277	2011 FQ_{142}	—	March 28, 2011	Kitt Peak	Spacewatch	·	2.4 km	MPC; JPL
553278	2011 FF_{150}	—	March 9, 2011	Kitt Peak	Spacewatch	·	2.0 km	MPC; JPL
553279	2011 FB_{153}	—	March 31, 2011	Mount Lemmon	Mount Lemmon Survey	H	490 m	MPC; JPL
553280	2011 FK_{158}	—	March 1, 2011	Mount Lemmon	Mount Lemmon Survey	·	1.4 km	MPC; JPL
553281	2011 FB_{161}	—	February 16, 2015	Haleakala	Pan-STARRS 1	·	1.3 km	MPC; JPL
553282	2011 FE_{161}	—	June 8, 2016	Haleakala	Pan-STARRS 1	(5)	1.1 km	MPC; JPL
553283	2011 FF_{161}	—	January 10, 2014	Mount Lemmon	Mount Lemmon Survey	·	470 m	MPC; JPL
553284	2011 FJ_{164}	—	January 26, 2015	Haleakala	Pan-STARRS 1	·	1.5 km	MPC; JPL
553285	2011 GH_{9}	—	December 19, 2004	Kitt Peak	Spacewatch	·	2.8 km	MPC; JPL
553286	2011 GV_{10}	—	November 18, 2006	Mount Lemmon	Mount Lemmon Survey	·	600 m	MPC; JPL
553287	2011 GP_{19}	—	May 24, 2007	Mount Lemmon	Mount Lemmon Survey	·	1.7 km	MPC; JPL
553288	2011 GK_{23}	—	April 4, 2011	Mount Lemmon	Mount Lemmon Survey	·	880 m	MPC; JPL
553289	2011 GJ_{26}	—	September 5, 2008	Kitt Peak	Spacewatch	·	1.9 km	MPC; JPL
553290	2011 GD_{29}	—	October 16, 2009	Mount Lemmon	Mount Lemmon Survey	·	500 m	MPC; JPL
553291	2011 GT_{33}	—	April 3, 2011	Haleakala	Pan-STARRS 1	·	1.5 km	MPC; JPL
553292	2011 GC_{39}	—	October 16, 2009	Mount Lemmon	Mount Lemmon Survey	·	630 m	MPC; JPL
553293	2011 GX_{43}	—	September 28, 2008	Mount Lemmon	Mount Lemmon Survey	·	1.6 km	MPC; JPL
553294	2011 GB_{52}	—	September 9, 2008	Mount Lemmon	Mount Lemmon Survey	KOR	1.2 km	MPC; JPL
553295	2011 GJ_{54}	—	March 11, 2011	Kitt Peak	Spacewatch	·	1.5 km	MPC; JPL
553296	2011 GR_{61}	—	September 3, 2005	Catalina	CSS	·	810 m	MPC; JPL
553297	2011 GV_{63}	—	October 17, 2003	Kitt Peak	Spacewatch	·	3.5 km	MPC; JPL
553298	2011 GZ_{70}	—	March 28, 2011	Kitt Peak	Spacewatch	H	320 m	MPC; JPL
553299	2011 GA_{74}	—	April 2, 2011	Kitt Peak	Spacewatch	·	1.8 km	MPC; JPL
553300	2011 GL_{74}	—	April 1, 2011	Kitt Peak	Spacewatch	·	530 m	MPC; JPL

== 553301–553400 ==
back to top

Designation			Discovery			Properties		Ref
Permanent	Provisional	Named after	Date	Site	Discoverer(s)	Category	Diam.	Ref
553301	2011 GD_{80}	—	October 12, 2009	Mount Lemmon	Mount Lemmon Survey	·	740 m	MPC; JPL
553302	2011 GF_{81}	—	April 13, 2011	Mount Lemmon	Mount Lemmon Survey	·	2.2 km	MPC; JPL
553303	2011 GX_{84}	—	March 28, 2011	Kitt Peak	Spacewatch	·	2.5 km	MPC; JPL
553304	2011 GG_{91}	—	April 7, 2011	Kitt Peak	Spacewatch	·	660 m	MPC; JPL
553305	2011 GK_{91}	—	April 3, 2011	Haleakala	Pan-STARRS 1	MAR	860 m	MPC; JPL
553306	2011 GM_{93}	—	November 21, 2014	Haleakala	Pan-STARRS 1	·	1.9 km	MPC; JPL
553307	2011 GL_{95}	—	April 13, 2011	Mount Lemmon	Mount Lemmon Survey	·	2.2 km	MPC; JPL
553308	2011 GN_{96}	—	April 1, 2011	Mount Lemmon	Mount Lemmon Survey	·	2.6 km	MPC; JPL
553309	2011 GU_{98}	—	February 4, 2016	Haleakala	Pan-STARRS 1	TIR	2.0 km	MPC; JPL
553310	2011 GC_{100}	—	April 3, 2011	Haleakala	Pan-STARRS 1	·	850 m	MPC; JPL
553311	2011 GN_{102}	—	April 1, 2011	Mount Lemmon	Mount Lemmon Survey	PHO	680 m	MPC; JPL
553312	2011 HX_{1}	—	February 23, 2011	Kitt Peak	Spacewatch	·	580 m	MPC; JPL
553313	2011 HX_{8}	—	March 27, 2011	Kitt Peak	Spacewatch	BRA	1.6 km	MPC; JPL
553314	2011 HD_{12}	—	April 22, 2011	Kitt Peak	Spacewatch	·	720 m	MPC; JPL
553315	2011 HG_{15}	—	April 23, 2011	Haleakala	Pan-STARRS 1	3:2	4.9 km	MPC; JPL
553316	2011 HK_{25}	—	August 25, 2005	Palomar	NEAT	·	650 m	MPC; JPL
553317	2011 HW_{40}	—	December 17, 2009	Kitt Peak	Spacewatch	·	780 m	MPC; JPL
553318	2011 HJ_{50}	—	April 30, 2011	Kitt Peak	Spacewatch	·	1.4 km	MPC; JPL
553319	2011 HO_{51}	—	May 24, 2001	Apache Point	SDSS Collaboration	·	470 m	MPC; JPL
553320	2011 HC_{69}	—	March 24, 2006	Mount Lemmon	Mount Lemmon Survey	·	1.5 km	MPC; JPL
553321	2011 HU_{71}	—	April 26, 2011	Kitt Peak	Spacewatch	H	320 m	MPC; JPL
553322	2011 HM_{73}	—	April 27, 2011	Kitt Peak	Spacewatch	·	1.7 km	MPC; JPL
553323	2011 HM_{76}	—	August 20, 2001	Cerro Tololo	Deep Ecliptic Survey	·	1.8 km	MPC; JPL
553324	2011 HS_{83}	—	April 14, 2004	Kitt Peak	Spacewatch	·	900 m	MPC; JPL
553325	2011 HW_{84}	—	March 13, 2005	Mount Lemmon	Mount Lemmon Survey	TIR	2.7 km	MPC; JPL
553326	2011 HL_{88}	—	September 6, 2008	Mount Lemmon	Mount Lemmon Survey	MAS	590 m	MPC; JPL
553327	2011 HU_{98}	—	April 30, 2011	Kitt Peak	Spacewatch	EOS	1.8 km	MPC; JPL
553328	2011 HZ_{104}	—	October 10, 2008	Mount Lemmon	Mount Lemmon Survey	·	2.8 km	MPC; JPL
553329	2011 HT_{105}	—	January 4, 2016	Haleakala	Pan-STARRS 1	·	2.4 km	MPC; JPL
553330	2011 HS_{106}	—	April 28, 2011	Kitt Peak	Spacewatch	H	410 m	MPC; JPL
553331	2011 HC_{108}	—	February 9, 2015	Mount Lemmon	Mount Lemmon Survey	·	1.8 km	MPC; JPL
553332	2011 HB_{109}	—	July 25, 2015	Haleakala	Pan-STARRS 1	·	530 m	MPC; JPL
553333	2011 HG_{109}	—	January 27, 2015	Haleakala	Pan-STARRS 1	·	1.4 km	MPC; JPL
553334	2011 JN_{9}	—	April 28, 2011	Haleakala	Pan-STARRS 1	·	550 m	MPC; JPL
553335	2011 JF_{13}	—	May 7, 2011	Kitt Peak	Spacewatch	·	2.1 km	MPC; JPL
553336	2011 JH_{13}	—	April 28, 2011	Haleakala	Pan-STARRS 1	H	430 m	MPC; JPL
553337	2011 JL_{14}	—	May 8, 2011	Kitt Peak	Spacewatch	·	1.9 km	MPC; JPL
553338	2011 JP_{15}	—	May 13, 2011	Haleakala	Pan-STARRS 1	PHO	990 m	MPC; JPL
553339	2011 JP_{22}	—	October 27, 2008	Mount Lemmon	Mount Lemmon Survey	·	2.1 km	MPC; JPL
553340	2011 JU_{23}	—	May 23, 2006	Kitt Peak	Spacewatch	·	1.7 km	MPC; JPL
553341	2011 JF_{24}	—	May 1, 2011	Haleakala	Pan-STARRS 1	·	2.5 km	MPC; JPL
553342	2011 JJ_{24}	—	October 26, 2008	Mount Lemmon	Mount Lemmon Survey	·	1.7 km	MPC; JPL
553343	2011 JL_{30}	—	September 19, 2003	Palomar	NEAT	HOF	3.5 km	MPC; JPL
553344	2011 JN_{30}	—	September 6, 2008	Mount Lemmon	Mount Lemmon Survey	·	500 m	MPC; JPL
553345	2011 JH_{35}	—	May 1, 2011	Haleakala	Pan-STARRS 1	·	2.9 km	MPC; JPL
553346	2011 KS	—	March 8, 2003	Kitt Peak	Spacewatch	·	1.1 km	MPC; JPL
553347	2011 KY_{1}	—	May 21, 2011	Mount Lemmon	Mount Lemmon Survey	·	1.4 km	MPC; JPL
553348	2011 KC_{3}	—	May 21, 2011	Mount Lemmon	Mount Lemmon Survey	H	480 m	MPC; JPL
553349	2011 KN_{3}	—	April 26, 2006	Kitt Peak	Spacewatch	·	2.0 km	MPC; JPL
553350	2011 KT_{10}	—	October 22, 2005	Catalina	CSS	·	670 m	MPC; JPL
553351	2011 KA_{16}	—	May 22, 2011	Mount Lemmon	Mount Lemmon Survey	·	2.9 km	MPC; JPL
553352	2011 KC_{16}	—	May 22, 2011	Mount Lemmon	Mount Lemmon Survey	·	1.8 km	MPC; JPL
553353	2011 KB_{19}	—	May 29, 2011	ESA OGS	ESA OGS	·	2.0 km	MPC; JPL
553354	2011 KH_{19}	—	May 28, 2011	Nogales	M. Schwartz, P. R. Holvorcem	H	590 m	MPC; JPL
553355	2011 KU_{19}	—	May 31, 2011	Mount Lemmon	Mount Lemmon Survey	H	500 m	MPC; JPL
553356	2011 KF_{22}	—	December 30, 2007	Kitt Peak	Spacewatch	H	450 m	MPC; JPL
553357	2011 KR_{24}	—	May 12, 2011	Mount Lemmon	Mount Lemmon Survey	·	520 m	MPC; JPL
553358	2011 KX_{24}	—	February 26, 2004	Kitt Peak	Deep Ecliptic Survey	·	510 m	MPC; JPL
553359	2011 KG_{30}	—	August 21, 2008	Kitt Peak	Spacewatch	·	470 m	MPC; JPL
553360	2011 KR_{35}	—	May 30, 2011	Haleakala	Pan-STARRS 1	·	2.8 km	MPC; JPL
553361	2011 KE_{36}	—	May 31, 2011	Mount Lemmon	Mount Lemmon Survey	H	300 m	MPC; JPL
553362	2011 KN_{39}	—	May 24, 2011	Haleakala	Pan-STARRS 1	EOS	1.6 km	MPC; JPL
553363	2011 KQ_{39}	—	May 24, 2011	Haleakala	Pan-STARRS 1	·	2.0 km	MPC; JPL
553364	2011 KT_{39}	—	May 24, 2011	Haleakala	Pan-STARRS 1	·	530 m	MPC; JPL
553365	2011 KR_{49}	—	May 22, 2011	Nogales	M. Schwartz, P. R. Holvorcem	·	1 km	MPC; JPL
553366	2011 KV_{49}	—	May 23, 2011	Mount Lemmon	Mount Lemmon Survey	·	2.3 km	MPC; JPL
553367	2011 KK_{50}	—	May 29, 2011	Mount Lemmon	Mount Lemmon Survey	·	3.7 km	MPC; JPL
553368	2011 KF_{53}	—	February 10, 2015	Mount Lemmon	Mount Lemmon Survey	EOS	1.4 km	MPC; JPL
553369	2011 KZ_{54}	—	April 12, 2016	Haleakala	Pan-STARRS 1	·	1.7 km	MPC; JPL
553370	2011 KM_{56}	—	May 26, 2011	Mount Lemmon	Mount Lemmon Survey	·	2.5 km	MPC; JPL
553371	2011 LQ_{3}	—	September 30, 2008	Catalina	CSS	PHO	570 m	MPC; JPL
553372	2011 LG_{4}	—	June 4, 2011	Mount Lemmon	Mount Lemmon Survey	EOS	1.4 km	MPC; JPL
553373	2011 LW_{10}	—	November 11, 2006	Kitt Peak	Spacewatch	H	650 m	MPC; JPL
553374	2011 LV_{17}	—	June 4, 2011	Mount Lemmon	Mount Lemmon Survey	EOS	1.9 km	MPC; JPL
553375	2011 LD_{23}	—	June 4, 2011	Mount Lemmon	Mount Lemmon Survey	EOS	1.4 km	MPC; JPL
553376	2011 LG_{23}	—	May 21, 2011	Mount Lemmon	Mount Lemmon Survey	EOS	1.4 km	MPC; JPL
553377	2011 LB_{25}	—	October 25, 2005	Kitt Peak	Spacewatch	·	550 m	MPC; JPL
553378	2011 LR_{25}	—	November 3, 2008	Mount Lemmon	Mount Lemmon Survey	·	2.0 km	MPC; JPL
553379	2011 LV_{27}	—	June 6, 2011	Haleakala	Pan-STARRS 1	·	540 m	MPC; JPL
553380	2011 LB_{29}	—	August 5, 2005	Palomar	NEAT	·	3.6 km	MPC; JPL
553381	2011 LT_{30}	—	December 24, 2013	Mount Lemmon	Mount Lemmon Survey	(10369)	980 m	MPC; JPL
553382	2011 LG_{34}	—	June 4, 2011	Mount Lemmon	Mount Lemmon Survey	·	2.8 km	MPC; JPL
553383	2011 LO_{34}	—	June 6, 2011	Mount Lemmon	Mount Lemmon Survey	V	540 m	MPC; JPL
553384	2011 ME_{1}	—	February 12, 2000	Apache Point	SDSS Collaboration	·	920 m	MPC; JPL
553385	2011 MM_{11}	—	June 26, 2011	Mount Lemmon	Mount Lemmon Survey	·	2.1 km	MPC; JPL
553386	2011 MO_{11}	—	June 22, 2011	Mount Lemmon	Mount Lemmon Survey	·	1.9 km	MPC; JPL
553387	2011 MX_{11}	—	June 23, 2011	Mount Lemmon	Mount Lemmon Survey	EMA	2.8 km	MPC; JPL
553388	2011 MC_{12}	—	October 17, 2012	Mount Lemmon	Mount Lemmon Survey	·	3.2 km	MPC; JPL
553389	2011 MG_{12}	—	January 22, 2015	Haleakala	Pan-STARRS 1	·	2.4 km	MPC; JPL
553390	2011 MR_{12}	—	January 10, 2013	Haleakala	Pan-STARRS 1	·	1.1 km	MPC; JPL
553391	2011 ML_{14}	—	June 25, 2011	Kitt Peak	Spacewatch	·	1.9 km	MPC; JPL
553392	2011 MS_{14}	—	June 28, 2011	Bergisch Gladbach	W. Bickel	L5	8.0 km	MPC; JPL
553393	2011 NR_{4}	—	August 13, 2012	Haleakala	Pan-STARRS 1	L5	6.7 km	MPC; JPL
553394	2011 NL_{5}	—	July 1, 2011	Mount Lemmon	Mount Lemmon Survey	EUN	840 m	MPC; JPL
553395	2011 OV	—	June 3, 2011	Mount Lemmon	Mount Lemmon Survey	·	2.5 km	MPC; JPL
553396	2011 OM_{1}	—	July 22, 2011	Haleakala	Haleakala	·	1.1 km	MPC; JPL
553397	2011 OZ_{4}	—	October 10, 2008	Mount Lemmon	Mount Lemmon Survey	·	730 m	MPC; JPL
553398	2011 OC_{9}	—	October 19, 2006	Kitt Peak	Spacewatch	VER	2.2 km	MPC; JPL
553399	2011 OM_{17}	—	July 28, 2011	Haleakala	Pan-STARRS 1	·	500 m	MPC; JPL
553400	2011 OP_{21}	—	February 22, 2009	Kitt Peak	Spacewatch	VER	3.0 km	MPC; JPL

== 553401–553500 ==
back to top

Designation			Discovery			Properties		Ref
Permanent	Provisional	Named after	Date	Site	Discoverer(s)	Category	Diam.	Ref
553401	2011 OY_{24}	—	July 1, 2011	Mount Lemmon	Mount Lemmon Survey	·	1.0 km	MPC; JPL
553402	2011 OO_{26}	—	July 27, 2011	Haleakala	Pan-STARRS 1	L5	7.9 km	MPC; JPL
553403	2011 OB_{27}	—	September 21, 2008	Kitt Peak	Spacewatch	·	700 m	MPC; JPL
553404	2011 OF_{29}	—	October 17, 2006	Catalina	CSS	·	3.9 km	MPC; JPL
553405	2011 OL_{34}	—	October 10, 2004	Kitt Peak	Spacewatch	NYS	950 m	MPC; JPL
553406	2011 ON_{36}	—	November 1, 2008	Kitt Peak	Spacewatch	·	780 m	MPC; JPL
553407	2011 OO_{37}	—	October 2, 2008	Mount Lemmon	Mount Lemmon Survey	·	620 m	MPC; JPL
553408	2011 OH_{40}	—	July 26, 2011	Haleakala	Pan-STARRS 1	L5	7.4 km	MPC; JPL
553409	2011 OQ_{40}	—	May 29, 2000	Kitt Peak	Spacewatch	·	2.1 km	MPC; JPL
553410	2011 OA_{41}	—	July 27, 2011	Haleakala	Pan-STARRS 1	·	2.7 km	MPC; JPL
553411	2011 OJ_{46}	—	May 15, 2004	Campo Imperatore	CINEOS	·	470 m	MPC; JPL
553412	2011 OR_{46}	—	June 30, 2000	La Silla	Barbieri, C.	·	800 m	MPC; JPL
553413	2011 OH_{50}	—	July 31, 2011	Haleakala	Pan-STARRS 1	·	880 m	MPC; JPL
553414	2011 OD_{52}	—	December 31, 2002	Kitt Peak	Spacewatch	·	4.7 km	MPC; JPL
553415	2011 OF_{56}	—	July 27, 2011	Siding Spring	SSS	·	2.3 km	MPC; JPL
553416	2011 OO_{58}	—	December 12, 2006	Kitt Peak	Spacewatch	T_{j} (2.97)	4.3 km	MPC; JPL
553417	2011 OB_{61}	—	July 27, 2011	Haleakala	Pan-STARRS 1	·	1.8 km	MPC; JPL
553418	2011 OK_{62}	—	July 27, 2011	Haleakala	Pan-STARRS 1	(2076)	660 m	MPC; JPL
553419	2011 OM_{62}	—	December 24, 2013	Mount Lemmon	Mount Lemmon Survey	·	2.7 km	MPC; JPL
553420	2011 OP_{62}	—	July 26, 2011	Haleakala	Pan-STARRS 1	·	540 m	MPC; JPL
553421	2011 OJ_{63}	—	October 8, 2015	Haleakala	Pan-STARRS 1	L5	6.9 km	MPC; JPL
553422	2011 OK_{63}	—	July 27, 2011	Haleakala	Pan-STARRS 1	TIR	2.8 km	MPC; JPL
553423	2011 OW_{63}	—	July 28, 2011	Haleakala	Pan-STARRS 1	·	3.1 km	MPC; JPL
553424	2011 OZ_{69}	—	July 28, 2011	Haleakala	Pan-STARRS 1	L5	6.5 km	MPC; JPL
553425	2011 OL_{72}	—	July 25, 2011	Haleakala	Pan-STARRS 1	·	1.0 km	MPC; JPL
553426	2011 OK_{73}	—	July 26, 2011	Haleakala	Pan-STARRS 1	·	900 m	MPC; JPL
553427	2011 PF	—	September 12, 2004	Kitt Peak	Spacewatch	·	710 m	MPC; JPL
553428	2011 PA_{1}	—	February 24, 2006	Mount Lemmon	Mount Lemmon Survey	L5	10 km	MPC; JPL
553429	2011 PJ_{9}	—	August 10, 2011	Haleakala	Pan-STARRS 1	·	720 m	MPC; JPL
553430	2011 PP_{9}	—	May 10, 2005	Kitt Peak	Spacewatch	·	2.8 km	MPC; JPL
553431	2011 PN_{11}	—	September 28, 2006	Catalina	CSS	·	3.1 km	MPC; JPL
553432	2011 PB_{12}	—	August 3, 2011	ESA OGS	ESA OGS	·	700 m	MPC; JPL
553433	2011 PU_{12}	—	August 3, 2011	La Sagra	OAM	·	670 m	MPC; JPL
553434	2011 PV_{12}	—	July 26, 2011	Haleakala	Pan-STARRS 1	MAS	640 m	MPC; JPL
553435	2011 PV_{15}	—	September 20, 2014	Haleakala	Pan-STARRS 1	L5	6.4 km	MPC; JPL
553436	2011 PE_{20}	—	August 2, 2011	Haleakala	Pan-STARRS 1	·	3.2 km	MPC; JPL
553437	2011 QO_{3}	—	July 25, 2011	Haleakala	Pan-STARRS 1	L5	10 km	MPC; JPL
553438 Bércziszaniszló	2011 QA_{7}	Bércziszaniszló	August 9, 2011	Piszkéstető	K. Sárneczky, A. Pál	·	2.1 km	MPC; JPL
553439	2011 QB_{8}	—	August 22, 2004	Kitt Peak	Spacewatch	·	710 m	MPC; JPL
553440	2011 QF_{8}	—	April 14, 2004	Kitt Peak	Spacewatch	·	750 m	MPC; JPL
553441	2011 QY_{9}	—	August 20, 2011	Haleakala	Pan-STARRS 1	·	1.1 km	MPC; JPL
553442	2011 QA_{10}	—	September 29, 2006	Apache Point	SDSS Collaboration	·	2.3 km	MPC; JPL
553443	2011 QU_{12}	—	September 23, 1995	Kitt Peak	Spacewatch	·	2.3 km	MPC; JPL
553444	2011 QB_{15}	—	August 12, 2004	Cerro Tololo	Deep Ecliptic Survey	·	660 m	MPC; JPL
553445	2011 QJ_{15}	—	August 23, 2011	Haleakala	Pan-STARRS 1	·	910 m	MPC; JPL
553446	2011 QZ_{15}	—	January 31, 2009	Mount Lemmon	Mount Lemmon Survey	TIR	3.0 km	MPC; JPL
553447	2011 QG_{16}	—	August 23, 2011	Haleakala	Pan-STARRS 1	·	530 m	MPC; JPL
553448	2011 QJ_{17}	—	August 20, 2011	Haleakala	Pan-STARRS 1	NYS	960 m	MPC; JPL
553449	2011 QX_{18}	—	August 20, 2011	Haleakala	Pan-STARRS 1	·	550 m	MPC; JPL
553450	2011 QQ_{21}	—	October 6, 2004	Kitt Peak	Spacewatch	·	810 m	MPC; JPL
553451	2011 QE_{24}	—	March 3, 2009	Kitt Peak	Spacewatch	·	2.6 km	MPC; JPL
553452	2011 QA_{26}	—	September 17, 2006	Kitt Peak	Spacewatch	·	2.4 km	MPC; JPL
553453	2011 QV_{28}	—	August 23, 2011	Haleakala	Pan-STARRS 1	·	1.0 km	MPC; JPL
553454	2011 QT_{32}	—	February 15, 2002	Bohyunsan	Jeon, Y.-B., Hwang, H. S.	·	1.1 km	MPC; JPL
553455	2011 QC_{37}	—	August 27, 2011	Haleakala	Pan-STARRS 1	·	1.1 km	MPC; JPL
553456	2011 QK_{39}	—	September 9, 2004	Kitt Peak	Spacewatch	·	720 m	MPC; JPL
553457	2011 QV_{39}	—	August 23, 2011	Haleakala	Pan-STARRS 1	·	770 m	MPC; JPL
553458	2011 QZ_{39}	—	August 28, 2011	Dauban	C. Rinner, Kugel, F.	·	1.1 km	MPC; JPL
553459	2011 QL_{43}	—	January 15, 2008	Mount Lemmon	Mount Lemmon Survey	·	2.9 km	MPC; JPL
553460	2011 QG_{45}	—	August 28, 2011	Charleston	R. Holmes	·	570 m	MPC; JPL
553461	2011 QN_{45}	—	August 28, 2011	Haleakala	Pan-STARRS 1	·	1.7 km	MPC; JPL
553462	2011 QG_{47}	—	August 26, 2011	Piszkéstető	K. Sárneczky	·	3.4 km	MPC; JPL
553463	2011 QA_{52}	—	July 28, 2011	Haleakala	Pan-STARRS 1	·	710 m	MPC; JPL
553464	2011 QM_{53}	—	March 11, 2005	Mount Lemmon	Mount Lemmon Survey	·	1.6 km	MPC; JPL
553465	2011 QG_{54}	—	August 26, 2011	Kitt Peak	Spacewatch	ERI	1.2 km	MPC; JPL
553466	2011 QQ_{54}	—	August 30, 2011	Haleakala	Pan-STARRS 1	TIR	2.0 km	MPC; JPL
553467	2011 QV_{55}	—	October 7, 2004	Kitt Peak	Spacewatch	·	970 m	MPC; JPL
553468	2011 QJ_{56}	—	June 9, 2011	Mount Lemmon	Mount Lemmon Survey	·	3.0 km	MPC; JPL
553469	2011 QR_{60}	—	December 31, 2007	Kitt Peak	Spacewatch	·	4.0 km	MPC; JPL
553470	2011 QL_{64}	—	December 30, 2005	Kitt Peak	Spacewatch	·	1.3 km	MPC; JPL
553471	2011 QA_{69}	—	April 24, 2007	Kitt Peak	Spacewatch	·	780 m	MPC; JPL
553472	2011 QE_{72}	—	August 26, 2000	Cerro Tololo	Deep Ecliptic Survey	·	2.3 km	MPC; JPL
553473	2011 QW_{72}	—	September 30, 2000	Socorro	LINEAR	·	3.3 km	MPC; JPL
553474	2011 QQ_{75}	—	October 21, 2006	Mount Lemmon	Mount Lemmon Survey	HYG	2.8 km	MPC; JPL
553475	2011 QE_{77}	—	September 19, 2006	Kitt Peak	Spacewatch	·	2.0 km	MPC; JPL
553476	2011 QP_{77}	—	July 28, 2005	Palomar	NEAT	·	3.3 km	MPC; JPL
553477	2011 QR_{77}	—	January 26, 2009	Mount Lemmon	Mount Lemmon Survey	·	1.1 km	MPC; JPL
553478	2011 QR_{78}	—	August 23, 2011	Haleakala	Pan-STARRS 1	THM	2.5 km	MPC; JPL
553479	2011 QC_{80}	—	March 15, 2004	Kitt Peak	Spacewatch	·	2.8 km	MPC; JPL
553480	2011 QX_{83}	—	August 24, 2011	Haleakala	Pan-STARRS 1	H	350 m	MPC; JPL
553481	2011 QR_{85}	—	August 27, 2000	Cerro Tololo	Deep Ecliptic Survey	V	560 m	MPC; JPL
553482	2011 QW_{88}	—	July 27, 2011	Haleakala	Pan-STARRS 1	·	740 m	MPC; JPL
553483	2011 QW_{92}	—	August 30, 2011	Haleakala	Pan-STARRS 1	H	400 m	MPC; JPL
553484	2011 QV_{97}	—	September 15, 2006	Kitt Peak	Spacewatch	·	2.9 km	MPC; JPL
553485	2011 QD_{100}	—	October 2, 2006	Mount Lemmon	Mount Lemmon Survey	HYG	2.5 km	MPC; JPL
553486	2011 QN_{100}	—	October 29, 2008	Kitt Peak	Spacewatch	V	540 m	MPC; JPL
553487	2011 QO_{101}	—	October 19, 2012	Mount Lemmon	Mount Lemmon Survey	URS	3.4 km	MPC; JPL
553488	2011 QU_{101}	—	August 21, 2011	Haleakala	Pan-STARRS 1	·	2.4 km	MPC; JPL
553489	2011 QA_{103}	—	February 14, 2013	Haleakala	Pan-STARRS 1	·	860 m	MPC; JPL
553490	2011 QB_{104}	—	October 21, 2006	Kitt Peak	Spacewatch	·	2.2 km	MPC; JPL
553491	2011 QN_{105}	—	August 27, 2011	Haleakala	Pan-STARRS 1	·	1.9 km	MPC; JPL
553492	2011 QL_{106}	—	August 31, 2011	Haleakala	Pan-STARRS 1	·	1.5 km	MPC; JPL
553493	2011 QW_{107}	—	November 16, 2012	Haleakala	Pan-STARRS 1	·	2.5 km	MPC; JPL
553494	2011 QT_{109}	—	November 11, 2007	Mount Lemmon	Mount Lemmon Survey	·	2.9 km	MPC; JPL
553495	2011 RT_{4}	—	September 7, 2011	Kitt Peak	Spacewatch	HYG	2.5 km	MPC; JPL
553496	2011 RW_{5}	—	September 5, 2011	Haleakala	Pan-STARRS 1	·	1.0 km	MPC; JPL
553497	2011 RD_{9}	—	March 6, 2006	Kitt Peak	Spacewatch	·	960 m	MPC; JPL
553498	2011 RU_{9}	—	August 23, 2011	Haleakala	Pan-STARRS 1	·	720 m	MPC; JPL
553499	2011 RX_{9}	—	July 12, 2005	Mount Lemmon	Mount Lemmon Survey	·	3.9 km	MPC; JPL
553500	2011 RC_{13}	—	September 8, 2011	Haleakala	Pan-STARRS 1	·	790 m	MPC; JPL

== 553501–553600 ==
back to top

Designation			Discovery			Properties		Ref
Permanent	Provisional	Named after	Date	Site	Discoverer(s)	Category	Diam.	Ref
553501	2011 RO_{14}	—	September 4, 2011	Haleakala	Pan-STARRS 1	·	760 m	MPC; JPL
553502	2011 RE_{15}	—	June 5, 2005	Kitt Peak	Spacewatch	·	3.6 km	MPC; JPL
553503	2011 RM_{15}	—	August 30, 2011	Haleakala	Pan-STARRS 1	·	2.6 km	MPC; JPL
553504	2011 RU_{21}	—	September 4, 2011	Haleakala	Pan-STARRS 1	V	620 m	MPC; JPL
553505	2011 RV_{24}	—	September 1, 2011	Haleakala	Pan-STARRS 1	H	650 m	MPC; JPL
553506	2011 RH_{26}	—	September 4, 2011	Haleakala	Pan-STARRS 1	EOS	1.6 km	MPC; JPL
553507	2011 RT_{27}	—	September 4, 2011	Haleakala	Pan-STARRS 1	·	3.1 km	MPC; JPL
553508	2011 SX_{2}	—	August 8, 2005	Cerro Tololo	Deep Ecliptic Survey	HYG	2.3 km	MPC; JPL
553509	2011 SH_{5}	—	November 18, 2008	Kitt Peak	Spacewatch	·	780 m	MPC; JPL
553510	2011 SB_{7}	—	September 17, 2011	Haleakala	Pan-STARRS 1	·	2.8 km	MPC; JPL
553511	2011 SH_{14}	—	July 2, 2005	Kitt Peak	Spacewatch	·	2.9 km	MPC; JPL
553512	2011 SJ_{15}	—	August 31, 2011	Haleakala	Pan-STARRS 1	·	2.4 km	MPC; JPL
553513	2011 SR_{18}	—	September 28, 2006	Kitt Peak	Spacewatch	·	1.9 km	MPC; JPL
553514	2011 SK_{19}	—	September 19, 2011	Mount Lemmon	Mount Lemmon Survey	·	2.3 km	MPC; JPL
553515	2011 SL_{19}	—	July 5, 2005	Mount Lemmon	Mount Lemmon Survey	·	3.2 km	MPC; JPL
553516	2011 SQ_{23}	—	September 4, 2011	Haleakala	Pan-STARRS 1	·	1.2 km	MPC; JPL
553517	2011 SE_{26}	—	September 20, 2011	Haleakala	Pan-STARRS 1	H	430 m	MPC; JPL
553518	2011 SF_{30}	—	May 12, 1996	Kitt Peak	Spacewatch	·	1.1 km	MPC; JPL
553519	2011 SL_{33}	—	August 20, 2000	Kitt Peak	Spacewatch	·	1.1 km	MPC; JPL
553520	2011 SF_{37}	—	September 20, 2011	Kitt Peak	Spacewatch	·	960 m	MPC; JPL
553521	2011 SX_{39}	—	September 2, 2011	Haleakala	Pan-STARRS 1	NYS	990 m	MPC; JPL
553522	2011 SN_{49}	—	September 4, 2011	Haleakala	Pan-STARRS 1	·	1.0 km	MPC; JPL
553523	2011 SJ_{51}	—	January 20, 2009	Kitt Peak	Spacewatch	·	1.1 km	MPC; JPL
553524	2011 SJ_{53}	—	September 28, 2000	Kitt Peak	Spacewatch	·	850 m	MPC; JPL
553525	2011 SA_{55}	—	November 1, 2007	Mount Lemmon	Mount Lemmon Survey	·	960 m	MPC; JPL
553526	2011 SU_{56}	—	March 18, 2010	Kitt Peak	Spacewatch	CLA	1.3 km	MPC; JPL
553527	2011 SV_{57}	—	September 23, 2011	Haleakala	Pan-STARRS 1	·	2.8 km	MPC; JPL
553528	2011 SF_{59}	—	June 4, 2011	Cerro Tololo	Pozo, F., Colque, J. P.	·	2.9 km	MPC; JPL
553529	2011 SA_{62}	—	January 15, 2007	Mauna Kea	P. A. Wiegert	·	2.3 km	MPC; JPL
553530	2011 SM_{63}	—	October 11, 2001	Palomar	NEAT	·	740 m	MPC; JPL
553531	2011 SA_{68}	—	September 20, 2011	Catalina	CSS	PHO	830 m	MPC; JPL
553532 Alfiejohnpercy	2011 SB_{71}	Alfiejohnpercy	September 23, 2011	Mayhill	Falla, N.	·	1.2 km	MPC; JPL
553533	2011 SY_{74}	—	September 19, 2011	Haleakala	Pan-STARRS 1	·	620 m	MPC; JPL
553534	2011 SY_{83}	—	February 3, 2009	Mount Lemmon	Mount Lemmon Survey	·	1.1 km	MPC; JPL
553535	2011 SZ_{83}	—	September 21, 2011	Catalina	CSS	NYS	1.1 km	MPC; JPL
553536	2011 SM_{86}	—	September 21, 2011	Kitt Peak	Spacewatch	·	1.2 km	MPC; JPL
553537	2011 SQ_{89}	—	September 14, 2005	Kitt Peak	Spacewatch	HYG	2.9 km	MPC; JPL
553538	2011 SC_{90}	—	September 22, 2011	Kitt Peak	Spacewatch	·	790 m	MPC; JPL
553539	2011 SU_{93}	—	September 23, 2011	Kitt Peak	Spacewatch	·	950 m	MPC; JPL
553540	2011 SA_{97}	—	March 6, 2008	Mount Lemmon	Mount Lemmon Survey	·	3.0 km	MPC; JPL
553541	2011 SN_{97}	—	September 21, 2011	Kitt Peak	Spacewatch	·	960 m	MPC; JPL
553542	2011 SQ_{98}	—	September 23, 2011	Mount Lemmon	Mount Lemmon Survey	·	2.3 km	MPC; JPL
553543	2011 ST_{115}	—	July 18, 2005	Palomar	NEAT	·	3.4 km	MPC; JPL
553544	2011 SU_{128}	—	September 20, 2011	Kitt Peak	Spacewatch	·	2.3 km	MPC; JPL
553545	2011 SV_{128}	—	September 20, 2011	Kitt Peak	Spacewatch	MAS	540 m	MPC; JPL
553546	2011 SK_{131}	—	September 23, 2011	Haleakala	Pan-STARRS 1	·	930 m	MPC; JPL
553547	2011 SG_{133}	—	December 10, 2004	Kitt Peak	Spacewatch	MAS	670 m	MPC; JPL
553548	2011 SB_{143}	—	September 23, 2011	Haleakala	Pan-STARRS 1	·	620 m	MPC; JPL
553549	2011 SR_{143}	—	September 23, 2011	Haleakala	Pan-STARRS 1	PHO	670 m	MPC; JPL
553550	2011 SK_{147}	—	September 9, 2011	Kitt Peak	Spacewatch	NYS	720 m	MPC; JPL
553551	2011 SL_{147}	—	January 19, 2009	Mount Lemmon	Mount Lemmon Survey	MAS	640 m	MPC; JPL
553552	2011 SO_{147}	—	April 17, 2004	Palomar	NEAT	LIX	4.3 km	MPC; JPL
553553	2011 SH_{149}	—	July 12, 2005	Mount Lemmon	Mount Lemmon Survey	·	2.1 km	MPC; JPL
553554	2011 SM_{153}	—	September 22, 1995	Kitt Peak	Spacewatch	·	1.8 km	MPC; JPL
553555	2011 SV_{153}	—	December 13, 2004	Kitt Peak	Spacewatch	NYS	960 m	MPC; JPL
553556	2011 SE_{158}	—	October 15, 2004	Mount Lemmon	Mount Lemmon Survey	NYS	940 m	MPC; JPL
553557	2011 SC_{161}	—	September 23, 2011	Kitt Peak	Spacewatch	·	740 m	MPC; JPL
553558	2011 SH_{165}	—	March 7, 2003	Kitt Peak	Deep Lens Survey	·	2.9 km	MPC; JPL
553559	2011 SQ_{167}	—	June 30, 2005	Kitt Peak	Spacewatch	HYG	2.4 km	MPC; JPL
553560	2011 SV_{172}	—	September 4, 2007	Catalina	CSS	MAS	610 m	MPC; JPL
553561	2011 SZ_{175}	—	September 26, 2011	Haleakala	Pan-STARRS 1	·	910 m	MPC; JPL
553562	2011 SG_{177}	—	November 12, 2007	Mount Lemmon	Mount Lemmon Survey	·	1.1 km	MPC; JPL
553563	2011 SJ_{179}	—	September 26, 2011	Kitt Peak	Spacewatch	EUN	880 m	MPC; JPL
553564	2011 SB_{180}	—	March 18, 2010	Mount Lemmon	Mount Lemmon Survey	·	930 m	MPC; JPL
553565	2011 SE_{184}	—	October 6, 2000	Kitt Peak	Spacewatch	·	780 m	MPC; JPL
553566	2011 SP_{187}	—	September 22, 2011	Kitt Peak	Spacewatch	·	940 m	MPC; JPL
553567	2011 SW_{190}	—	August 26, 2005	Palomar	NEAT	·	2.6 km	MPC; JPL
553568	2011 SW_{191}	—	March 22, 2009	Mount Lemmon	Mount Lemmon Survey	·	2.3 km	MPC; JPL
553569	2011 SH_{194}	—	December 19, 2004	Mount Lemmon	Mount Lemmon Survey	NYS	1.2 km	MPC; JPL
553570	2011 SO_{197}	—	February 7, 2002	Palomar	NEAT	CLA	1.6 km	MPC; JPL
553571	2011 SE_{200}	—	March 6, 2006	Kitt Peak	Spacewatch	·	1.0 km	MPC; JPL
553572	2011 SB_{201}	—	February 18, 2010	Mount Lemmon	Mount Lemmon Survey	V	570 m	MPC; JPL
553573	2011 SO_{202}	—	September 13, 2007	Mount Lemmon	Mount Lemmon Survey	·	1.3 km	MPC; JPL
553574	2011 ST_{204}	—	March 3, 2009	Kitt Peak	Spacewatch	·	2.8 km	MPC; JPL
553575	2011 SZ_{212}	—	September 21, 2011	Haleakala	Pan-STARRS 1	·	3.6 km	MPC; JPL
553576	2011 SN_{214}	—	April 19, 2006	Mount Lemmon	Mount Lemmon Survey	·	1.3 km	MPC; JPL
553577	2011 SZ_{214}	—	September 21, 2011	Kitt Peak	Spacewatch	·	940 m	MPC; JPL
553578	2011 SR_{216}	—	September 6, 2011	Bisei	BATTeRS	·	920 m	MPC; JPL
553579	2011 SB_{221}	—	September 26, 2011	Haleakala	Pan-STARRS 1	H	390 m	MPC; JPL
553580	2011 SG_{223}	—	September 28, 2011	Kitt Peak	Spacewatch	·	1.1 km	MPC; JPL
553581	2011 SE_{224}	—	September 21, 2011	Kitt Peak	Spacewatch	·	680 m	MPC; JPL
553582	2011 SW_{226}	—	May 1, 2006	Kitt Peak	Spacewatch	·	1.1 km	MPC; JPL
553583	2011 SE_{239}	—	July 5, 2005	Kitt Peak	Spacewatch	·	1.9 km	MPC; JPL
553584	2011 SN_{239}	—	September 26, 2011	Mount Lemmon	Mount Lemmon Survey	·	2.4 km	MPC; JPL
553585	2011 SF_{242}	—	March 21, 2009	Mount Lemmon	Mount Lemmon Survey	·	2.5 km	MPC; JPL
553586	2011 SK_{242}	—	September 26, 2011	Mount Lemmon	Mount Lemmon Survey	·	1.5 km	MPC; JPL
553587	2011 SF_{243}	—	September 26, 2011	Haleakala	Pan-STARRS 1	·	890 m	MPC; JPL
553588	2011 SF_{244}	—	April 2, 2009	Mount Lemmon	Mount Lemmon Survey	·	2.7 km	MPC; JPL
553589	2011 SP_{245}	—	October 20, 2003	Socorro	LINEAR	H	640 m	MPC; JPL
553590	2011 SS_{253}	—	September 10, 2004	Kitt Peak	Spacewatch	·	700 m	MPC; JPL
553591	2011 SR_{256}	—	September 21, 2011	Kitt Peak	Spacewatch	·	550 m	MPC; JPL
553592	2011 SF_{259}	—	October 1, 1995	Kitt Peak	Spacewatch	·	2.3 km	MPC; JPL
553593	2011 SC_{263}	—	August 27, 2011	Haleakala	Pan-STARRS 1	·	1.3 km	MPC; JPL
553594	2011 SJ_{263}	—	March 12, 2010	Kitt Peak	Spacewatch	·	750 m	MPC; JPL
553595	2011 SW_{264}	—	July 2, 2006	Mauna Kea	D. J. Tholen	VER	2.3 km	MPC; JPL
553596	2011 SR_{268}	—	September 23, 2011	Mount Lemmon	Mount Lemmon Survey	URS	2.3 km	MPC; JPL
553597	2011 SR_{269}	—	October 5, 2004	Kitt Peak	Spacewatch	·	620 m	MPC; JPL
553598	2011 ST_{272}	—	August 30, 2005	Kitt Peak	Spacewatch	·	3.9 km	MPC; JPL
553599	2011 SJ_{274}	—	October 11, 2004	Kitt Peak	Spacewatch	·	940 m	MPC; JPL
553600	2011 SD_{278}	—	September 19, 2011	Mount Lemmon	Mount Lemmon Survey	·	2.5 km	MPC; JPL

== 553601–553700 ==
back to top

Designation			Discovery			Properties		Ref
Permanent	Provisional	Named after	Date	Site	Discoverer(s)	Category	Diam.	Ref
553601	2011 SX_{282}	—	September 21, 2011	Mount Lemmon	Mount Lemmon Survey	·	2.8 km	MPC; JPL
553602	2011 SS_{284}	—	January 20, 2013	Kitt Peak	Spacewatch	·	930 m	MPC; JPL
553603	2011 SJ_{285}	—	February 16, 2013	Kitt Peak	Spacewatch	·	1.0 km	MPC; JPL
553604	2011 SL_{286}	—	September 21, 2011	Mount Lemmon	Mount Lemmon Survey	THM	2.4 km	MPC; JPL
553605	2011 SZ_{286}	—	May 30, 2014	Haleakala	Pan-STARRS 1	V	480 m	MPC; JPL
553606	2011 SD_{292}	—	September 20, 2011	Haleakala	Pan-STARRS 1	EUN	930 m	MPC; JPL
553607	2011 SR_{295}	—	September 4, 2004	Kleť	J. Tichá, M. Tichý	·	600 m	MPC; JPL
553608	2011 SX_{295}	—	August 7, 1999	Kitt Peak	Spacewatch	·	2.6 km	MPC; JPL
553609	2011 SW_{296}	—	September 23, 2011	Haleakala	Pan-STARRS 1	·	1.5 km	MPC; JPL
553610	2011 SY_{296}	—	January 17, 2013	Haleakala	Pan-STARRS 1	·	1.1 km	MPC; JPL
553611	2011 SM_{297}	—	May 21, 2015	Haleakala	Pan-STARRS 1	·	2.5 km	MPC; JPL
553612	2011 SH_{302}	—	September 20, 2011	Kitt Peak	Spacewatch	·	780 m	MPC; JPL
553613	2011 SM_{308}	—	September 25, 2011	Haleakala	Pan-STARRS 1	V	630 m	MPC; JPL
553614	2011 SF_{309}	—	September 30, 2011	Mount Lemmon	Mount Lemmon Survey	HOF	1.8 km	MPC; JPL
553615	2011 SS_{309}	—	September 23, 2011	Haleakala	Pan-STARRS 1	·	3.2 km	MPC; JPL
553616	2011 ST_{313}	—	September 19, 2011	Mount Lemmon	Mount Lemmon Survey	·	1.2 km	MPC; JPL
553617	2011 SQ_{321}	—	September 20, 2011	Mount Lemmon	Mount Lemmon Survey	·	1.0 km	MPC; JPL
553618	2011 SL_{323}	—	September 21, 2011	Mount Lemmon	Mount Lemmon Survey	VER	2.1 km	MPC; JPL
553619	2011 SX_{324}	—	September 25, 2011	Haleakala	Pan-STARRS 1	EUN	910 m	MPC; JPL
553620	2011 TK_{6}	—	September 25, 2000	Kitt Peak	Spacewatch	NYS	1.4 km	MPC; JPL
553621	2011 TY_{9}	—	July 28, 2005	Palomar	NEAT	·	3.2 km	MPC; JPL
553622	2011 TJ_{11}	—	September 20, 2011	Kitt Peak	Spacewatch	V	690 m	MPC; JPL
553623	2011 TN_{13}	—	July 4, 2005	Palomar	NEAT	·	3.2 km	MPC; JPL
553624	2011 TW_{13}	—	August 28, 2005	Kitt Peak	Spacewatch	·	3.4 km	MPC; JPL
553625	2011 TD_{14}	—	October 5, 2011	Haleakala	Pan-STARRS 1	·	1.1 km	MPC; JPL
553626	2011 TW_{18}	—	May 22, 2015	Haleakala	Pan-STARRS 1	·	2.5 km	MPC; JPL
553627	2011 TF_{19}	—	October 3, 2011	Piszkéstető	K. Sárneczky	H	490 m	MPC; JPL
553628	2011 TY_{19}	—	May 20, 2014	Haleakala	Pan-STARRS 1	·	1.0 km	MPC; JPL
553629	2011 TB_{20}	—	October 1, 2011	Kitt Peak	Spacewatch	·	2.2 km	MPC; JPL
553630	2011 TR_{21}	—	October 1, 2011	Mount Lemmon	Mount Lemmon Survey	·	1.3 km	MPC; JPL
553631	2011 UV_{1}	—	September 4, 2007	Mount Lemmon	Mount Lemmon Survey	·	950 m	MPC; JPL
553632	2011 UE_{3}	—	September 12, 2007	Kitt Peak	Spacewatch	·	1.0 km	MPC; JPL
553633	2011 UP_{5}	—	October 18, 2011	Mount Lemmon	Mount Lemmon Survey	V	480 m	MPC; JPL
553634	2011 US_{5}	—	October 15, 2007	Kitt Peak	Spacewatch	·	1 km	MPC; JPL
553635	2011 UZ_{7}	—	November 10, 2004	Kitt Peak	Deep Ecliptic Survey	·	1 km	MPC; JPL
553636	2011 UU_{8}	—	September 14, 2007	Kitt Peak	Spacewatch	·	1.0 km	MPC; JPL
553637	2011 UC_{10}	—	January 15, 2005	Kitt Peak	Spacewatch	NYS	1.3 km	MPC; JPL
553638	2011 UN_{14}	—	June 25, 2005	Palomar	NEAT	·	2.7 km	MPC; JPL
553639	2011 UE_{18}	—	October 19, 2011	Kitt Peak	Spacewatch	ERI	1.3 km	MPC; JPL
553640	2011 UU_{21}	—	December 7, 2008	Kitt Peak	Spacewatch	·	1.2 km	MPC; JPL
553641	2011 UY_{24}	—	November 12, 2007	Bisei	BATTeRS	·	1.4 km	MPC; JPL
553642	2011 UW_{25}	—	September 23, 2011	Kitt Peak	Spacewatch	·	1.2 km	MPC; JPL
553643	2011 UN_{26}	—	October 17, 2011	Kitt Peak	Spacewatch	H	430 m	MPC; JPL
553644	2011 UD_{27}	—	September 12, 2007	Catalina	CSS	·	1.1 km	MPC; JPL
553645	2011 UG_{28}	—	September 20, 2003	Kitt Peak	Spacewatch	·	1.4 km	MPC; JPL
553646	2011 UD_{30}	—	September 16, 2007	Lulin	LUSS	·	1.0 km	MPC; JPL
553647	2011 UD_{37}	—	February 24, 2009	Mount Lemmon	Mount Lemmon Survey	·	1.3 km	MPC; JPL
553648	2011 UW_{42}	—	September 21, 2011	Kitt Peak	Spacewatch	·	2.8 km	MPC; JPL
553649	2011 UE_{43}	—	July 7, 2007	Lulin	LUSS	NYS	1.3 km	MPC; JPL
553650	2011 UM_{43}	—	September 30, 2011	Kitt Peak	Spacewatch	·	1.2 km	MPC; JPL
553651	2011 UD_{46}	—	September 11, 2007	Mount Lemmon	Mount Lemmon Survey	NYS	1.0 km	MPC; JPL
553652	2011 UJ_{46}	—	August 11, 2007	Anderson Mesa	LONEOS	·	990 m	MPC; JPL
553653	2011 UB_{56}	—	January 16, 2005	Mauna Kea	Veillet, C.	·	980 m	MPC; JPL
553654	2011 UJ_{56}	—	August 14, 2007	Siding Spring	SSS	·	910 m	MPC; JPL
553655	2011 UU_{57}	—	February 20, 2009	Kitt Peak	Spacewatch	KOR	1.3 km	MPC; JPL
553656	2011 UL_{61}	—	November 13, 2007	Mount Lemmon	Mount Lemmon Survey	·	1.0 km	MPC; JPL
553657	2011 UB_{63}	—	November 20, 2003	Socorro	LINEAR	·	730 m	MPC; JPL
553658	2011 UJ_{63}	—	October 20, 2011	Haleakala	Pan-STARRS 1	H	590 m	MPC; JPL
553659	2011 UB_{75}	—	September 20, 2011	Kitt Peak	Spacewatch	THM	1.8 km	MPC; JPL
553660	2011 UX_{77}	—	October 19, 2011	Kitt Peak	Spacewatch	H	570 m	MPC; JPL
553661	2011 UW_{101}	—	September 12, 2007	Catalina	CSS	NYS	960 m	MPC; JPL
553662	2011 UA_{102}	—	September 24, 2011	Mount Lemmon	Mount Lemmon Survey	MAR	690 m	MPC; JPL
553663	2011 UW_{104}	—	December 1, 2008	Mount Lemmon	Mount Lemmon Survey	V	770 m	MPC; JPL
553664	2011 UZ_{109}	—	October 23, 2006	Kitt Peak	Spacewatch	EOS	2.0 km	MPC; JPL
553665	2011 UU_{111}	—	October 16, 2011	Kitt Peak	Spacewatch	·	1.7 km	MPC; JPL
553666	2011 UG_{114}	—	October 21, 2011	Mount Lemmon	Mount Lemmon Survey	·	960 m	MPC; JPL
553667	2011 UV_{115}	—	September 23, 2011	Kitt Peak	Spacewatch	VER	2.4 km	MPC; JPL
553668	2011 UH_{125}	—	October 19, 2011	Mount Lemmon	Mount Lemmon Survey	TIR	2.5 km	MPC; JPL
553669	2011 UP_{135}	—	October 29, 2003	Kitt Peak	Spacewatch	H	370 m	MPC; JPL
553670	2011 UH_{138}	—	June 19, 2002	Kitt Peak	Spacewatch	EUN	1.2 km	MPC; JPL
553671	2011 UT_{138}	—	September 13, 2007	Mount Lemmon	Mount Lemmon Survey	·	910 m	MPC; JPL
553672	2011 UV_{139}	—	September 29, 2011	Mount Lemmon	Mount Lemmon Survey	·	1.2 km	MPC; JPL
553673	2011 UV_{140}	—	August 5, 2007	Lulin	LUSS	NYS	1.1 km	MPC; JPL
553674	2011 UA_{142}	—	October 23, 2011	Mount Lemmon	Mount Lemmon Survey	·	2.8 km	MPC; JPL
553675	2011 UD_{142}	—	August 29, 2005	Palomar	NEAT	·	2.6 km	MPC; JPL
553676	2011 UB_{143}	—	December 6, 2007	Kitt Peak	Spacewatch	·	880 m	MPC; JPL
553677	2011 UO_{143}	—	October 23, 2011	Haleakala	Pan-STARRS 1	·	1.3 km	MPC; JPL
553678	2011 US_{146}	—	October 19, 2007	Catalina	CSS	PHO	760 m	MPC; JPL
553679	2011 UP_{153}	—	October 2, 2000	Anderson Mesa	LONEOS	·	1.1 km	MPC; JPL
553680	2011 UK_{155}	—	October 19, 2007	Catalina	CSS	·	1.2 km	MPC; JPL
553681	2011 UZ_{161}	—	October 6, 2000	Haleakala	NEAT	·	1.2 km	MPC; JPL
553682	2011 UC_{165}	—	October 10, 2007	Mount Lemmon	Mount Lemmon Survey	·	980 m	MPC; JPL
553683	2011 UU_{167}	—	October 20, 2007	Mount Lemmon	Mount Lemmon Survey	·	950 m	MPC; JPL
553684	2011 UN_{171}	—	September 29, 2011	Piszkéstető	K. Sárneczky	V	860 m	MPC; JPL
553685	2011 UE_{181}	—	September 8, 1996	Kitt Peak	Spacewatch	NYS	900 m	MPC; JPL
553686	2011 UU_{189}	—	October 26, 2011	Haleakala	Pan-STARRS 1	·	1.1 km	MPC; JPL
553687	2011 UO_{191}	—	September 1, 2005	Palomar	NEAT	·	3.3 km	MPC; JPL
553688	2011 UB_{193}	—	August 4, 2005	Palomar	NEAT	·	3.3 km	MPC; JPL
553689	2011 UH_{195}	—	September 12, 2007	Anderson Mesa	LONEOS	PHO	840 m	MPC; JPL
553690	2011 UE_{204}	—	November 5, 2007	Kitt Peak	Spacewatch	·	710 m	MPC; JPL
553691	2011 UC_{205}	—	September 23, 2011	Kitt Peak	Spacewatch	·	820 m	MPC; JPL
553692	2011 UX_{207}	—	June 24, 2007	Kitt Peak	Spacewatch	·	750 m	MPC; JPL
553693	2011 UY_{210}	—	January 25, 2009	Kitt Peak	Spacewatch	·	1.9 km	MPC; JPL
553694	2011 UW_{213}	—	October 24, 2011	Mount Lemmon	Mount Lemmon Survey	·	1.0 km	MPC; JPL
553695	2011 US_{217}	—	October 24, 2011	Mount Lemmon	Mount Lemmon Survey	·	2.5 km	MPC; JPL
553696	2011 UV_{219}	—	October 24, 2011	Mount Lemmon	Mount Lemmon Survey	MAS	540 m	MPC; JPL
553697	2011 UU_{234}	—	October 19, 2011	Kitt Peak	Spacewatch	·	1.1 km	MPC; JPL
553698	2011 UG_{241}	—	October 4, 2007	Catalina	CSS	NYS	1.0 km	MPC; JPL
553699	2011 UM_{241}	—	November 20, 2007	Kitt Peak	Spacewatch	·	990 m	MPC; JPL
553700	2011 UH_{243}	—	April 7, 2008	Mount Lemmon	Mount Lemmon Survey	·	2.3 km	MPC; JPL

== 553701–553800 ==
back to top

Designation			Discovery			Properties		Ref
Permanent	Provisional	Named after	Date	Site	Discoverer(s)	Category	Diam.	Ref
553701	2011 UG_{252}	—	November 3, 2007	Mount Lemmon	Mount Lemmon Survey	·	1.1 km	MPC; JPL
553702	2011 UG_{260}	—	October 25, 2011	Haleakala	Pan-STARRS 1	·	1.1 km	MPC; JPL
553703	2011 UK_{264}	—	August 18, 2007	Altschwendt	W. Ries	V	660 m	MPC; JPL
553704	2011 UB_{274}	—	October 27, 2006	Mount Lemmon	Mount Lemmon Survey	·	2.0 km	MPC; JPL
553705	2011 UL_{277}	—	January 3, 2009	Mount Lemmon	Mount Lemmon Survey	V	690 m	MPC; JPL
553706	2011 UP_{288}	—	October 28, 2011	Mount Lemmon	Mount Lemmon Survey	·	960 m	MPC; JPL
553707	2011 UX_{288}	—	September 23, 2005	Kitt Peak	Spacewatch	·	2.9 km	MPC; JPL
553708	2011 UT_{289}	—	September 25, 2011	Haleakala	Pan-STARRS 1	·	780 m	MPC; JPL
553709	2011 UL_{290}	—	January 31, 2009	Kitt Peak	Spacewatch	·	770 m	MPC; JPL
553710	2011 UE_{293}	—	October 8, 2007	Mount Lemmon	Mount Lemmon Survey	·	1.0 km	MPC; JPL
553711	2011 UJ_{295}	—	September 8, 2011	Kitt Peak	Spacewatch	·	1.1 km	MPC; JPL
553712	2011 UR_{301}	—	October 30, 2011	Kitt Peak	Spacewatch	·	590 m	MPC; JPL
553713	2011 UC_{307}	—	December 15, 2001	Apache Point	SDSS Collaboration	·	3.0 km	MPC; JPL
553714	2011 UH_{308}	—	August 23, 2007	Kitt Peak	Spacewatch	·	1.0 km	MPC; JPL
553715	2011 UK_{308}	—	September 10, 2007	Kitt Peak	Spacewatch	V	610 m	MPC; JPL
553716	2011 UP_{311}	—	October 30, 2011	Kitt Peak	Spacewatch	MAS	570 m	MPC; JPL
553717	2011 UM_{317}	—	August 28, 2003	Palomar	NEAT	MAS	860 m	MPC; JPL
553718	2011 UR_{318}	—	October 4, 2007	Mount Lemmon	Mount Lemmon Survey	MAS	600 m	MPC; JPL
553719	2011 UV_{321}	—	October 26, 2011	Haleakala	Pan-STARRS 1	·	3.4 km	MPC; JPL
553720	2011 UM_{322}	—	January 31, 2005	Palomar	NEAT	·	1.6 km	MPC; JPL
553721	2011 UQ_{324}	—	April 14, 2010	Mount Lemmon	Mount Lemmon Survey	H	380 m	MPC; JPL
553722	2011 UL_{328}	—	July 1, 2005	Kitt Peak	Spacewatch	·	2.3 km	MPC; JPL
553723	2011 UY_{329}	—	October 23, 2011	Mount Lemmon	Mount Lemmon Survey	·	1.2 km	MPC; JPL
553724	2011 UV_{334}	—	July 1, 2011	Mount Lemmon	Mount Lemmon Survey	·	850 m	MPC; JPL
553725	2011 UW_{334}	—	September 23, 2011	Haleakala	Pan-STARRS 1	EUN	880 m	MPC; JPL
553726	2011 UW_{336}	—	September 25, 2011	Haleakala	Pan-STARRS 1	·	850 m	MPC; JPL
553727	2011 UP_{345}	—	November 9, 2007	Kitt Peak	Spacewatch	·	660 m	MPC; JPL
553728	2011 UQ_{347}	—	September 4, 2011	Andrushivka	Y. Ivaščenko, Kyrylenko, P.	·	970 m	MPC; JPL
553729	2011 UW_{351}	—	December 19, 2004	Mount Lemmon	Mount Lemmon Survey	·	1.0 km	MPC; JPL
553730	2011 UW_{352}	—	November 21, 2001	Apache Point	SDSS Collaboration	·	1.3 km	MPC; JPL
553731	2011 UM_{354}	—	September 24, 2011	Kitt Peak	Spacewatch	·	840 m	MPC; JPL
553732	2011 UE_{356}	—	October 20, 2011	Mount Lemmon	Mount Lemmon Survey	EUN	930 m	MPC; JPL
553733	2011 UE_{363}	—	September 21, 2011	Kitt Peak	Spacewatch	V	580 m	MPC; JPL
553734	2011 UQ_{364}	—	October 22, 2011	Mount Lemmon	Mount Lemmon Survey	·	2.4 km	MPC; JPL
553735	2011 UL_{366}	—	October 22, 2011	Mount Lemmon	Mount Lemmon Survey	·	950 m	MPC; JPL
553736	2011 UA_{370}	—	September 5, 2007	Mount Lemmon	Mount Lemmon Survey	·	910 m	MPC; JPL
553737	2011 UE_{370}	—	September 14, 2007	Catalina	CSS	·	1.3 km	MPC; JPL
553738	2011 UJ_{370}	—	October 23, 2011	Mount Lemmon	Mount Lemmon Survey	·	2.5 km	MPC; JPL
553739	2011 UY_{371}	—	April 30, 2003	Kitt Peak	Spacewatch	·	1.0 km	MPC; JPL
553740	2011 UN_{384}	—	October 4, 2003	Kitt Peak	Spacewatch	·	1.2 km	MPC; JPL
553741	2011 UR_{388}	—	September 24, 2011	Haleakala	Pan-STARRS 1	·	3.2 km	MPC; JPL
553742	2011 UF_{393}	—	October 28, 2011	Mount Lemmon	Mount Lemmon Survey	THB	2.7 km	MPC; JPL
553743	2011 UC_{421}	—	June 29, 2014	Haleakala	Pan-STARRS 1	·	1.1 km	MPC; JPL
553744	2011 UC_{428}	—	October 18, 2011	Mount Lemmon	Mount Lemmon Survey	H	410 m	MPC; JPL
553745	2011 UN_{433}	—	October 20, 2011	Mount Lemmon	Mount Lemmon Survey	·	730 m	MPC; JPL
553746	2011 UL_{436}	—	May 28, 2014	Haleakala	Pan-STARRS 1	·	780 m	MPC; JPL
553747	2011 UC_{445}	—	October 26, 2011	Haleakala	Pan-STARRS 1	·	680 m	MPC; JPL
553748	2011 UH_{449}	—	October 25, 2011	Haleakala	Pan-STARRS 1	·	640 m	MPC; JPL
553749	2011 UF_{458}	—	October 23, 2011	Haleakala	Pan-STARRS 1	VER	2.2 km	MPC; JPL
553750	2011 UX_{464}	—	October 23, 2011	Mount Lemmon	Mount Lemmon Survey	·	1.5 km	MPC; JPL
553751	2011 UG_{465}	—	October 27, 2011	Mount Lemmon	Mount Lemmon Survey	·	1.5 km	MPC; JPL
553752	2011 UU_{466}	—	October 24, 2011	Haleakala	Pan-STARRS 1	(1547)	1.6 km	MPC; JPL
553753	2011 UR_{468}	—	October 26, 2011	Haleakala	Pan-STARRS 1	·	1.2 km	MPC; JPL
553754	2011 VK	—	December 12, 2006	Kitt Peak	Spacewatch	·	3.2 km	MPC; JPL
553755	2011 VW_{1}	—	July 20, 2007	Lulin	LUSS	·	1.2 km	MPC; JPL
553756	2011 VV_{3}	—	October 1, 2011	Kitt Peak	Spacewatch	·	780 m	MPC; JPL
553757	2011 VD_{8}	—	July 31, 2005	Palomar	NEAT	·	3.1 km	MPC; JPL
553758	2011 VP_{17}	—	October 20, 2011	Mount Lemmon	Mount Lemmon Survey	·	1.2 km	MPC; JPL
553759	2011 VR_{18}	—	October 25, 2011	Haleakala	Pan-STARRS 1	·	1.4 km	MPC; JPL
553760	2011 VD_{19}	—	November 8, 2007	Kitt Peak	Spacewatch	BRG	1.1 km	MPC; JPL
553761	2011 VP_{21}	—	October 24, 2011	Haleakala	Pan-STARRS 1	H	450 m	MPC; JPL
553762	2011 VA_{22}	—	October 21, 2006	Kitt Peak	Spacewatch	·	1.4 km	MPC; JPL
553763	2011 VW_{24}	—	November 11, 2006	Kitt Peak	Spacewatch	·	2.9 km	MPC; JPL
553764	2011 VF_{25}	—	December 22, 2012	Haleakala	Pan-STARRS 1	·	2.6 km	MPC; JPL
553765	2011 WJ	—	September 28, 2011	Mount Lemmon	Mount Lemmon Survey	·	1.9 km	MPC; JPL
553766	2011 WW_{12}	—	November 16, 2011	Mount Lemmon	Mount Lemmon Survey	·	1.1 km	MPC; JPL
553767	2011 WS_{16}	—	January 17, 2004	Kitt Peak	Spacewatch	EUN	1.3 km	MPC; JPL
553768	2011 WV_{28}	—	September 24, 2011	Mount Lemmon	Mount Lemmon Survey	NYS	960 m	MPC; JPL
553769	2011 WJ_{30}	—	October 24, 2011	Haleakala	Pan-STARRS 1	·	2.7 km	MPC; JPL
553770	2011 WM_{30}	—	November 2, 2011	Mount Lemmon	Mount Lemmon Survey	·	1.1 km	MPC; JPL
553771	2011 WO_{36}	—	November 23, 2011	Mount Lemmon	Mount Lemmon Survey	EOS	1.7 km	MPC; JPL
553772	2011 WF_{49}	—	October 31, 2011	Kitt Peak	Spacewatch	·	890 m	MPC; JPL
553773	2011 WW_{52}	—	November 23, 2011	XuYi	PMO NEO Survey Program	H	620 m	MPC; JPL
553774	2011 WM_{54}	—	February 2, 2009	Kitt Peak	Spacewatch	MAS	720 m	MPC; JPL
553775	2011 WF_{55}	—	August 30, 2005	Kitt Peak	Spacewatch	·	2.5 km	MPC; JPL
553776	2011 WY_{57}	—	October 21, 2011	Mount Lemmon	Mount Lemmon Survey	·	850 m	MPC; JPL
553777	2011 WX_{60}	—	December 28, 1995	Kitt Peak	Spacewatch	·	720 m	MPC; JPL
553778	2011 WW_{62}	—	November 23, 2011	Les Engarouines	L. Bernasconi	·	900 m	MPC; JPL
553779	2011 WH_{64}	—	November 24, 2011	Mount Lemmon	Mount Lemmon Survey	·	2.2 km	MPC; JPL
553780	2011 WV_{73}	—	October 24, 2011	Haleakala	Pan-STARRS 1	V	620 m	MPC; JPL
553781	2011 WJ_{84}	—	December 4, 2007	Mount Lemmon	Mount Lemmon Survey	·	1.2 km	MPC; JPL
553782	2011 WA_{89}	—	September 30, 2002	Haleakala	NEAT	·	2.3 km	MPC; JPL
553783	2011 WN_{92}	—	September 10, 2007	Kitt Peak	Spacewatch	CLA	1.4 km	MPC; JPL
553784	2011 WX_{101}	—	October 26, 2011	Haleakala	Pan-STARRS 1	PHO	920 m	MPC; JPL
553785	2011 WY_{101}	—	November 27, 2011	Kitt Peak	Spacewatch	V	770 m	MPC; JPL
553786	2011 WC_{105}	—	October 26, 2011	Haleakala	Pan-STARRS 1	·	1.3 km	MPC; JPL
553787	2011 WK_{107}	—	October 4, 2007	Catalina	CSS	·	1.1 km	MPC; JPL
553788	2011 WK_{116}	—	October 25, 2011	Haleakala	Pan-STARRS 1	EUN	1.1 km	MPC; JPL
553789	2011 WR_{116}	—	February 6, 2002	Palomar	NEAT	·	620 m	MPC; JPL
553790	2011 WO_{120}	—	October 30, 2011	Catalina	CSS	·	1.5 km	MPC; JPL
553791	2011 WE_{121}	—	October 26, 2011	Haleakala	Pan-STARRS 1	(5)	900 m	MPC; JPL
553792	2011 WS_{122}	—	October 18, 2011	Mount Lemmon	Mount Lemmon Survey	·	3.5 km	MPC; JPL
553793	2011 WQ_{128}	—	October 31, 2011	Kitt Peak	Spacewatch	·	1.1 km	MPC; JPL
553794	2011 WB_{130}	—	September 28, 2006	Kitt Peak	Spacewatch	·	1.5 km	MPC; JPL
553795	2011 WN_{130}	—	October 23, 2011	Kitt Peak	Spacewatch	·	1.1 km	MPC; JPL
553796	2011 WF_{131}	—	November 27, 2011	Kitt Peak	Spacewatch	·	1.0 km	MPC; JPL
553797	2011 WE_{135}	—	November 25, 2011	Haleakala	Pan-STARRS 1	·	920 m	MPC; JPL
553798	2011 WZ_{138}	—	November 17, 2011	Mount Lemmon	Mount Lemmon Survey	·	2.8 km	MPC; JPL
553799	2011 WC_{143}	—	October 16, 2007	Mount Lemmon	Mount Lemmon Survey	·	980 m	MPC; JPL
553800	2011 WS_{150}	—	November 11, 2007	Catalina	CSS	·	1.4 km	MPC; JPL

== 553801–553900 ==
back to top

Designation			Discovery			Properties		Ref
Permanent	Provisional	Named after	Date	Site	Discoverer(s)	Category	Diam.	Ref
553801	2011 WZ_{157}	—	November 18, 2011	Mount Lemmon	Mount Lemmon Survey	·	1.1 km	MPC; JPL
553802	2011 WN_{160}	—	July 4, 2016	Haleakala	Pan-STARRS 1	·	2.7 km	MPC; JPL
553803	2011 WX_{160}	—	November 27, 2011	Kitt Peak	Spacewatch	·	2.0 km	MPC; JPL
553804	2011 WH_{161}	—	November 24, 2011	Mount Lemmon	Mount Lemmon Survey	·	1.2 km	MPC; JPL
553805	2011 WV_{162}	—	November 30, 2011	Mount Lemmon	Mount Lemmon Survey	·	1.0 km	MPC; JPL
553806	2011 WU_{163}	—	November 28, 2011	Kitt Peak	Spacewatch	EOS	1.5 km	MPC; JPL
553807	2011 WB_{165}	—	November 24, 2011	Haleakala	Pan-STARRS 1	·	1.2 km	MPC; JPL
553808	2011 WC_{167}	—	October 20, 2016	Mount Lemmon	Mount Lemmon Survey	·	2.4 km	MPC; JPL
553809	2011 WF_{167}	—	May 24, 2014	Haleakala	Pan-STARRS 1	·	1.2 km	MPC; JPL
553810	2011 WG_{167}	—	November 30, 2011	Kitt Peak	Spacewatch	·	1.1 km	MPC; JPL
553811	2011 WW_{171}	—	November 28, 2011	Mount Lemmon	Mount Lemmon Survey	H	440 m	MPC; JPL
553812	2011 WX_{172}	—	November 24, 2011	Haleakala	Pan-STARRS 1	EUN	960 m	MPC; JPL
553813	2011 WT_{175}	—	November 26, 2011	Mount Lemmon	Mount Lemmon Survey	L4	9.4 km	MPC; JPL
553814	2011 WF_{177}	—	November 23, 2011	Mount Lemmon	Mount Lemmon Survey	·	880 m	MPC; JPL
553815	2011 WB_{178}	—	November 22, 2011	Mount Lemmon	Mount Lemmon Survey	·	1.4 km	MPC; JPL
553816	2011 WG_{179}	—	November 25, 2011	Haleakala	Pan-STARRS 1	JUN	820 m	MPC; JPL
553817	2011 XA	—	December 1, 2011	Mount Lemmon	Mount Lemmon Survey	·	1.3 km	MPC; JPL
553818	2011 XW_{4}	—	September 16, 2014	Haleakala	Pan-STARRS 1	MAR	1.1 km	MPC; JPL
553819	2011 YW_{3}	—	December 21, 2011	Oukaïmeden	C. Rinner	JUN	880 m	MPC; JPL
553820	2011 YP_{6}	—	January 10, 2007	Kitt Peak	Spacewatch	EOS	1.9 km	MPC; JPL
553821	2011 YF_{8}	—	November 8, 2007	Kitt Peak	Spacewatch	·	1.2 km	MPC; JPL
553822	2011 YH_{9}	—	November 24, 2011	Mount Lemmon	Mount Lemmon Survey	·	810 m	MPC; JPL
553823	2011 YZ_{22}	—	December 25, 2011	Kitt Peak	Spacewatch	(1547)	1.4 km	MPC; JPL
553824	2011 YM_{27}	—	November 3, 2007	Mount Lemmon	Mount Lemmon Survey	·	1.1 km	MPC; JPL
553825	2011 YY_{37}	—	September 16, 2006	Catalina	CSS	·	1.2 km	MPC; JPL
553826	2011 YE_{41}	—	November 20, 2003	Kitt Peak	Deep Ecliptic Survey	·	960 m	MPC; JPL
553827	2011 YH_{41}	—	November 2, 2007	Mount Lemmon	Mount Lemmon Survey	·	960 m	MPC; JPL
553828	2011 YF_{43}	—	June 18, 2005	Mount Lemmon	Mount Lemmon Survey	H	460 m	MPC; JPL
553829	2011 YN_{54}	—	December 29, 2011	Kitt Peak	Spacewatch	PHO	1.0 km	MPC; JPL
553830	2011 YY_{56}	—	January 15, 2008	Mount Lemmon	Mount Lemmon Survey	·	800 m	MPC; JPL
553831	2011 YH_{62}	—	July 19, 2006	Mauna Kea	P. A. Wiegert, D. Subasinghe	·	1.3 km	MPC; JPL
553832	2011 YK_{64}	—	December 14, 2007	Mount Lemmon	Mount Lemmon Survey	·	1.5 km	MPC; JPL
553833	2011 YY_{68}	—	December 24, 2011	Mount Lemmon	Mount Lemmon Survey	·	980 m	MPC; JPL
553834	2011 YL_{69}	—	December 27, 2011	Mount Lemmon	Mount Lemmon Survey	·	1.3 km	MPC; JPL
553835	2011 YU_{69}	—	November 3, 2007	Mount Lemmon	Mount Lemmon Survey	·	830 m	MPC; JPL
553836	2011 YA_{74}	—	November 24, 2011	Haleakala	Pan-STARRS 1	·	1.1 km	MPC; JPL
553837	2011 YH_{80}	—	December 29, 2011	Mount Lemmon	Mount Lemmon Survey	·	1.2 km	MPC; JPL
553838	2011 YJ_{80}	—	December 29, 2011	Mount Lemmon	Mount Lemmon Survey	·	990 m	MPC; JPL
553839	2011 YC_{82}	—	December 30, 2011	Kitt Peak	Spacewatch	T_{j} (2.97) · 3:2	5.2 km	MPC; JPL
553840	2011 YW_{83}	—	December 29, 2011	Mount Lemmon	Mount Lemmon Survey	·	1.1 km	MPC; JPL
553841	2011 YO_{87}	—	December 4, 2015	Mount Lemmon	Mount Lemmon Survey	(5)	960 m	MPC; JPL
553842	2011 YV_{87}	—	December 31, 2011	Kitt Peak	Spacewatch	·	1.1 km	MPC; JPL
553843	2011 YO_{89}	—	January 8, 2016	Haleakala	Pan-STARRS 1	·	1.0 km	MPC; JPL
553844	2012 AU_{2}	—	January 2, 2012	Kitt Peak	Spacewatch	(5)	950 m	MPC; JPL
553845	2012 AZ_{11}	—	January 1, 2012	Mount Lemmon	Mount Lemmon Survey	·	1.5 km	MPC; JPL
553846	2012 AO_{13}	—	January 16, 2008	Kitt Peak	Spacewatch	·	1.1 km	MPC; JPL
553847	2012 AS_{13}	—	January 14, 2012	Kitt Peak	Spacewatch	·	990 m	MPC; JPL
553848	2012 AY_{13}	—	August 27, 2005	Palomar	NEAT	GEF	1.3 km	MPC; JPL
553849	2012 AR_{17}	—	December 30, 2011	Kitt Peak	Spacewatch	·	1.4 km	MPC; JPL
553850	2012 AG_{20}	—	January 20, 2008	Kitt Peak	Spacewatch	·	880 m	MPC; JPL
553851	2012 AJ_{23}	—	February 7, 2002	Kitt Peak	Spacewatch	EOS	2.0 km	MPC; JPL
553852	2012 AN_{24}	—	January 1, 2012	Mount Lemmon	Mount Lemmon Survey	NYS	1.2 km	MPC; JPL
553853	2012 AL_{26}	—	March 31, 2008	Kitt Peak	Spacewatch	·	2.0 km	MPC; JPL
553854	2012 AD_{32}	—	January 1, 2012	Mount Lemmon	Mount Lemmon Survey	·	800 m	MPC; JPL
553855	2012 AF_{33}	—	January 3, 2012	Mount Lemmon	Mount Lemmon Survey	·	1.3 km	MPC; JPL
553856	2012 BA_{1}	—	January 17, 2012	Les Engarouines	L. Bernasconi	EUN	1.2 km	MPC; JPL
553857	2012 BY_{2}	—	January 18, 2012	Oukaïmeden	M. Ory	·	1.1 km	MPC; JPL
553858	2012 BJ_{15}	—	November 27, 2011	Mount Lemmon	Mount Lemmon Survey	·	1.1 km	MPC; JPL
553859	2012 BJ_{18}	—	January 19, 2012	Haleakala	Pan-STARRS 1	·	1.2 km	MPC; JPL
553860	2012 BE_{30}	—	February 11, 2008	Mount Lemmon	Mount Lemmon Survey	(5)	960 m	MPC; JPL
553861	2012 BN_{31}	—	January 20, 2012	Kitt Peak	Spacewatch	·	1.5 km	MPC; JPL
553862	2012 BF_{34}	—	November 28, 2011	Mount Lemmon	Mount Lemmon Survey	·	1.4 km	MPC; JPL
553863	2012 BZ_{36}	—	January 10, 2008	Mount Lemmon	Mount Lemmon Survey	·	1.0 km	MPC; JPL
553864	2012 BA_{47}	—	January 11, 2008	Mount Lemmon	Mount Lemmon Survey	EUN	1.3 km	MPC; JPL
553865	2012 BB_{55}	—	December 14, 2006	Palomar	NEAT	·	2.5 km	MPC; JPL
553866	2012 BF_{66}	—	January 20, 2012	Mount Lemmon	Mount Lemmon Survey	·	1.1 km	MPC; JPL
553867	2012 BC_{73}	—	January 21, 2012	Haleakala	Pan-STARRS 1	·	1.4 km	MPC; JPL
553868	2012 BN_{74}	—	January 2, 2012	Kitt Peak	Spacewatch	MAR	930 m	MPC; JPL
553869	2012 BV_{84}	—	January 27, 2012	Mount Lemmon	Mount Lemmon Survey	·	1.4 km	MPC; JPL
553870	2012 BC_{89}	—	October 15, 2001	Palomar	NEAT	GEF	1.5 km	MPC; JPL
553871	2012 BN_{90}	—	November 28, 2011	Mount Lemmon	Mount Lemmon Survey	HNS	1.4 km	MPC; JPL
553872	2012 BV_{92}	—	January 26, 2012	Haleakala	Pan-STARRS 1	·	650 m	MPC; JPL
553873	2012 BJ_{95}	—	November 12, 2007	Mount Lemmon	Mount Lemmon Survey	·	1.2 km	MPC; JPL
553874	2012 BE_{96}	—	November 25, 2011	Haleakala	Pan-STARRS 1	·	990 m	MPC; JPL
553875	2012 BM_{96}	—	January 21, 2012	Catalina	CSS	·	350 m	MPC; JPL
553876	2012 BR_{96}	—	January 12, 2008	Mount Lemmon	Mount Lemmon Survey	·	1.2 km	MPC; JPL
553877	2012 BC_{99}	—	October 2, 2006	Mount Lemmon	Mount Lemmon Survey	(5)	920 m	MPC; JPL
553878	2012 BW_{103}	—	February 6, 2008	Kitt Peak	Spacewatch	·	1.1 km	MPC; JPL
553879	2012 BY_{106}	—	January 2, 2012	Mount Lemmon	Mount Lemmon Survey	·	1.6 km	MPC; JPL
553880	2012 BH_{115}	—	March 5, 2008	Mount Lemmon	Mount Lemmon Survey	·	1.4 km	MPC; JPL
553881	2012 BK_{121}	—	January 21, 2012	Kitt Peak	Spacewatch	EUN	1.0 km	MPC; JPL
553882	2012 BO_{131}	—	October 23, 2006	Kitt Peak	Spacewatch	·	1.7 km	MPC; JPL
553883	2012 BZ_{141}	—	December 18, 2007	Mount Lemmon	Mount Lemmon Survey	EUN	1.1 km	MPC; JPL
553884	2012 BC_{142}	—	January 29, 2012	Haleakala	Pan-STARRS 1	HNS	1.5 km	MPC; JPL
553885	2012 BY_{142}	—	December 27, 2011	Mount Lemmon	Mount Lemmon Survey	EUN	840 m	MPC; JPL
553886	2012 BE_{143}	—	January 24, 2012	Haleakala	Pan-STARRS 1	EUN	1.2 km	MPC; JPL
553887	2012 BH_{145}	—	February 7, 2008	Kitt Peak	Spacewatch	·	1.1 km	MPC; JPL
553888	2012 BC_{146}	—	January 27, 2012	Mount Lemmon	Mount Lemmon Survey	·	1.4 km	MPC; JPL
553889	2012 BJ_{147}	—	February 28, 2008	Mount Lemmon	Mount Lemmon Survey	·	1.0 km	MPC; JPL
553890	2012 BL_{147}	—	January 27, 2012	Mount Lemmon	Mount Lemmon Survey	·	890 m	MPC; JPL
553891	2012 BS_{150}	—	December 27, 2011	Mount Lemmon	Mount Lemmon Survey	H	500 m	MPC; JPL
553892	2012 BW_{151}	—	October 31, 2010	ESA OGS	ESA OGS	·	3.0 km	MPC; JPL
553893	2012 BW_{154}	—	January 20, 2012	Haleakala	Pan-STARRS 1	cubewano (hot)	365 km	MPC; JPL
553894	2012 BU_{156}	—	January 18, 2012	Kitt Peak	Spacewatch	(5)	1.1 km	MPC; JPL
553895	2012 BA_{157}	—	January 26, 2012	Mount Lemmon	Mount Lemmon Survey	MAR	850 m	MPC; JPL
553896	2012 BF_{158}	—	April 9, 2008	Kitt Peak	Spacewatch	·	1.3 km	MPC; JPL
553897	2012 BT_{158}	—	January 24, 2012	Haleakala	Pan-STARRS 1	·	1.0 km	MPC; JPL
553898	2012 BZ_{159}	—	January 19, 2012	Haleakala	Pan-STARRS 1	cubewano (hot)	221 km	MPC; JPL
553899	2012 BB_{161}	—	November 1, 2014	Mount Lemmon	Mount Lemmon Survey	·	570 m	MPC; JPL
553900	2012 BC_{161}	—	March 11, 2007	Kitt Peak	Spacewatch	·	2.5 km	MPC; JPL

== 553901–554000 ==
back to top

Designation			Discovery			Properties		Ref
Permanent	Provisional	Named after	Date	Site	Discoverer(s)	Category	Diam.	Ref
553901	2012 BP_{161}	—	March 14, 2015	Haleakala	Pan-STARRS 1	·	1.0 km	MPC; JPL
553902	2012 BR_{162}	—	January 30, 2012	Mount Lemmon	Mount Lemmon Survey	MAR	850 m	MPC; JPL
553903	2012 BH_{164}	—	January 31, 2012	Charleston	R. Holmes	·	860 m	MPC; JPL
553904	2012 BS_{164}	—	June 21, 2014	Haleakala	Pan-STARRS 1	·	2.7 km	MPC; JPL
553905	2012 BF_{172}	—	January 18, 2012	Catalina	CSS	·	1.5 km	MPC; JPL
553906	2012 BR_{172}	—	January 20, 2012	Kitt Peak	Spacewatch	·	1.4 km	MPC; JPL
553907	2012 BO_{174}	—	January 30, 2012	Kitt Peak	Spacewatch	3:2	4.0 km	MPC; JPL
553908	2012 BT_{174}	—	November 24, 2006	Mount Lemmon	Mount Lemmon Survey	MAR	900 m	MPC; JPL
553909	2012 BW_{174}	—	January 26, 2012	Haleakala	Pan-STARRS 1	·	850 m	MPC; JPL
553910	2012 BH_{180}	—	January 30, 2012	Mount Lemmon	Mount Lemmon Survey	·	1.1 km	MPC; JPL
553911	2012 CH_{1}	—	February 1, 2012	Kitt Peak	Spacewatch	·	2.0 km	MPC; JPL
553912	2012 CG_{2}	—	September 28, 2006	Kitt Peak	Spacewatch	·	1.6 km	MPC; JPL
553913	2012 CO_{6}	—	January 19, 2012	Kitt Peak	Spacewatch	3:2	5.7 km	MPC; JPL
553914	2012 CZ_{9}	—	March 26, 2004	Kitt Peak	Deep Lens Survey	·	1.1 km	MPC; JPL
553915	2012 CR_{10}	—	October 18, 2001	Palomar	NEAT	·	1.7 km	MPC; JPL
553916	2012 CF_{14}	—	February 3, 2012	Haleakala	Pan-STARRS 1	3:2	4.0 km	MPC; JPL
553917	2012 CQ_{15}	—	February 8, 2008	Kitt Peak	Spacewatch	(5)	1.1 km	MPC; JPL
553918	2012 CT_{16}	—	March 31, 2003	Kitt Peak	Spacewatch	·	2.0 km	MPC; JPL
553919	2012 CC_{20}	—	February 12, 2012	Mount Lemmon	Mount Lemmon Survey	·	1.0 km	MPC; JPL
553920	2012 CJ_{26}	—	January 21, 2012	Kitt Peak	Spacewatch	ADE	1.6 km	MPC; JPL
553921	2012 CN_{26}	—	February 11, 2012	Mount Lemmon	Mount Lemmon Survey	·	1.3 km	MPC; JPL
553922	2012 CU_{26}	—	January 30, 2012	Kitt Peak	Spacewatch	HNS	980 m	MPC; JPL
553923	2012 CL_{28}	—	September 14, 2006	Catalina	CSS	·	1.2 km	MPC; JPL
553924	2012 CQ_{35}	—	June 30, 2001	Palomar	NEAT	·	1.8 km	MPC; JPL
553925	2012 CS_{35}	—	September 11, 2010	Mount Lemmon	Mount Lemmon Survey	(5)	1.1 km	MPC; JPL
553926	2012 CL_{39}	—	February 3, 2012	Kitt Peak	Spacewatch	EUN	970 m	MPC; JPL
553927	2012 CB_{45}	—	April 6, 2008	Goodricke-Pigott	R. A. Tucker	·	1.4 km	MPC; JPL
553928	2012 CZ_{48}	—	January 29, 2012	Mount Lemmon	Mount Lemmon Survey	·	750 m	MPC; JPL
553929	2012 CT_{55}	—	February 9, 2008	Kitt Peak	Spacewatch	·	610 m	MPC; JPL
553930	2012 CV_{59}	—	February 4, 2012	Haleakala	Pan-STARRS 1	·	1.1 km	MPC; JPL
553931	2012 CX_{59}	—	May 16, 2013	Haleakala	Pan-STARRS 1	·	1.3 km	MPC; JPL
553932	2012 CX_{62}	—	September 25, 2005	Catalina	CSS	·	2.2 km	MPC; JPL
553933	2012 CG_{65}	—	July 8, 2014	Haleakala	Pan-STARRS 1	·	1.0 km	MPC; JPL
553934	2012 CV_{65}	—	February 15, 2012	Haleakala	Pan-STARRS 1	MAR	780 m	MPC; JPL
553935	2012 CQ_{67}	—	February 15, 2012	Haleakala	Pan-STARRS 1	·	2.5 km	MPC; JPL
553936	2012 DW_{11}	—	February 19, 2012	Kitt Peak	Spacewatch	·	710 m	MPC; JPL
553937	2012 DQ_{12}	—	January 31, 2012	Mount Lemmon	Mount Lemmon Survey	·	1.1 km	MPC; JPL
553938	2012 DZ_{18}	—	January 19, 2012	Haleakala	Pan-STARRS 1	EUN	1.1 km	MPC; JPL
553939	2012 DB_{38}	—	November 18, 2006	Kitt Peak	Spacewatch	·	1.4 km	MPC; JPL
553940	2012 DN_{41}	—	March 8, 2008	Mount Lemmon	Mount Lemmon Survey	·	960 m	MPC; JPL
553941	2012 DW_{46}	—	January 19, 2012	Haleakala	Pan-STARRS 1	EUN	1.1 km	MPC; JPL
553942	2012 DO_{49}	—	March 31, 2008	Mount Lemmon	Mount Lemmon Survey	·	830 m	MPC; JPL
553943	2012 DQ_{53}	—	August 26, 2000	Cerro Tololo	Deep Ecliptic Survey	·	1.7 km	MPC; JPL
553944	2012 DC_{79}	—	February 22, 2012	Catalina	CSS	·	2.1 km	MPC; JPL
553945	2012 DH_{90}	—	October 2, 2006	Kitt Peak	Spacewatch	NYS	1.1 km	MPC; JPL
553946	2012 DY_{92}	—	February 16, 2012	Haleakala	Pan-STARRS 1	3:2	4.2 km	MPC; JPL
553947	2012 DZ_{93}	—	February 15, 2012	Haleakala	Pan-STARRS 1	·	920 m	MPC; JPL
553948	2012 DT_{100}	—	November 14, 2010	Mount Lemmon	Mount Lemmon Survey	·	1.5 km	MPC; JPL
553949	2012 DP_{101}	—	September 4, 2000	Kitt Peak	Spacewatch	·	1.3 km	MPC; JPL
553950	2012 DE_{102}	—	January 29, 2003	Apache Point	SDSS	·	1.9 km	MPC; JPL
553951	2012 DL_{104}	—	December 21, 2006	Kitt Peak	L. H. Wasserman, M. W. Buie	WIT	970 m	MPC; JPL
553952	2012 DQ_{104}	—	February 27, 2012	Haleakala	Pan-STARRS 1	EUN	670 m	MPC; JPL
553953	2012 DT_{105}	—	December 13, 2010	Mount Lemmon	Mount Lemmon Survey	·	1.2 km	MPC; JPL
553954	2012 DF_{106}	—	October 10, 2010	Mount Lemmon	Mount Lemmon Survey	·	1.0 km	MPC; JPL
553955	2012 DU_{106}	—	February 27, 2012	Catalina	CSS	·	2.6 km	MPC; JPL
553956	2012 DL_{107}	—	July 7, 2014	Haleakala	Pan-STARRS 1	EUN	840 m	MPC; JPL
553957	2012 DM_{107}	—	February 27, 2012	Haleakala	Pan-STARRS 1	·	1.8 km	MPC; JPL
553958	2012 DD_{109}	—	February 23, 2012	Mount Lemmon	Mount Lemmon Survey	·	1.1 km	MPC; JPL
553959	2012 DC_{112}	—	December 1, 2014	Haleakala	Pan-STARRS 1	·	1.1 km	MPC; JPL
553960	2012 DD_{117}	—	February 26, 2012	Haleakala	Pan-STARRS 1	3:2 · SHU	4.6 km	MPC; JPL
553961	2012 DO_{119}	—	February 28, 2012	Haleakala	Pan-STARRS 1	·	1.2 km	MPC; JPL
553962	2012 DQ_{122}	—	February 27, 2012	Haleakala	Pan-STARRS 1	·	2.1 km	MPC; JPL
553963	2012 EX_{4}	—	December 6, 2011	Haleakala	Pan-STARRS 1	EUN	1.2 km	MPC; JPL
553964	2012 EM_{10}	—	August 27, 2006	Lulin	LUSS	·	1.9 km	MPC; JPL
553965	2012 EQ_{11}	—	August 30, 2005	Kitt Peak	Spacewatch	MAR	880 m	MPC; JPL
553966	2012 EP_{22}	—	November 2, 2010	Kitt Peak	Spacewatch	·	1.2 km	MPC; JPL
553967	2012 EK_{25}	—	September 12, 2005	Kitt Peak	Spacewatch	·	1.1 km	MPC; JPL
553968	2012 FP_{2}	—	November 13, 2010	Kitt Peak	Spacewatch	3:2	4.5 km	MPC; JPL
553969	2012 FW_{5}	—	February 23, 2012	Mount Lemmon	Mount Lemmon Survey	DOR	1.7 km	MPC; JPL
553970	2012 FL_{6}	—	March 9, 2005	Mount Lemmon	Mount Lemmon Survey	·	700 m	MPC; JPL
553971	2012 FA_{7}	—	January 19, 2012	Haleakala	Pan-STARRS 1	·	900 m	MPC; JPL
553972	2012 FD_{13}	—	March 17, 2012	Mount Lemmon	Mount Lemmon Survey	·	960 m	MPC; JPL
553973	2012 FM_{13}	—	October 10, 2010	Mount Lemmon	Mount Lemmon Survey	EUN	1.2 km	MPC; JPL
553974	2012 FF_{15}	—	March 21, 2012	Wildberg	R. Apitzsch	·	830 m	MPC; JPL
553975	2012 FQ_{16}	—	October 28, 2010	Mount Lemmon	Mount Lemmon Survey	·	1.1 km	MPC; JPL
553976	2012 FR_{16}	—	September 18, 2009	Kitt Peak	Spacewatch	·	2.3 km	MPC; JPL
553977	2012 FL_{19}	—	July 30, 2005	Palomar	NEAT	·	1.2 km	MPC; JPL
553978	2012 FN_{19}	—	March 13, 2012	Mount Lemmon	Mount Lemmon Survey	·	1.1 km	MPC; JPL
553979	2012 FX_{22}	—	March 21, 2012	Kachina	Hobart, J.	·	1.6 km	MPC; JPL
553980	2012 FM_{29}	—	September 4, 2008	Kitt Peak	Spacewatch	3:2	4.7 km	MPC; JPL
553981	2012 FB_{38}	—	November 15, 2010	Mount Lemmon	Mount Lemmon Survey	VER	2.7 km	MPC; JPL
553982	2012 FV_{38}	—	February 24, 2012	Haleakala	Pan-STARRS 1	·	1.2 km	MPC; JPL
553983	2012 FW_{39}	—	February 3, 2012	Mount Lemmon	Mount Lemmon Survey	·	1.7 km	MPC; JPL
553984	2012 FD_{46}	—	September 17, 2010	Kitt Peak	Spacewatch	(5)	860 m	MPC; JPL
553985	2012 FX_{49}	—	September 30, 2010	Mount Lemmon	Mount Lemmon Survey	·	1.2 km	MPC; JPL
553986	2012 FE_{50}	—	October 14, 2001	Apache Point	SDSS Collaboration	·	1.5 km	MPC; JPL
553987	2012 FS_{50}	—	March 30, 2008	Kitt Peak	Spacewatch	·	1.2 km	MPC; JPL
553988	2012 FY_{51}	—	February 28, 2008	Kitt Peak	Spacewatch	(5)	1.9 km	MPC; JPL
553989	2012 FK_{57}	—	March 26, 2012	Charleston	R. Holmes	·	1.4 km	MPC; JPL
553990	2012 FH_{60}	—	March 27, 2012	Catalina	CSS	·	2.0 km	MPC; JPL
553991	2012 FC_{61}	—	February 22, 2003	Palomar	NEAT	·	2.0 km	MPC; JPL
553992	2012 FY_{65}	—	March 27, 2008	Kitt Peak	Spacewatch	·	1.4 km	MPC; JPL
553993	2012 FL_{69}	—	March 11, 2003	Palomar	NEAT	·	1.8 km	MPC; JPL
553994	2012 FK_{71}	—	February 1, 2003	Palomar	NEAT	·	1.8 km	MPC; JPL
553995	2012 FO_{71}	—	March 28, 2012	Haleakala	Pan-STARRS 1	·	1.5 km	MPC; JPL
553996	2012 FL_{72}	—	January 31, 2003	Palomar	NEAT	·	2.1 km	MPC; JPL
553997	2012 FB_{74}	—	October 11, 2001	Palomar	NEAT	EUN	1.2 km	MPC; JPL
553998	2012 FC_{78}	—	May 1, 2008	Catalina	CSS	·	1.7 km	MPC; JPL
553999	2012 FU_{78}	—	March 27, 2012	Mayhill-ISON	L. Elenin	·	1.3 km	MPC; JPL
554000	2012 FM_{87}	—	March 16, 2012	Haleakala	Pan-STARRS 1	SDO	213 km	MPC; JPL

back to top

== Meaning of names ==
As minor planet discoveries are confirmed, they are given a permanent number by the IAU's Minor Planet Center (MPC), and the discoverers can then submit names for them, following the IAU's naming conventions. The list below concerns those minor planets in the specified number-range that have received names, and explains the meanings of those names.

Official naming citations of newly named small Solar System bodies are approved and published in a bulletin by IAU's Working Group for Small Bodies Nomenclature (WGSBN). Before May 2021, citations were published in MPC's Minor Planet Circulars for many decades. Recent citations can also be found on the JPL Small-Body Database (SBDB). Until his death in 2016, German astronomer Lutz D. Schmadel compiled these citations into the Dictionary of Minor Planet Names (DMP) and regularly updated the collection.

Based on Paul Herget's The Names of the Minor Planets, Schmadel also researched the unclear origin of numerous asteroids, most of which had been named prior to World War II. This article incorporates text from this source, which is in the public domain: SBDB New namings may only be added to this list below after official publication as the preannouncement of names is condemned. The WGSBN publishes a comprehensive guideline for the naming rules of non-cometary small Solar System bodies.

Named minor planet	Provisional	This minor planet was named for...	Ref; Catalog
553035 Faikmusayev	2011 AM_{34}	Faik Musayev (1959–2021), Russian astrophysicist and design engineer.	IAU · 553035
553076 Maturkanič	2011 BQ_{44}	Michal Maturkanič, Slovakian astronomer.	IAU · 553076
553438 Bércziszaniszló	2011 QA_{7}	Szaniszló Bérczi (b. 1950), a Hungarian planetary scientist and professor of Space and Planetary Sciences at Eötvös Loránd University	IAU · 553438
553532 Alfiejohnpercy	2011 SB_{71}	Alfie John Percy Forward (b. 2012), the grandson of the discoverer.	IAU · 553532
