= List of minor planets: 597001–598000 =

The following is a partial list of minor planets, running from minor-planet number 597001 through 598000, inclusive. The primary data for this and other partial lists is based on JPL's "Small-Body Orbital Elements" and data available from the Minor Planet Center. Critical list information is also provided by the MPC, unless otherwise specified from Lowell Observatory. A detailed description of the table's columns and additional sources are given on the main page including a complete list of every page in this series, and a statistical break-up on the dynamical classification of minor planets.

Also see the summary list of all named bodies in numerical and alphabetical order, and the corresponding naming citations for the number range of this particular list. New namings may only be added to this list after official publication, as the preannouncement of names is condemned by the Working Group for Small Bodies Nomenclature of the International Astronomical Union.

Near-Earth obj.	MBA (inner)	MBA (outer)	Centaur
Mars-crosser	MBA (middle)	Jupiter trojan	Trans-Neptunian obj.
Unclassified

== 597001–597100 ==
Designation			Discovery			Properties		Ref
Permanent	Provisional	Named after	Date	Site	Discoverer(s)	Category	Diam.	Ref
597001	2006 QY_{76}	—	August 21, 2006	Palomar	NEAT	·	960 m	MPC · JPL
597002	2006 QB_{78}	—	August 22, 2006	Palomar	NEAT	·	1.2 km	MPC · JPL
597003	2006 QQ_{78}	—	August 22, 2006	Palomar	NEAT	·	770 m	MPC · JPL
597004	2006 QA_{80}	—	August 24, 2006	Palomar	NEAT	·	1.6 km	MPC · JPL
597005	2006 QK_{85}	—	August 19, 2006	Kitt Peak	Spacewatch	MAS	560 m	MPC · JPL
597006	2006 QP_{89}	—	August 29, 2006	Wrightwood	J. W. Young	·	900 m	MPC · JPL
597007	2006 QM_{91}	—	August 21, 2006	Palomar	NEAT	(2076)	780 m	MPC · JPL
597008	2006 QR_{91}	—	July 21, 2006	Mount Lemmon	Mount Lemmon Survey	PHO	1.1 km	MPC · JPL
597009	2006 QS_{102}	—	August 27, 2006	Kitt Peak	Spacewatch	·	970 m	MPC · JPL
597010	2006 QF_{113}	—	June 20, 2006	Mount Lemmon	Mount Lemmon Survey	·	3.2 km	MPC · JPL
597011	2006 QX_{124}	—	August 29, 2006	Catalina	CSS	·	1.7 km	MPC · JPL
597012	2006 QJ_{125}	—	August 28, 2006	Catalina	CSS	·	500 m	MPC · JPL
597013	2006 QZ_{128}	—	August 17, 2006	Palomar	NEAT	·	2.2 km	MPC · JPL
597014	2006 QH_{129}	—	August 17, 2006	Palomar	NEAT	·	830 m	MPC · JPL
597015	2006 QL_{129}	—	July 21, 2006	Mount Lemmon	Mount Lemmon Survey	·	620 m	MPC · JPL
597016	2006 QY_{136}	—	August 23, 2006	Palomar	NEAT	·	2.8 km	MPC · JPL
597017	2006 QT_{151}	—	August 19, 2006	Kitt Peak	Spacewatch	·	720 m	MPC · JPL
597018	2006 QT_{152}	—	August 19, 2006	Kitt Peak	Spacewatch	KOR	1.1 km	MPC · JPL
597019	2006 QM_{154}	—	August 19, 2006	Kitt Peak	Spacewatch	·	2.2 km	MPC · JPL
597020	2006 QX_{169}	—	August 19, 2006	Kitt Peak	Spacewatch	TIN	1.0 km	MPC · JPL
597021	2006 QB_{180}	—	August 21, 2006	Kitt Peak	Spacewatch	THM	1.6 km	MPC · JPL
597022	2006 QT_{188}	—	March 28, 2015	Haleakala	Pan-STARRS 1	EOS	2.1 km	MPC · JPL
597023	2006 QD_{189}	—	February 28, 2014	Mount Lemmon	Mount Lemmon Survey	·	2.1 km	MPC · JPL
597024	2006 QH_{189}	—	December 2, 2010	Mount Lemmon	Mount Lemmon Survey	·	710 m	MPC · JPL
597025	2006 QJ_{189}	—	August 26, 2001	Palomar	NEAT	·	2.1 km	MPC · JPL
597026	2006 QO_{189}	—	January 21, 2015	Haleakala	Pan-STARRS 1	·	700 m	MPC · JPL
597027	2006 QY_{189}	—	August 26, 2013	Haleakala	Pan-STARRS 1	·	670 m	MPC · JPL
597028	2006 QP_{190}	—	April 30, 2014	Haleakala	Pan-STARRS 1	·	1.7 km	MPC · JPL
597029	2006 QU_{190}	—	August 28, 2006	Kitt Peak	Spacewatch	VER	2.6 km	MPC · JPL
597030	2006 QY_{190}	—	September 18, 2010	Mount Lemmon	Mount Lemmon Survey	·	880 m	MPC · JPL
597031	2006 QK_{191}	—	August 27, 2006	Kitt Peak	Spacewatch	·	960 m	MPC · JPL
597032	2006 QT_{192}	—	August 18, 2006	Kitt Peak	Spacewatch	V	510 m	MPC · JPL
597033	2006 QJ_{195}	—	August 19, 2006	Kitt Peak	Spacewatch	·	540 m	MPC · JPL
597034	2006 QJ_{196}	—	August 29, 2006	Catalina	CSS	·	610 m	MPC · JPL
597035	2006 QB_{197}	—	August 28, 2006	Kitt Peak	Spacewatch	·	2.4 km	MPC · JPL
597036	2006 QS_{200}	—	August 21, 2006	Kitt Peak	Spacewatch	V	550 m	MPC · JPL
597037	2006 QH_{202}	—	August 29, 2006	Kitt Peak	Spacewatch	·	730 m	MPC · JPL
597038	2006 QF_{203}	—	August 27, 2006	Kitt Peak	Spacewatch	KOR	1.2 km	MPC · JPL
597039	2006 QG_{203}	—	August 27, 2006	Kitt Peak	Spacewatch	AGN	850 m	MPC · JPL
597040	2006 QW_{203}	—	August 28, 2006	Kitt Peak	Spacewatch	MAS	510 m	MPC · JPL
597041	2006 RL_{12}	—	September 14, 2006	Kitt Peak	Spacewatch	·	2.8 km	MPC · JPL
597042	2006 RE_{24}	—	September 14, 2006	Kitt Peak	Spacewatch	EOS	1.7 km	MPC · JPL
597043	2006 RA_{28}	—	September 14, 2006	Kitt Peak	Spacewatch	·	2.0 km	MPC · JPL
597044	2006 RK_{28}	—	August 29, 2006	Catalina	CSS	·	440 m	MPC · JPL
597045	2006 RW_{45}	—	September 14, 2006	Kitt Peak	Spacewatch	·	1.6 km	MPC · JPL
597046	2006 RT_{49}	—	September 14, 2006	Kitt Peak	Spacewatch	·	530 m	MPC · JPL
597047	2006 RG_{51}	—	September 14, 2006	Kitt Peak	Spacewatch	·	1.8 km	MPC · JPL
597048	2006 RY_{64}	—	September 14, 2006	Kitt Peak	Spacewatch	·	2.2 km	MPC · JPL
597049	2006 RW_{65}	—	September 14, 2006	Catalina	CSS	·	690 m	MPC · JPL
597050	2006 RY_{81}	—	September 15, 2006	Kitt Peak	Spacewatch	·	1.0 km	MPC · JPL
597051	2006 RL_{91}	—	September 15, 2006	Kitt Peak	Spacewatch	·	2.4 km	MPC · JPL
597052	2006 RA_{106}	—	September 19, 2006	Kitt Peak	Spacewatch	·	730 m	MPC · JPL
597053	2006 RP_{110}	—	September 14, 2006	Mauna Kea	Masiero, J., R. Jedicke	NYS	970 m	MPC · JPL
597054	2006 RY_{110}	—	March 17, 2001	Kitt Peak	Spacewatch	·	850 m	MPC · JPL
597055	2006 RV_{114}	—	September 14, 2006	Mauna Kea	J. Masiero, R. Jedicke	·	1.6 km	MPC · JPL
597056	2006 RJ_{119}	—	January 1, 2008	Kitt Peak	Spacewatch	·	1.7 km	MPC · JPL
597057	2006 RW_{121}	—	September 16, 2006	Catalina	CSS	·	2.5 km	MPC · JPL
597058	2006 RQ_{123}	—	September 23, 2011	Haleakala	Pan-STARRS 1	·	1.4 km	MPC · JPL
597059	2006 RC_{124}	—	September 14, 2006	Kitt Peak	Spacewatch	·	3.1 km	MPC · JPL
597060	2006 RH_{125}	—	September 15, 2006	Kitt Peak	Spacewatch	·	840 m	MPC · JPL
597061	2006 RJ_{125}	—	September 15, 2006	Kitt Peak	Spacewatch	·	700 m	MPC · JPL
597062	2006 SE_{15}	—	July 21, 2006	Mount Lemmon	Mount Lemmon Survey	·	1.3 km	MPC · JPL
597063	2006 SK_{17}	—	September 17, 2006	Kitt Peak	Spacewatch	·	1.7 km	MPC · JPL
597064	2006 SW_{21}	—	September 17, 2006	Catalina	CSS	·	1.0 km	MPC · JPL
597065	2006 SP_{23}	—	September 18, 2006	Catalina	CSS	H	410 m	MPC · JPL
597066	2006 SV_{29}	—	March 9, 2005	Mount Lemmon	Mount Lemmon Survey	·	1.7 km	MPC · JPL
597067	2006 SZ_{34}	—	September 17, 2006	Kitt Peak	Spacewatch	·	740 m	MPC · JPL
597068	2006 SJ_{50}	—	September 16, 2006	Catalina	CSS	·	2.3 km	MPC · JPL
597069	2006 SL_{52}	—	September 19, 2006	Catalina	CSS	·	1.9 km	MPC · JPL
597070	2006 ST_{55}	—	September 18, 2006	Catalina	CSS	·	750 m	MPC · JPL
597071	2006 SX_{55}	—	September 18, 2006	Catalina	CSS	TIR	2.9 km	MPC · JPL
597072	2006 SU_{64}	—	September 20, 2006	Bergisch Gladbach	W. Bickel	·	1.4 km	MPC · JPL
597073	2006 SA_{65}	—	September 19, 2006	Kitt Peak	Spacewatch	·	1.0 km	MPC · JPL
597074	2006 SE_{69}	—	September 19, 2006	Kitt Peak	Spacewatch	·	1.9 km	MPC · JPL
597075	2006 SS_{69}	—	March 27, 1995	Kitt Peak	Spacewatch	·	1.9 km	MPC · JPL
597076	2006 SL_{78}	—	September 17, 2006	Kitt Peak	Spacewatch	·	2.2 km	MPC · JPL
597077	2006 SS_{83}	—	September 18, 2006	Kitt Peak	Spacewatch	·	600 m	MPC · JPL
597078	2006 SO_{88}	—	September 18, 2006	Kitt Peak	Spacewatch	KOR	1.1 km	MPC · JPL
597079	2006 SF_{103}	—	September 19, 2006	Kitt Peak	Spacewatch	·	1.4 km	MPC · JPL
597080	2006 SV_{106}	—	September 15, 2006	Kitt Peak	Spacewatch	LIX	2.8 km	MPC · JPL
597081	2006 SL_{110}	—	September 20, 2006	Catalina	CSS	·	1.6 km	MPC · JPL
597082	2006 SZ_{112}	—	April 4, 2005	Mount Lemmon	Mount Lemmon Survey	JUN	780 m	MPC · JPL
597083	2006 SH_{156}	—	September 15, 2006	Kitt Peak	Spacewatch	KOR	1.1 km	MPC · JPL
597084	2006 SN_{168}	—	September 25, 2006	Kitt Peak	Spacewatch	·	1.7 km	MPC · JPL
597085	2006 SR_{188}	—	September 26, 2006	Kitt Peak	Spacewatch	·	1.5 km	MPC · JPL
597086	2006 SP_{190}	—	September 19, 2006	Kitt Peak	Spacewatch	THM	1.4 km	MPC · JPL
597087	2006 SW_{190}	—	September 26, 2006	Mount Lemmon	Mount Lemmon Survey	·	1.2 km	MPC · JPL
597088	2006 SR_{199}	—	September 24, 2006	Kitt Peak	Spacewatch	·	1.8 km	MPC · JPL
597089	2006 SN_{210}	—	September 26, 2006	Mount Lemmon	Mount Lemmon Survey	·	1.5 km	MPC · JPL
597090	2006 SU_{212}	—	September 26, 2006	Catalina	CSS	·	2.0 km	MPC · JPL
597091	2006 SL_{216}	—	September 17, 2006	Kitt Peak	Spacewatch	HOF	2.3 km	MPC · JPL
597092	2006 SH_{224}	—	September 25, 2006	Kitt Peak	Spacewatch	·	2.7 km	MPC · JPL
597093	2006 SD_{225}	—	September 26, 2006	Kitt Peak	Spacewatch	NYS	1.1 km	MPC · JPL
597094	2006 SX_{234}	—	September 26, 2006	Kitt Peak	Spacewatch	·	1.9 km	MPC · JPL
597095	2006 SK_{235}	—	August 27, 2006	Kitt Peak	Spacewatch	V	490 m	MPC · JPL
597096	2006 SY_{249}	—	March 27, 2001	Kitt Peak	Spacewatch	·	1.2 km	MPC · JPL
597097	2006 SA_{264}	—	September 26, 2006	Kitt Peak	Spacewatch	·	2.5 km	MPC · JPL
597098	2006 SE_{274}	—	September 17, 2006	Kitt Peak	Spacewatch	·	1.1 km	MPC · JPL
597099	2006 SZ_{275}	—	September 28, 2006	Mount Lemmon	Mount Lemmon Survey	·	850 m	MPC · JPL
597100	2006 SJ_{277}	—	September 28, 2006	Kitt Peak	Spacewatch	KOR	1.4 km	MPC · JPL

== 597101–597200 ==
back to top

Designation			Discovery			Properties		Ref
Permanent	Provisional	Named after	Date	Site	Discoverer(s)	Category	Diam.	Ref
597101	2006 SK_{277}	—	September 28, 2006	Kitt Peak	Spacewatch	KOR	1.2 km	MPC · JPL
597102	2006 SA_{291}	—	September 16, 2006	Catalina	CSS	H	590 m	MPC · JPL
597103	2006 SG_{325}	—	September 27, 2006	Kitt Peak	Spacewatch	·	1.6 km	MPC · JPL
597104	2006 SV_{340}	—	September 28, 2006	Kitt Peak	Spacewatch	·	2.0 km	MPC · JPL
597105	2006 SH_{341}	—	September 28, 2006	Kitt Peak	Spacewatch	·	1.5 km	MPC · JPL
597106	2006 SZ_{346}	—	September 28, 2006	Kitt Peak	Spacewatch	KOR	1.2 km	MPC · JPL
597107	2006 SC_{361}	—	September 30, 2006	Mount Lemmon	Mount Lemmon Survey	·	580 m	MPC · JPL
597108	2006 SL_{362}	—	September 30, 2006	Mount Lemmon	Mount Lemmon Survey	·	1.9 km	MPC · JPL
597109	2006 SL_{365}	—	September 30, 2006	Mount Lemmon	Mount Lemmon Survey	(13314)	1.3 km	MPC · JPL
597110	2006 SV_{377}	—	September 17, 2006	Apache Point	SDSS Collaboration	EOS	1.3 km	MPC · JPL
597111	2006 SA_{378}	—	September 25, 2006	Mount Lemmon	Mount Lemmon Survey	·	1.5 km	MPC · JPL
597112	2006 ST_{385}	—	September 29, 2006	Apache Point	SDSS Collaboration	JUN	1.0 km	MPC · JPL
597113	2006 SU_{385}	—	September 29, 2006	Apache Point	SDSS Collaboration	PHO	1.1 km	MPC · JPL
597114	2006 SA_{386}	—	September 29, 2006	Apache Point	SDSS Collaboration	·	2.6 km	MPC · JPL
597115	2006 SZ_{407}	—	September 26, 2006	Mount Lemmon	Mount Lemmon Survey	HOF	1.9 km	MPC · JPL
597116	2006 SN_{418}	—	December 4, 2007	Mount Lemmon	Mount Lemmon Survey	·	880 m	MPC · JPL
597117	2006 SU_{422}	—	September 20, 2006	Catalina	CSS	PHO	680 m	MPC · JPL
597118	2006 SK_{424}	—	September 30, 2006	Mount Lemmon	Mount Lemmon Survey	·	1.5 km	MPC · JPL
597119	2006 SY_{424}	—	September 27, 2006	Mount Lemmon	Mount Lemmon Survey	·	1.7 km	MPC · JPL
597120	2006 SF_{425}	—	February 10, 2008	Mount Lemmon	Mount Lemmon Survey	·	2.2 km	MPC · JPL
597121	2006 SG_{425}	—	September 18, 2006	Kitt Peak	Spacewatch	THM	1.8 km	MPC · JPL
597122	2006 SK_{425}	—	September 26, 2006	Mount Lemmon	Mount Lemmon Survey	·	1.8 km	MPC · JPL
597123	2006 SM_{425}	—	September 27, 2006	Kitt Peak	Spacewatch	·	580 m	MPC · JPL
597124	2006 SV_{426}	—	September 30, 2006	Kitt Peak	Spacewatch	·	1.7 km	MPC · JPL
597125	2006 SJ_{428}	—	March 11, 2016	Haleakala	Pan-STARRS 1	NYS	910 m	MPC · JPL
597126	2006 SU_{428}	—	June 18, 2013	Haleakala	Pan-STARRS 1	·	760 m	MPC · JPL
597127	2006 SE_{429}	—	September 19, 2006	Kitt Peak	Spacewatch	·	1.6 km	MPC · JPL
597128	2006 SE_{430}	—	September 17, 2006	Kitt Peak	Spacewatch	·	950 m	MPC · JPL
597129	2006 SY_{432}	—	April 5, 2014	Haleakala	Pan-STARRS 1	·	1.7 km	MPC · JPL
597130	2006 SH_{434}	—	March 2, 2009	Mount Lemmon	Mount Lemmon Survey	·	1.7 km	MPC · JPL
597131	2006 SQ_{435}	—	January 21, 2014	Mount Lemmon	Mount Lemmon Survey	·	2.1 km	MPC · JPL
597132	2006 SX_{435}	—	September 16, 2006	Kitt Peak	Spacewatch	·	890 m	MPC · JPL
597133	2006 SP_{436}	—	September 18, 2006	Kitt Peak	Spacewatch	·	1.2 km	MPC · JPL
597134	2006 SX_{439}	—	December 14, 2010	Mount Lemmon	Mount Lemmon Survey	·	650 m	MPC · JPL
597135	2006 SG_{440}	—	September 25, 2006	Kitt Peak	Spacewatch	·	1.5 km	MPC · JPL
597136	2006 SV_{440}	—	March 15, 2012	Kitt Peak	Spacewatch	·	890 m	MPC · JPL
597137	2006 SH_{448}	—	September 19, 2006	Kitt Peak	Spacewatch	NYS	730 m	MPC · JPL
597138	2006 ST_{448}	—	September 25, 2006	Kitt Peak	Spacewatch	·	640 m	MPC · JPL
597139	2006 SN_{449}	—	September 27, 2006	Mount Lemmon	Mount Lemmon Survey	·	640 m	MPC · JPL
597140	2006 SZ_{450}	—	September 30, 2006	Kitt Peak	Spacewatch	VER	2.3 km	MPC · JPL
597141	2006 SS_{451}	—	September 26, 2006	Kitt Peak	Spacewatch	·	430 m	MPC · JPL
597142	2006 SA_{452}	—	September 17, 2006	Kitt Peak	Spacewatch	·	1.3 km	MPC · JPL
597143	2006 SW_{452}	—	September 25, 2006	Mount Lemmon	Mount Lemmon Survey	AST	1.4 km	MPC · JPL
597144	2006 SB_{453}	—	September 26, 2006	Kitt Peak	Spacewatch	·	1.4 km	MPC · JPL
597145	2006 SX_{455}	—	September 18, 2006	Kitt Peak	Spacewatch	·	1.7 km	MPC · JPL
597146	2006 TD_{10}	—	October 13, 2006	Pla D'Arguines	R. Ferrando, Ferrando, M.	·	2.4 km	MPC · JPL
597147	2006 TP_{56}	—	October 3, 2006	Mount Lemmon	Mount Lemmon Survey	(16286)	1.6 km	MPC · JPL
597148 Chungmingshan	2006 TV_{56}	Chungmingshan	October 14, 2006	Lulin	LUSS	·	1.4 km	MPC · JPL
597149	2006 TC_{76}	—	October 11, 2006	Palomar	NEAT	MAS	700 m	MPC · JPL
597150	2006 TZ_{93}	—	September 30, 2006	Mount Lemmon	Mount Lemmon Survey	·	1.7 km	MPC · JPL
597151	2006 TU_{110}	—	October 1, 2006	Apache Point	SDSS Collaboration	LIX	2.3 km	MPC · JPL
597152	2006 TO_{113}	—	September 18, 2006	Apache Point	SDSS Collaboration	·	2.0 km	MPC · JPL
597153	2006 TS_{116}	—	October 30, 2006	Mount Lemmon	Mount Lemmon Survey	·	2.3 km	MPC · JPL
597154	2006 TA_{132}	—	October 2, 2006	Mount Lemmon	Mount Lemmon Survey	·	990 m	MPC · JPL
597155	2006 TS_{132}	—	October 2, 2006	Mount Lemmon	Mount Lemmon Survey	·	1.0 km	MPC · JPL
597156	2006 TX_{133}	—	September 25, 2006	Catalina	CSS	·	780 m	MPC · JPL
597157	2006 TQ_{137}	—	November 12, 2012	Mount Lemmon	Mount Lemmon Survey	·	1.8 km	MPC · JPL
597158	2006 TL_{140}	—	October 3, 2006	Mount Lemmon	Mount Lemmon Survey	NYS	1.1 km	MPC · JPL
597159	2006 TE_{143}	—	October 2, 2006	Mount Lemmon	Mount Lemmon Survey	·	2.3 km	MPC · JPL
597160	2006 TQ_{143}	—	October 13, 2006	Kitt Peak	Spacewatch	·	2.1 km	MPC · JPL
597161	2006 TL_{144}	—	October 3, 2006	Mount Lemmon	Mount Lemmon Survey	·	1.5 km	MPC · JPL
597162	2006 UB_{18}	—	September 14, 2006	Kitt Peak	Spacewatch	·	2.4 km	MPC · JPL
597163	2006 UO_{22}	—	October 16, 2006	Mount Lemmon	Mount Lemmon Survey	·	520 m	MPC · JPL
597164	2006 US_{22}	—	August 28, 2006	Kitt Peak	Spacewatch	·	470 m	MPC · JPL
597165	2006 UQ_{28}	—	September 26, 2006	Mount Lemmon	Mount Lemmon Survey	·	1.2 km	MPC · JPL
597166	2006 UH_{31}	—	October 16, 2006	Kitt Peak	Spacewatch	·	2.2 km	MPC · JPL
597167	2006 UH_{35}	—	October 16, 2006	Kitt Peak	Spacewatch	·	1.9 km	MPC · JPL
597168	2006 UN_{40}	—	September 26, 2006	Mount Lemmon	Mount Lemmon Survey	·	2.2 km	MPC · JPL
597169	2006 UJ_{44}	—	October 16, 2006	Kitt Peak	Spacewatch	·	1.5 km	MPC · JPL
597170	2006 UJ_{56}	—	July 5, 2000	Kitt Peak	Spacewatch	EOS	2.0 km	MPC · JPL
597171	2006 UD_{63}	—	October 21, 2006	Mount Lemmon	Mount Lemmon Survey	AMO	580 m	MPC · JPL
597172	2006 UH_{83}	—	November 12, 2001	Apache Point	SDSS Collaboration	AGN	1.3 km	MPC · JPL
597173	2006 UE_{99}	—	October 18, 2006	Kitt Peak	Spacewatch	·	2.0 km	MPC · JPL
597174	2006 US_{113}	—	October 19, 2006	Kitt Peak	Spacewatch	·	880 m	MPC · JPL
597175	2006 UJ_{120}	—	September 30, 2006	Mount Lemmon	Mount Lemmon Survey	·	1.7 km	MPC · JPL
597176	2006 UB_{125}	—	October 2, 2006	Mount Lemmon	Mount Lemmon Survey	·	1.3 km	MPC · JPL
597177	2006 UC_{153}	—	October 21, 2006	Kitt Peak	Spacewatch	·	1.7 km	MPC · JPL
597178	2006 UC_{159}	—	October 11, 2006	Palomar	NEAT	·	980 m	MPC · JPL
597179	2006 UK_{161}	—	October 21, 2006	Mount Lemmon	Mount Lemmon Survey	·	1.6 km	MPC · JPL
597180	2006 UR_{180}	—	March 23, 2003	Apache Point	SDSS Collaboration	·	3.2 km	MPC · JPL
597181	2006 UB_{192}	—	October 4, 2006	Mount Lemmon	Mount Lemmon Survey	·	900 m	MPC · JPL
597182	2006 UN_{197}	—	October 13, 2006	Kitt Peak	Spacewatch	·	2.4 km	MPC · JPL
597183	2006 UD_{206}	—	September 26, 2006	Mount Lemmon	Mount Lemmon Survey	·	2.1 km	MPC · JPL
597184	2006 UG_{210}	—	October 23, 2006	Kitt Peak	Spacewatch	EOS	1.4 km	MPC · JPL
597185	2006 UB_{212}	—	October 14, 1999	Kitt Peak	Spacewatch	·	680 m	MPC · JPL
597186	2006 UP_{223}	—	September 27, 2006	Kitt Peak	Spacewatch	·	1.7 km	MPC · JPL
597187	2006 UB_{228}	—	October 16, 2006	Catalina	CSS	·	570 m	MPC · JPL
597188	2006 UP_{236}	—	October 23, 2006	Kitt Peak	Spacewatch	·	660 m	MPC · JPL
597189	2006 UE_{282}	—	October 12, 2006	Kitt Peak	Spacewatch	·	1.5 km	MPC · JPL
597190	2006 UX_{294}	—	October 19, 2006	Kitt Peak	Deep Ecliptic Survey	·	2.1 km	MPC · JPL
597191	2006 UZ_{298}	—	September 28, 2006	Mount Lemmon	Mount Lemmon Survey	·	1.6 km	MPC · JPL
597192	2006 UO_{301}	—	April 6, 2005	Mount Lemmon	Mount Lemmon Survey	MAS	710 m	MPC · JPL
597193	2006 US_{302}	—	March 10, 2005	Mount Lemmon	Mount Lemmon Survey	·	1.3 km	MPC · JPL
597194	2006 UE_{305}	—	October 19, 2006	Kitt Peak	Deep Ecliptic Survey	MAS	640 m	MPC · JPL
597195	2006 UQ_{318}	—	October 31, 2006	Mount Lemmon	Mount Lemmon Survey	·	1.1 km	MPC · JPL
597196	2006 UZ_{330}	—	October 16, 2006	Apache Point	SDSS Collaboration	·	1.9 km	MPC · JPL
597197	2006 UA_{343}	—	October 26, 2006	Mauna Kea	P. A. Wiegert	·	880 m	MPC · JPL
597198	2006 UU_{352}	—	October 26, 2006	Mauna Kea	P. A. Wiegert	·	550 m	MPC · JPL
597199	2006 UY_{352}	—	October 26, 2006	Mauna Kea	P. A. Wiegert	·	920 m	MPC · JPL
597200	2006 UV_{355}	—	November 12, 2006	Mount Lemmon	Mount Lemmon Survey	·	1.5 km	MPC · JPL

== 597201–597300 ==
back to top

Designation			Discovery			Properties		Ref
Permanent	Provisional	Named after	Date	Site	Discoverer(s)	Category	Diam.	Ref
597201	2006 UP_{362}	—	October 28, 2006	Mount Lemmon	Mount Lemmon Survey	·	1.4 km	MPC · JPL
597202	2006 UB_{366}	—	October 20, 2011	Kitt Peak	Spacewatch	·	1.8 km	MPC · JPL
597203	2006 UV_{366}	—	October 16, 2006	Kitt Peak	Spacewatch	V	500 m	MPC · JPL
597204	2006 UY_{372}	—	October 22, 2006	Catalina	CSS	TIN	990 m	MPC · JPL
597205	2006 UR_{373}	—	September 8, 2011	Kitt Peak	Spacewatch	·	1.7 km	MPC · JPL
597206	2006 UT_{377}	—	September 25, 2006	Mount Lemmon	Mount Lemmon Survey	NAE	1.8 km	MPC · JPL
597207	2006 UG_{379}	—	October 23, 2006	Mount Lemmon	Mount Lemmon Survey	·	1.7 km	MPC · JPL
597208	2006 UE_{380}	—	December 5, 2007	Kitt Peak	Spacewatch	·	2.4 km	MPC · JPL
597209	2006 UA_{383}	—	October 18, 2006	Kitt Peak	Spacewatch	·	1.6 km	MPC · JPL
597210	2006 UG_{386}	—	October 22, 2006	Palomar	NEAT	·	640 m	MPC · JPL
597211	2006 UO_{386}	—	October 21, 2006	Mount Lemmon	Mount Lemmon Survey	·	1.7 km	MPC · JPL
597212	2006 UA_{387}	—	October 27, 2006	Catalina	CSS	·	1.1 km	MPC · JPL
597213	2006 UH_{389}	—	October 31, 2006	Mount Lemmon	Mount Lemmon Survey	VER	1.9 km	MPC · JPL
597214	2006 UL_{390}	—	October 21, 2006	Mount Lemmon	Mount Lemmon Survey	·	490 m	MPC · JPL
597215	2006 UV_{390}	—	October 16, 2006	Kitt Peak	Spacewatch	·	1.4 km	MPC · JPL
597216	2006 VR_{1}	—	October 27, 2006	Catalina	CSS	H	430 m	MPC · JPL
597217	2006 VE_{18}	—	October 21, 2006	Kitt Peak	Spacewatch	·	1.5 km	MPC · JPL
597218	2006 VR_{28}	—	October 20, 2006	Mount Lemmon	Mount Lemmon Survey	·	520 m	MPC · JPL
597219	2006 VP_{36}	—	October 21, 2006	Mount Lemmon	Mount Lemmon Survey	V	700 m	MPC · JPL
597220	2006 VJ_{42}	—	November 12, 2006	Mount Lemmon	Mount Lemmon Survey	HOF	2.0 km	MPC · JPL
597221	2006 VL_{43}	—	October 19, 2006	Mount Lemmon	Mount Lemmon Survey	·	1.4 km	MPC · JPL
597222	2006 VT_{47}	—	October 18, 2006	Kitt Peak	Spacewatch	H	380 m	MPC · JPL
597223	2006 VL_{87}	—	October 22, 2006	Palomar	NEAT	ERI	1.9 km	MPC · JPL
597224	2006 VZ_{93}	—	November 15, 2006	Mount Lemmon	Mount Lemmon Survey	·	1.6 km	MPC · JPL
597225	2006 VA_{99}	—	October 21, 2006	Mount Lemmon	Mount Lemmon Survey	·	2.1 km	MPC · JPL
597226	2006 VU_{103}	—	November 12, 2006	Lulin	LUSS	·	820 m	MPC · JPL
597227	2006 VG_{105}	—	October 23, 2006	Kitt Peak	Spacewatch	·	2.8 km	MPC · JPL
597228	2006 VD_{106}	—	October 16, 2006	Catalina	CSS	PHO	900 m	MPC · JPL
597229	2006 VL_{117}	—	October 20, 2006	Mount Lemmon	Mount Lemmon Survey	·	850 m	MPC · JPL
597230	2006 VD_{123}	—	September 19, 1998	Apache Point	SDSS	·	1.3 km	MPC · JPL
597231	2006 VD_{125}	—	October 31, 2006	Mount Lemmon	Mount Lemmon Survey	T_{j} (2.99)	3.6 km	MPC · JPL
597232	2006 VS_{131}	—	May 19, 2005	Mount Lemmon	Mount Lemmon Survey	·	690 m	MPC · JPL
597233	2006 VV_{137}	—	November 15, 2006	Kitt Peak	Spacewatch	·	1.4 km	MPC · JPL
597234	2006 VO_{176}	—	November 10, 2006	Kitt Peak	Spacewatch	·	1.5 km	MPC · JPL
597235	2006 VR_{179}	—	November 15, 2006	Kitt Peak	Spacewatch	·	800 m	MPC · JPL
597236	2006 VH_{180}	—	October 19, 2011	Kitt Peak	Spacewatch	·	1.6 km	MPC · JPL
597237	2006 VZ_{181}	—	November 11, 2006	Kitt Peak	Spacewatch	·	2.2 km	MPC · JPL
597238	2006 VX_{184}	—	November 11, 2006	Mount Lemmon	Mount Lemmon Survey	V	590 m	MPC · JPL
597239	2006 WQ_{24}	—	November 17, 2006	Mount Lemmon	Mount Lemmon Survey	·	640 m	MPC · JPL
597240	2006 WO_{28}	—	November 22, 2006	Mauna Kea	D. D. Balam, K. M. Perrett	·	1.5 km	MPC · JPL
597241	2006 WV_{41}	—	November 16, 2006	Mount Lemmon	Mount Lemmon Survey	·	1.3 km	MPC · JPL
597242	2006 WQ_{43}	—	November 16, 2006	Mount Lemmon	Mount Lemmon Survey	·	1.2 km	MPC · JPL
597243	2006 WR_{48}	—	November 16, 2006	Kitt Peak	Spacewatch	·	1.5 km	MPC · JPL
597244	2006 WW_{60}	—	October 3, 2006	Mount Lemmon	Mount Lemmon Survey	EOS	1.6 km	MPC · JPL
597245	2006 WM_{63}	—	March 23, 2004	Kitt Peak	Spacewatch	·	1.3 km	MPC · JPL
597246	2006 WK_{64}	—	November 17, 2006	Mount Lemmon	Mount Lemmon Survey	·	3.2 km	MPC · JPL
597247	2006 WY_{73}	—	November 18, 2006	Kitt Peak	Spacewatch	·	690 m	MPC · JPL
597248	2006 WZ_{80}	—	November 18, 2006	Kitt Peak	Spacewatch	·	1.5 km	MPC · JPL
597249	2006 WF_{87}	—	November 18, 2006	Mount Lemmon	Mount Lemmon Survey	·	1.3 km	MPC · JPL
597250	2006 WU_{115}	—	November 20, 2006	Mount Lemmon	Mount Lemmon Survey	·	2.1 km	MPC · JPL
597251	2006 WJ_{125}	—	November 22, 2006	Mount Lemmon	Mount Lemmon Survey	V	520 m	MPC · JPL
597252	2006 WB_{138}	—	October 12, 2006	Palomar	NEAT	(2076)	810 m	MPC · JPL
597253	2006 WZ_{140}	—	November 20, 2006	Kitt Peak	Spacewatch	·	2.4 km	MPC · JPL
597254	2006 WQ_{145}	—	November 20, 2006	Mount Lemmon	Mount Lemmon Survey	V	540 m	MPC · JPL
597255	2006 WA_{147}	—	November 20, 2006	Kitt Peak	Spacewatch	·	800 m	MPC · JPL
597256	2006 WM_{160}	—	November 22, 2006	Kitt Peak	Spacewatch	·	1.8 km	MPC · JPL
597257	2006 WR_{161}	—	November 15, 2006	Kitt Peak	Spacewatch	·	510 m	MPC · JPL
597258	2006 WC_{164}	—	November 11, 2006	Kitt Peak	Spacewatch	·	1.1 km	MPC · JPL
597259	2006 WO_{166}	—	October 28, 2006	Mount Lemmon	Mount Lemmon Survey	·	620 m	MPC · JPL
597260	2006 WB_{184}	—	November 25, 2006	Mount Lemmon	Mount Lemmon Survey	EOS	1.5 km	MPC · JPL
597261	2006 WE_{186}	—	November 20, 2006	Catalina	CSS	·	1.3 km	MPC · JPL
597262	2006 WX_{186}	—	November 23, 2006	Mount Lemmon	Mount Lemmon Survey	·	1.2 km	MPC · JPL
597263	2006 WV_{209}	—	October 13, 2010	Mount Lemmon	Mount Lemmon Survey	·	980 m	MPC · JPL
597264	2006 WT_{210}	—	November 17, 2006	Kitt Peak	Spacewatch	·	1.1 km	MPC · JPL
597265	2006 WU_{211}	—	February 11, 2008	Mount Lemmon	Mount Lemmon Survey	·	1.9 km	MPC · JPL
597266	2006 WW_{211}	—	February 3, 2008	Mount Lemmon	Mount Lemmon Survey	·	2.4 km	MPC · JPL
597267	2006 WY_{211}	—	November 21, 2006	Mount Lemmon	Mount Lemmon Survey	·	2.8 km	MPC · JPL
597268	2006 WM_{212}	—	April 27, 2012	Haleakala	Pan-STARRS 1	V	570 m	MPC · JPL
597269	2006 WC_{213}	—	October 9, 2013	Mount Lemmon	Mount Lemmon Survey	·	780 m	MPC · JPL
597270	2006 WB_{217}	—	February 11, 2008	Mount Lemmon	Mount Lemmon Survey	·	820 m	MPC · JPL
597271	2006 WC_{217}	—	March 28, 2008	Mount Lemmon	Mount Lemmon Survey	·	770 m	MPC · JPL
597272	2006 WT_{217}	—	February 2, 2008	Kitt Peak	Spacewatch	·	2.1 km	MPC · JPL
597273	2006 WW_{218}	—	January 12, 2011	Mount Lemmon	Mount Lemmon Survey	·	620 m	MPC · JPL
597274	2006 WQ_{219}	—	July 3, 2015	Haleakala	Pan-STARRS 1	·	2.2 km	MPC · JPL
597275	2006 WR_{219}	—	November 16, 2006	Mount Lemmon	Mount Lemmon Survey	H	430 m	MPC · JPL
597276	2006 WN_{221}	—	November 17, 2006	Mount Lemmon	Mount Lemmon Survey	PHO	900 m	MPC · JPL
597277	2006 WC_{223}	—	February 24, 2014	Haleakala	Pan-STARRS 1	·	2.6 km	MPC · JPL
597278	2006 WO_{225}	—	December 23, 2011	Sandlot	G. Hug	·	3.5 km	MPC · JPL
597279	2006 WL_{229}	—	November 23, 2006	Kitt Peak	Spacewatch	·	750 m	MPC · JPL
597280	2006 WO_{235}	—	November 19, 2006	Kitt Peak	Spacewatch	·	1.8 km	MPC · JPL
597281	2006 XE_{3}	—	December 12, 2006	Socorro	LINEAR	T_{j} (2.92)	3.8 km	MPC · JPL
597282	2006 XC_{10}	—	November 18, 2006	Kitt Peak	Spacewatch	·	740 m	MPC · JPL
597283	2006 XW_{22}	—	December 12, 2006	Kitt Peak	Spacewatch	·	1.4 km	MPC · JPL
597284	2006 XY_{47}	—	December 13, 2006	Kitt Peak	Spacewatch	·	750 m	MPC · JPL
597285	2006 XZ_{54}	—	December 15, 2006	Socorro	LINEAR	BAR	1.4 km	MPC · JPL
597286	2006 XJ_{68}	—	November 16, 2006	Kitt Peak	Spacewatch	·	1.1 km	MPC · JPL
597287	2006 XD_{73}	—	December 13, 2006	Mount Lemmon	Mount Lemmon Survey	EOS	1.7 km	MPC · JPL
597288	2006 XJ_{74}	—	May 20, 2005	Mount Lemmon	Mount Lemmon Survey	·	3.2 km	MPC · JPL
597289	2006 XT_{74}	—	December 12, 2006	Kitt Peak	Spacewatch	·	910 m	MPC · JPL
597290	2006 XY_{74}	—	December 15, 2006	Mount Lemmon	Mount Lemmon Survey	THB	3.0 km	MPC · JPL
597291	2006 XV_{76}	—	December 11, 2006	Kitt Peak	Spacewatch	·	2.2 km	MPC · JPL
597292	2006 XR_{77}	—	December 13, 2006	Mount Lemmon	Mount Lemmon Survey	·	1.8 km	MPC · JPL
597293	2006 XT_{78}	—	January 23, 2018	Mount Lemmon	Mount Lemmon Survey	·	1.4 km	MPC · JPL
597294	2006 YA_{37}	—	December 21, 2006	Kitt Peak	Spacewatch	·	1.2 km	MPC · JPL
597295	2006 YB_{42}	—	December 22, 2006	Kitt Peak	Spacewatch	EOS	2.6 km	MPC · JPL
597296	2006 YJ_{46}	—	December 21, 2006	Mount Lemmon	Mount Lemmon Survey	·	2.6 km	MPC · JPL
597297	2006 YN_{48}	—	December 24, 2006	Mount Lemmon	Mount Lemmon Survey	T_{j} (2.97)	3.6 km	MPC · JPL
597298	2006 YB_{60}	—	December 16, 2006	Kitt Peak	Spacewatch	·	1.9 km	MPC · JPL
597299	2006 YD_{64}	—	December 24, 2006	Kitt Peak	Spacewatch	·	710 m	MPC · JPL
597300	2006 YE_{64}	—	December 27, 2006	Mount Lemmon	Mount Lemmon Survey	·	2.2 km	MPC · JPL

== 597301–597400 ==
back to top

Designation			Discovery			Properties		Ref
Permanent	Provisional	Named after	Date	Site	Discoverer(s)	Category	Diam.	Ref
597301	2006 YN_{64}	—	December 21, 2006	Kitt Peak	L. H. Wasserman, M. W. Buie	·	460 m	MPC · JPL
597302	2006 YZ_{64}	—	December 26, 2006	Kitt Peak	Spacewatch	·	1.8 km	MPC · JPL
597303	2006 YL_{65}	—	December 24, 2017	Haleakala	Pan-STARRS 1	EOS	1.4 km	MPC · JPL
597304	2006 YU_{67}	—	December 27, 2006	Mount Lemmon	Mount Lemmon Survey	·	1.9 km	MPC · JPL
597305	2007 AF_{31}	—	April 1, 2003	Apache Point	SDSS Collaboration	·	2.8 km	MPC · JPL
597306	2007 AV_{32}	—	January 15, 2007	Mauna Kea	P. A. Wiegert	·	880 m	MPC · JPL
597307	2007 AB_{36}	—	January 10, 2007	Kitt Peak	Spacewatch	·	2.3 km	MPC · JPL
597308	2007 BG_{2}	—	January 16, 2007	Catalina	CSS	JUN	970 m	MPC · JPL
597309	2007 BP_{17}	—	December 21, 2006	Catalina	CSS	PHO	1.2 km	MPC · JPL
597310	2007 BU_{24}	—	January 17, 2007	Kitt Peak	Spacewatch	·	670 m	MPC · JPL
597311	2007 BR_{31}	—	January 9, 2007	Mount Lemmon	Mount Lemmon Survey	·	1.6 km	MPC · JPL
597312	2007 BS_{34}	—	January 24, 2007	Mount Lemmon	Mount Lemmon Survey	·	2.1 km	MPC · JPL
597313	2007 BR_{50}	—	January 24, 2007	Mount Lemmon	Mount Lemmon Survey	·	2.2 km	MPC · JPL
597314	2007 BJ_{52}	—	January 24, 2007	Kitt Peak	Spacewatch	·	2.5 km	MPC · JPL
597315	2007 BK_{57}	—	January 24, 2007	Socorro	LINEAR	·	2.6 km	MPC · JPL
597316	2007 BF_{67}	—	December 27, 2006	Mount Lemmon	Mount Lemmon Survey	·	2.4 km	MPC · JPL
597317	2007 BX_{85}	—	April 28, 2008	Kitt Peak	Spacewatch	·	1.0 km	MPC · JPL
597318	2007 BS_{93}	—	January 19, 2007	Mauna Kea	P. A. Wiegert	·	2.2 km	MPC · JPL
597319 Roxanesouad	2007 BZ_{99}	Roxanesouad	September 2, 2005	Saint-Sulpice	B. Christophe	·	1.1 km	MPC · JPL
597320	2007 BS_{105}	—	January 28, 2007	Mount Lemmon	Mount Lemmon Survey	·	2.5 km	MPC · JPL
597321	2007 BV_{105}	—	January 25, 2007	Kitt Peak	Spacewatch	ADE	1.3 km	MPC · JPL
597322	2007 BO_{106}	—	June 27, 2014	Haleakala	Pan-STARRS 1	LIX	2.6 km	MPC · JPL
597323	2007 BK_{107}	—	January 27, 2007	Kitt Peak	Spacewatch	EOS	1.5 km	MPC · JPL
597324	2007 BS_{109}	—	October 12, 2015	Haleakala	Pan-STARRS 1	·	2.2 km	MPC · JPL
597325	2007 BF_{110}	—	January 28, 2007	Kitt Peak	Spacewatch	·	2.8 km	MPC · JPL
597326	2007 BV_{110}	—	March 19, 2013	Haleakala	Pan-STARRS 1	THM	1.8 km	MPC · JPL
597327	2007 BL_{113}	—	January 17, 2007	Kitt Peak	Spacewatch	·	830 m	MPC · JPL
597328	2007 BS_{113}	—	August 21, 2015	Haleakala	Pan-STARRS 1	EOS	1.7 km	MPC · JPL
597329	2007 BX_{115}	—	December 27, 2006	Mount Lemmon	Mount Lemmon Survey	·	2.1 km	MPC · JPL
597330	2007 BG_{117}	—	January 27, 2007	Mount Lemmon	Mount Lemmon Survey	·	750 m	MPC · JPL
597331	2007 BS_{118}	—	January 17, 2007	Kitt Peak	Spacewatch	·	1.1 km	MPC · JPL
597332	2007 CD_{2}	—	February 6, 2007	Mount Lemmon	Mount Lemmon Survey	·	2.1 km	MPC · JPL
597333	2007 CM_{8}	—	January 24, 2007	Mount Lemmon	Mount Lemmon Survey	·	1.8 km	MPC · JPL
597334	2007 CV_{16}	—	January 17, 2007	Catalina	CSS	·	2.7 km	MPC · JPL
597335	2007 CK_{30}	—	January 27, 2007	Mount Lemmon	Mount Lemmon Survey	·	420 m	MPC · JPL
597336	2007 CU_{30}	—	February 6, 2007	Mount Lemmon	Mount Lemmon Survey	·	2.2 km	MPC · JPL
597337	2007 CS_{35}	—	February 6, 2007	Mount Lemmon	Mount Lemmon Survey	·	2.4 km	MPC · JPL
597338	2007 CA_{41}	—	February 7, 2007	Kitt Peak	Spacewatch	EOS	1.6 km	MPC · JPL
597339	2007 CY_{42}	—	January 27, 2007	Kitt Peak	Spacewatch	·	1.5 km	MPC · JPL
597340	2007 CT_{61}	—	February 13, 2007	Mount Lemmon	Mount Lemmon Survey	·	2.2 km	MPC · JPL
597341	2007 CW_{68}	—	February 14, 2007	Mauna Kea	P. A. Wiegert	·	1.6 km	MPC · JPL
597342	2007 CQ_{69}	—	July 24, 2001	Palomar	NEAT	·	1.2 km	MPC · JPL
597343	2007 CK_{81}	—	June 15, 2009	Mount Lemmon	Mount Lemmon Survey	T_{j} (2.97)	4.0 km	MPC · JPL
597344	2007 CG_{82}	—	February 6, 2007	Mount Lemmon	Mount Lemmon Survey	EOS	1.4 km	MPC · JPL
597345	2007 CW_{82}	—	March 8, 2013	Haleakala	Pan-STARRS 1	·	2.1 km	MPC · JPL
597346	2007 CY_{82}	—	February 6, 2007	Kitt Peak	Spacewatch	·	990 m	MPC · JPL
597347	2007 CK_{84}	—	February 10, 2007	Mount Lemmon	Mount Lemmon Survey	·	510 m	MPC · JPL
597348	2007 DL_{3}	—	February 16, 2007	Mount Lemmon	Mount Lemmon Survey	·	2.4 km	MPC · JPL
597349	2007 DQ_{4}	—	January 13, 2003	Socorro	LINEAR	·	1.5 km	MPC · JPL
597350	2007 DL_{12}	—	February 16, 2007	Catalina	CSS	·	1.3 km	MPC · JPL
597351	2007 DK_{31}	—	February 17, 2007	Kitt Peak	Spacewatch	EOS	1.7 km	MPC · JPL
597352	2007 DJ_{43}	—	February 17, 2007	Catalina	CSS	·	2.0 km	MPC · JPL
597353	2007 DX_{43}	—	February 17, 2007	Mount Lemmon	Mount Lemmon Survey	·	3.1 km	MPC · JPL
597354	2007 DS_{47}	—	February 10, 2007	Mount Lemmon	Mount Lemmon Survey	·	910 m	MPC · JPL
597355	2007 DT_{50}	—	September 23, 2005	Kitt Peak	Spacewatch	(5)	1.3 km	MPC · JPL
597356	2007 DX_{59}	—	January 27, 2007	Mount Lemmon	Mount Lemmon Survey	·	1.1 km	MPC · JPL
597357	2007 DM_{62}	—	February 21, 2007	Kitt Peak	Spacewatch	·	1.5 km	MPC · JPL
597358	2007 DP_{66}	—	February 21, 2007	Kitt Peak	Spacewatch	·	2.6 km	MPC · JPL
597359	2007 DS_{66}	—	February 21, 2007	Kitt Peak	Spacewatch	·	2.6 km	MPC · JPL
597360	2007 DE_{81}	—	February 23, 2007	Mount Lemmon	Mount Lemmon Survey	·	1.1 km	MPC · JPL
597361	2007 DW_{81}	—	February 23, 2007	Kitt Peak	Spacewatch	·	2.6 km	MPC · JPL
597362	2007 DH_{84}	—	April 5, 2003	Kitt Peak	Spacewatch	·	1.0 km	MPC · JPL
597363	2007 DN_{91}	—	January 27, 2007	Mount Lemmon	Mount Lemmon Survey	·	2.4 km	MPC · JPL
597364	2007 DQ_{100}	—	February 9, 2003	Kitt Peak	Spacewatch	·	990 m	MPC · JPL
597365	2007 DP_{103}	—	February 25, 2007	Kitt Peak	Spacewatch	·	2.5 km	MPC · JPL
597366	2007 DU_{108}	—	January 27, 2007	Kitt Peak	Spacewatch	EOS	1.4 km	MPC · JPL
597367	2007 DU_{109}	—	February 21, 2007	Mount Lemmon	Mount Lemmon Survey	·	3.7 km	MPC · JPL
597368	2007 DZ_{111}	—	February 26, 2007	Mount Lemmon	Mount Lemmon Survey	·	2.9 km	MPC · JPL
597369	2007 DH_{114}	—	February 26, 2007	Mount Lemmon	Mount Lemmon Survey	T_{j} (2.95) · 3:2	4.7 km	MPC · JPL
597370	2007 DC_{115}	—	February 21, 2007	Mount Lemmon	Mount Lemmon Survey	·	2.5 km	MPC · JPL
597371	2007 DU_{118}	—	February 25, 2007	Kitt Peak	Spacewatch	·	2.8 km	MPC · JPL
597372	2007 DZ_{118}	—	February 16, 2007	Mount Lemmon	Mount Lemmon Survey	·	1.1 km	MPC · JPL
597373	2007 DG_{119}	—	February 21, 2007	Mount Lemmon	Mount Lemmon Survey	·	480 m	MPC · JPL
597374	2007 DA_{120}	—	February 25, 2007	Kitt Peak	Spacewatch	VER	2.5 km	MPC · JPL
597375	2007 DG_{120}	—	February 25, 2007	Mount Lemmon	Mount Lemmon Survey	·	2.6 km	MPC · JPL
597376	2007 DJ_{120}	—	February 25, 2007	Kitt Peak	Spacewatch	VER	2.5 km	MPC · JPL
597377	2007 DG_{122}	—	September 9, 2015	Haleakala	Pan-STARRS 1	·	2.3 km	MPC · JPL
597378	2007 DE_{123}	—	February 21, 2007	Mount Lemmon	Mount Lemmon Survey	EOS	1.7 km	MPC · JPL
597379	2007 DT_{123}	—	November 4, 2016	Haleakala	Pan-STARRS 1	·	2.0 km	MPC · JPL
597380	2007 DQ_{124}	—	February 25, 2007	Mount Lemmon	Mount Lemmon Survey	L5	7.0 km	MPC · JPL
597381	2007 DU_{124}	—	February 25, 2007	Kitt Peak	Spacewatch	·	1.0 km	MPC · JPL
597382	2007 DY_{124}	—	February 26, 2007	Mount Lemmon	Mount Lemmon Survey	·	2.3 km	MPC · JPL
597383	2007 DE_{128}	—	February 25, 2007	Mount Lemmon	Mount Lemmon Survey	·	950 m	MPC · JPL
597384	2007 EU_{1}	—	February 25, 2007	Kitt Peak	Spacewatch	·	2.0 km	MPC · JPL
597385	2007 EF_{6}	—	March 9, 2007	Mount Lemmon	Mount Lemmon Survey	·	1.1 km	MPC · JPL
597386	2007 EQ_{19}	—	March 10, 2007	Mount Lemmon	Mount Lemmon Survey	·	1.1 km	MPC · JPL
597387	2007 EE_{22}	—	February 23, 2007	Mount Lemmon	Mount Lemmon Survey	EOS	2.0 km	MPC · JPL
597388	2007 EB_{23}	—	March 10, 2007	Mount Lemmon	Mount Lemmon Survey	·	1.0 km	MPC · JPL
597389	2007 EP_{25}	—	March 10, 2007	Mount Lemmon	Mount Lemmon Survey	·	3.0 km	MPC · JPL
597390	2007 EY_{34}	—	March 10, 2007	Kitt Peak	Spacewatch	EUN	1.0 km	MPC · JPL
597391	2007 ET_{35}	—	August 31, 2000	Kitt Peak	Spacewatch	·	1.2 km	MPC · JPL
597392	2007 EG_{56}	—	March 12, 2007	Kitt Peak	Spacewatch	·	2.2 km	MPC · JPL
597393	2007 EE_{58}	—	February 8, 2007	Mount Lemmon	Mount Lemmon Survey	·	2.3 km	MPC · JPL
597394	2007 EC_{66}	—	December 8, 2005	Kitt Peak	Spacewatch	·	1.5 km	MPC · JPL
597395	2007 EN_{70}	—	March 10, 2007	Kitt Peak	Spacewatch	·	860 m	MPC · JPL
597396	2007 ET_{75}	—	March 10, 2007	Kitt Peak	Spacewatch	·	3.3 km	MPC · JPL
597397	2007 EW_{80}	—	March 11, 2007	Kitt Peak	Spacewatch	·	2.0 km	MPC · JPL
597398	2007 EM_{85}	—	March 12, 2007	Mount Lemmon	Mount Lemmon Survey	·	2.3 km	MPC · JPL
597399	2007 EF_{90}	—	March 9, 2007	Mount Lemmon	Mount Lemmon Survey	·	1.3 km	MPC · JPL
597400	2007 EL_{90}	—	March 9, 2007	Mount Lemmon	Mount Lemmon Survey	·	2.1 km	MPC · JPL

== 597401–597500 ==
back to top

Designation			Discovery			Properties		Ref
Permanent	Provisional	Named after	Date	Site	Discoverer(s)	Category	Diam.	Ref
597401	2007 EU_{95}	—	March 10, 2007	Mount Lemmon	Mount Lemmon Survey	·	2.3 km	MPC · JPL
597402	2007 EU_{97}	—	March 11, 2007	Kitt Peak	Spacewatch	·	2.9 km	MPC · JPL
597403	2007 EL_{104}	—	February 25, 2007	Mount Lemmon	Mount Lemmon Survey	·	630 m	MPC · JPL
597404	2007 EY_{105}	—	March 11, 2007	Kitt Peak	Spacewatch	·	2.6 km	MPC · JPL
597405	2007 ED_{107}	—	March 11, 2007	Kitt Peak	Spacewatch	·	2.7 km	MPC · JPL
597406	2007 EF_{108}	—	March 11, 2007	Kitt Peak	Spacewatch	LIX	2.8 km	MPC · JPL
597407	2007 ER_{108}	—	March 11, 2007	Kitt Peak	Spacewatch	·	840 m	MPC · JPL
597408	2007 EM_{115}	—	September 26, 2003	Apache Point	SDSS Collaboration	·	3.3 km	MPC · JPL
597409	2007 EW_{115}	—	March 13, 2007	Mount Lemmon	Mount Lemmon Survey	·	1.3 km	MPC · JPL
597410	2007 EK_{123}	—	October 10, 2004	Kitt Peak	Spacewatch	·	2.9 km	MPC · JPL
597411	2007 EL_{125}	—	March 13, 2007	Mount Nyukasa	Japan Aerospace Exploration Agency	·	2.2 km	MPC · JPL
597412	2007 EG_{133}	—	March 9, 2007	Mount Lemmon	Mount Lemmon Survey	·	1.0 km	MPC · JPL
597413	2007 EA_{137}	—	January 28, 2007	Mount Lemmon	Mount Lemmon Survey	NYS	900 m	MPC · JPL
597414	2007 EZ_{142}	—	March 12, 2007	Kitt Peak	Spacewatch	·	1.2 km	MPC · JPL
597415	2007 EX_{144}	—	March 12, 2007	Mount Lemmon	Mount Lemmon Survey	THM	1.8 km	MPC · JPL
597416	2007 EV_{147}	—	March 12, 2007	Mount Lemmon	Mount Lemmon Survey	·	2.3 km	MPC · JPL
597417	2007 EA_{150}	—	March 12, 2007	Mount Lemmon	Mount Lemmon Survey	·	2.4 km	MPC · JPL
597418	2007 EZ_{159}	—	March 14, 2007	Mount Lemmon	Mount Lemmon Survey	TIR	2.0 km	MPC · JPL
597419	2007 EE_{160}	—	March 14, 2007	Kitt Peak	Spacewatch	EOS	1.4 km	MPC · JPL
597420	2007 EG_{163}	—	March 15, 2007	Mount Lemmon	Mount Lemmon Survey	NYS	530 m	MPC · JPL
597421	2007 EG_{168}	—	March 13, 2007	Kitt Peak	Spacewatch	·	3.1 km	MPC · JPL
597422	2007 EV_{170}	—	January 27, 2007	Mount Lemmon	Mount Lemmon Survey	·	1.0 km	MPC · JPL
597423	2007 ES_{173}	—	March 14, 2007	Kitt Peak	Spacewatch	·	2.9 km	MPC · JPL
597424	2007 EP_{174}	—	March 14, 2007	Kitt Peak	Spacewatch	V	550 m	MPC · JPL
597425	2007 EY_{179}	—	March 14, 2007	Mount Lemmon	Mount Lemmon Survey	·	1.6 km	MPC · JPL
597426	2007 EU_{188}	—	September 15, 2004	Kitt Peak	Spacewatch	·	2.2 km	MPC · JPL
597427	2007 EK_{194}	—	February 26, 2007	Mount Lemmon	Mount Lemmon Survey	(194)	1.4 km	MPC · JPL
597428	2007 EM_{194}	—	March 15, 2007	Kitt Peak	Spacewatch	·	800 m	MPC · JPL
597429	2007 ES_{203}	—	March 11, 2003	Palomar	NEAT	·	1.7 km	MPC · JPL
597430	2007 EZ_{222}	—	February 16, 2007	Palomar	NEAT	·	2.3 km	MPC · JPL
597431	2007 EB_{227}	—	March 13, 2007	Mount Lemmon	Mount Lemmon Survey	NEM	2.3 km	MPC · JPL
597432	2007 EW_{227}	—	March 15, 2007	Mount Lemmon	Mount Lemmon Survey	EUP	3.5 km	MPC · JPL
597433	2007 EO_{228}	—	November 12, 2010	Mount Lemmon	Mount Lemmon Survey	·	2.5 km	MPC · JPL
597434	2007 ET_{228}	—	January 2, 2012	Mount Lemmon	Mount Lemmon Survey	·	2.2 km	MPC · JPL
597435	2007 EY_{228}	—	March 14, 2007	Kitt Peak	Spacewatch	·	2.4 km	MPC · JPL
597436	2007 EV_{229}	—	August 3, 2014	Haleakala	Pan-STARRS 1	·	2.2 km	MPC · JPL
597437	2007 EL_{231}	—	November 11, 2010	Mount Lemmon	Mount Lemmon Survey	VER	2.6 km	MPC · JPL
597438	2007 EO_{231}	—	March 23, 2012	Mount Lemmon	Mount Lemmon Survey	EOS	1.4 km	MPC · JPL
597439	2007 EW_{231}	—	December 7, 2013	Haleakala	Pan-STARRS 1	·	1.2 km	MPC · JPL
597440	2007 EN_{232}	—	February 6, 2007	Mount Lemmon	Mount Lemmon Survey	EOS	1.7 km	MPC · JPL
597441	2007 EP_{232}	—	June 5, 2013	Mount Lemmon	Mount Lemmon Survey	·	2.6 km	MPC · JPL
597442	2007 EP_{234}	—	July 23, 2015	Haleakala	Pan-STARRS 1	·	2.4 km	MPC · JPL
597443	2007 EZ_{234}	—	March 19, 2013	Haleakala	Pan-STARRS 1	·	2.1 km	MPC · JPL
597444	2007 EN_{235}	—	March 29, 2015	Haleakala	Pan-STARRS 1	·	960 m	MPC · JPL
597445	2007 ED_{236}	—	September 27, 2009	Kitt Peak	Spacewatch	·	820 m	MPC · JPL
597446	2007 EE_{240}	—	March 13, 2007	Kitt Peak	Spacewatch	·	3.4 km	MPC · JPL
597447	2007 EN_{240}	—	March 12, 2007	Mount Lemmon	Mount Lemmon Survey	·	790 m	MPC · JPL
597448	2007 ED_{241}	—	March 10, 2007	Kitt Peak	Spacewatch	·	2.2 km	MPC · JPL
597449	2007 EU_{241}	—	March 11, 2007	Mount Lemmon	Mount Lemmon Survey	·	480 m	MPC · JPL
597450	2007 FS_{9}	—	March 16, 2007	Kitt Peak	Spacewatch	·	1.4 km	MPC · JPL
597451	2007 FJ_{13}	—	February 27, 2007	Kitt Peak	Spacewatch	·	2.9 km	MPC · JPL
597452	2007 FB_{19}	—	March 10, 2007	Mount Lemmon	Mount Lemmon Survey	·	940 m	MPC · JPL
597453	2007 FV_{26}	—	March 20, 2007	Kitt Peak	Spacewatch	·	2.8 km	MPC · JPL
597454	2007 FS_{30}	—	March 20, 2007	Mount Lemmon	Mount Lemmon Survey	·	1.6 km	MPC · JPL
597455	2007 FB_{52}	—	March 18, 2007	Kitt Peak	Spacewatch	·	2.6 km	MPC · JPL
597456	2007 FW_{53}	—	March 26, 2007	Kitt Peak	Spacewatch	·	1.3 km	MPC · JPL
597457	2007 FW_{55}	—	January 2, 2012	Mount Lemmon	Mount Lemmon Survey	EOS	1.8 km	MPC · JPL
597458	2007 FU_{57}	—	April 10, 2013	Haleakala	Pan-STARRS 1	·	2.2 km	MPC · JPL
597459	2007 FZ_{59}	—	March 26, 2007	Mount Lemmon	Mount Lemmon Survey	·	730 m	MPC · JPL
597460	2007 FQ_{61}	—	March 26, 2007	Mount Lemmon	Mount Lemmon Survey	·	2.2 km	MPC · JPL
597461	2007 FS_{61}	—	March 25, 2007	Mount Lemmon	Mount Lemmon Survey	·	2.6 km	MPC · JPL
597462	2007 GZ	—	April 8, 2007	Altschwendt	W. Ries	·	2.9 km	MPC · JPL
597463	2007 GA_{8}	—	March 23, 2003	Kitt Peak	Spacewatch	·	1.0 km	MPC · JPL
597464	2007 GW_{10}	—	March 11, 2007	Kitt Peak	Spacewatch	·	2.6 km	MPC · JPL
597465	2007 GW_{13}	—	November 29, 2005	Kitt Peak	Spacewatch	·	1.4 km	MPC · JPL
597466	2007 GU_{27}	—	March 31, 2007	Palomar	NEAT	·	2.0 km	MPC · JPL
597467	2007 GL_{33}	—	April 11, 2007	Mount Lemmon	Mount Lemmon Survey	·	470 m	MPC · JPL
597468	2007 GU_{52}	—	April 14, 2007	Kitt Peak	Spacewatch	EUN	840 m	MPC · JPL
597469 Denisleahy	2007 GV_{71}	Denisleahy	April 7, 2007	Mauna Kea	D. D. Balam, K. M. Perrett	EOS	1.5 km	MPC · JPL
597470 Lauraparker	2007 GG_{72}	Lauraparker	April 15, 2007	Mauna Kea	D. D. Balam, K. M. Perrett	·	2.2 km	MPC · JPL
597471	2007 GS_{72}	—	April 15, 2007	Kitt Peak	Spacewatch	·	1.6 km	MPC · JPL
597472	2007 GC_{77}	—	March 26, 2007	Catalina	CSS	·	2.7 km	MPC · JPL
597473	2007 GE_{78}	—	November 2, 2010	Mount Lemmon	Mount Lemmon Survey	·	2.6 km	MPC · JPL
597474	2007 GZ_{78}	—	February 22, 2007	Kitt Peak	Spacewatch	·	2.7 km	MPC · JPL
597475	2007 GW_{79}	—	July 27, 2014	Haleakala	Pan-STARRS 1	·	2.7 km	MPC · JPL
597476	2007 GL_{81}	—	October 27, 1998	Kitt Peak	Spacewatch	·	2.6 km	MPC · JPL
597477	2007 HJ	—	April 16, 2007	Bergisch Gladbach	W. Bickel	H	590 m	MPC · JPL
597478	2007 HS	—	April 18, 2007	7300	W. K. Y. Yeung	·	990 m	MPC · JPL
597479	2007 HM_{4}	—	April 18, 2007	Desert Moon	Stevens, B. L.	·	1.3 km	MPC · JPL
597480	2007 HB_{20}	—	April 18, 2007	Kitt Peak	Spacewatch	·	1.1 km	MPC · JPL
597481	2007 HC_{26}	—	April 18, 2007	Kitt Peak	Spacewatch	·	780 m	MPC · JPL
597482	2007 HQ_{29}	—	March 14, 2007	Kitt Peak	Spacewatch	·	1.1 km	MPC · JPL
597483	2007 HE_{31}	—	April 19, 2007	Mount Lemmon	Mount Lemmon Survey	·	1.4 km	MPC · JPL
597484	2007 HH_{43}	—	April 22, 2007	Mount Lemmon	Mount Lemmon Survey	·	1.2 km	MPC · JPL
597485	2007 HA_{44}	—	May 12, 1996	Kitt Peak	Spacewatch	EOS	2.0 km	MPC · JPL
597486	2007 HX_{47}	—	April 20, 2007	Kitt Peak	Spacewatch	·	500 m	MPC · JPL
597487	2007 HR_{55}	—	April 22, 2007	Kitt Peak	Spacewatch	·	2.4 km	MPC · JPL
597488	2007 HM_{56}	—	April 22, 2007	Kitt Peak	Spacewatch	·	490 m	MPC · JPL
597489	2007 HV_{60}	—	April 20, 2007	Kitt Peak	Spacewatch	·	1.0 km	MPC · JPL
597490	2007 HE_{63}	—	April 22, 2007	Mount Lemmon	Mount Lemmon Survey	·	480 m	MPC · JPL
597491	2007 HX_{65}	—	April 22, 2007	Mount Lemmon	Mount Lemmon Survey	VER	2.3 km	MPC · JPL
597492	2007 HU_{71}	—	April 22, 2007	Kitt Peak	Spacewatch	·	930 m	MPC · JPL
597493	2007 HD_{78}	—	August 27, 2000	Cerro Tololo	Deep Ecliptic Survey	·	1.0 km	MPC · JPL
597494	2007 HO_{78}	—	March 25, 2007	Mount Lemmon	Mount Lemmon Survey	·	2.6 km	MPC · JPL
597495	2007 HM_{86}	—	April 20, 2007	Kitt Peak	Spacewatch	·	1.5 km	MPC · JPL
597496	2007 HT_{88}	—	April 22, 2007	Kitt Peak	Spacewatch	·	590 m	MPC · JPL
597497	2007 HM_{97}	—	April 23, 2007	Catalina	CSS	EUP	3.4 km	MPC · JPL
597498	2007 HX_{99}	—	April 19, 2007	Mount Lemmon	Mount Lemmon Survey	·	3.1 km	MPC · JPL
597499	2007 HB_{101}	—	April 26, 2007	Mount Lemmon	Mount Lemmon Survey	THB	2.4 km	MPC · JPL
597500	2007 HO_{101}	—	August 30, 2014	Haleakala	Pan-STARRS 1	·	1.0 km	MPC · JPL

== 597501–597600 ==
back to top

Designation			Discovery			Properties		Ref
Permanent	Provisional	Named after	Date	Site	Discoverer(s)	Category	Diam.	Ref
597501	2007 HG_{103}	—	February 19, 2007	Mount Lemmon	Mount Lemmon Survey	LIX	2.4 km	MPC · JPL
597502	2007 HM_{104}	—	April 18, 2007	Kitt Peak	Spacewatch	·	1.1 km	MPC · JPL
597503	2007 HP_{105}	—	October 16, 2009	Mount Lemmon	Mount Lemmon Survey	·	770 m	MPC · JPL
597504	2007 HQ_{105}	—	April 20, 2013	Kitt Peak	Spacewatch	·	2.9 km	MPC · JPL
597505	2007 HO_{106}	—	March 17, 2018	Haleakala	Pan-STARRS 1	·	2.6 km	MPC · JPL
597506	2007 HO_{108}	—	September 20, 2014	Haleakala	Pan-STARRS 1	EOS	1.4 km	MPC · JPL
597507	2007 HM_{111}	—	April 23, 2007	Kitt Peak	Spacewatch	·	1.4 km	MPC · JPL
597508	2007 HQ_{111}	—	April 26, 2007	Kitt Peak	Spacewatch	·	480 m	MPC · JPL
597509	2007 HY_{111}	—	April 20, 2007	Kitt Peak	Spacewatch	·	1.0 km	MPC · JPL
597510	2007 HB_{113}	—	April 22, 2007	Mount Lemmon	Mount Lemmon Survey	·	2.4 km	MPC · JPL
597511	2007 HY_{113}	—	April 18, 2007	Mount Lemmon	Mount Lemmon Survey	·	710 m	MPC · JPL
597512	2007 JU_{20}	—	April 19, 2007	Kitt Peak	Spacewatch	·	1.5 km	MPC · JPL
597513	2007 JP_{28}	—	May 10, 2007	Mount Lemmon	Mount Lemmon Survey	·	750 m	MPC · JPL
597514	2007 JJ_{36}	—	May 14, 2007	Siding Spring	SSS	T_{j} (2.98)	2.7 km	MPC · JPL
597515	2007 JA_{37}	—	May 9, 2007	Mount Lemmon	Mount Lemmon Survey	·	2.5 km	MPC · JPL
597516	2007 JU_{38}	—	April 19, 2007	Mount Lemmon	Mount Lemmon Survey	·	1.0 km	MPC · JPL
597517	2007 JV_{43}	—	May 15, 2007	Mount Lemmon	Mount Lemmon Survey	H	470 m	MPC · JPL
597518	2007 JV_{46}	—	May 9, 2007	Mount Lemmon	Mount Lemmon Survey	BAR	1.2 km	MPC · JPL
597519	2007 JD_{47}	—	May 12, 2007	Mount Lemmon	Mount Lemmon Survey	·	690 m	MPC · JPL
597520	2007 JJ_{47}	—	September 18, 2009	Mount Lemmon	Mount Lemmon Survey	·	2.4 km	MPC · JPL
597521	2007 JR_{47}	—	April 3, 2011	Haleakala	Pan-STARRS 1	·	1.2 km	MPC · JPL
597522	2007 JA_{49}	—	November 27, 2013	Haleakala	Pan-STARRS 1	·	1.1 km	MPC · JPL
597523	2007 KN	—	February 26, 2007	Mount Lemmon	Mount Lemmon Survey	·	930 m	MPC · JPL
597524	2007 KT	—	May 16, 2007	Mount Lemmon	Mount Lemmon Survey	·	570 m	MPC · JPL
597525	2007 KY_{9}	—	September 16, 2012	Kitt Peak	Spacewatch	L5	7.7 km	MPC · JPL
597526	2007 KF_{10}	—	February 20, 2015	Haleakala	Pan-STARRS 1	·	1.3 km	MPC · JPL
597527	2007 LM	—	June 7, 2007	Piszkéstető	K. Sárneczky	·	1.1 km	MPC · JPL
597528	2007 LD_{8}	—	June 9, 2007	Kitt Peak	Spacewatch	·	2.8 km	MPC · JPL
597529	2007 LL_{13}	—	June 10, 2007	Kitt Peak	Spacewatch	MAR	770 m	MPC · JPL
597530	2007 LK_{15}	—	April 25, 2007	Kitt Peak	Spacewatch	·	1.1 km	MPC · JPL
597531	2007 LX_{23}	—	June 14, 2007	Kitt Peak	Spacewatch	·	1.3 km	MPC · JPL
597532	2007 LA_{27}	—	June 15, 2007	Kitt Peak	Spacewatch	·	1.2 km	MPC · JPL
597533	2007 LB_{34}	—	April 25, 2007	Mount Lemmon	Mount Lemmon Survey	T_{j} (2.98)	2.9 km	MPC · JPL
597534	2007 LG_{39}	—	January 20, 2015	Haleakala	Pan-STARRS 1	·	1.0 km	MPC · JPL
597535	2007 LN_{39}	—	February 18, 2015	Haleakala	Pan-STARRS 1	MAR	790 m	MPC · JPL
597536	2007 LO_{39}	—	April 25, 2015	Haleakala	Pan-STARRS 1	·	890 m	MPC · JPL
597537	2007 MF_{10}	—	June 21, 2007	Mount Lemmon	Mount Lemmon Survey	EUN	1.2 km	MPC · JPL
597538	2007 MZ_{12}	—	June 21, 2007	Mount Lemmon	Mount Lemmon Survey	MAR	1.1 km	MPC · JPL
597539	2007 MS_{16}	—	June 15, 2007	Kitt Peak	Spacewatch	·	650 m	MPC · JPL
597540	2007 MR_{19}	—	April 24, 2006	Bergisch Gladbach	W. Bickel	·	1.6 km	MPC · JPL
597541	2007 MY_{24}	—	June 23, 2007	Kitt Peak	Spacewatch	·	590 m	MPC · JPL
597542	2007 MV_{27}	—	November 21, 2008	Mount Lemmon	Mount Lemmon Survey	·	660 m	MPC · JPL
597543	2007 MN_{28}	—	November 3, 2016	Haleakala	Pan-STARRS 1	·	3.6 km	MPC · JPL
597544	2007 MA_{29}	—	November 4, 2016	Haleakala	Pan-STARRS 1	·	830 m	MPC · JPL
597545	2007 MD_{29}	—	June 20, 2007	Kitt Peak	Spacewatch	·	960 m	MPC · JPL
597546	2007 NB	—	July 6, 2007	Pla D'Arguines	R. Ferrando, Ferrando, M.	·	1.3 km	MPC · JPL
597547	2007 OE_{2}	—	July 16, 2007	Socorro	LINEAR	·	750 m	MPC · JPL
597548	2007 OL_{2}	—	July 19, 2007	Cordell-Lorenz	D. T. Durig, Hardage, D. S.	·	1.6 km	MPC · JPL
597549	2007 OD_{4}	—	July 21, 2007	Charleston	R. Holmes	PHO	820 m	MPC · JPL
597550	2007 OT_{8}	—	July 24, 2007	Mauna Kea	D. D. Balam, K. M. Perrett	·	2.5 km	MPC · JPL
597551	2007 OF_{11}	—	August 25, 2003	Cerro Tololo	Deep Ecliptic Survey	·	1.1 km	MPC · JPL
597552	2007 OE_{12}	—	July 18, 2007	Mount Lemmon	Mount Lemmon Survey	·	1.1 km	MPC · JPL
597553	2007 PF_{27}	—	August 11, 2007	Palomar	M. E. Schwamb	BRG	1.1 km	MPC · JPL
597554	2007 PX_{48}	—	August 13, 2007	XuYi	PMO NEO Survey Program	·	530 m	MPC · JPL
597555	2007 PK_{51}	—	August 8, 2007	Vail-Jarnac	Jarnac	·	780 m	MPC · JPL
597556	2007 PY_{51}	—	August 10, 2007	Kitt Peak	Spacewatch	·	530 m	MPC · JPL
597557	2007 QA_{12}	—	September 8, 2007	Anderson Mesa	LONEOS	·	530 m	MPC · JPL
597558	2007 QF_{18}	—	August 23, 2007	Kitt Peak	Spacewatch	·	1.7 km	MPC · JPL
597559	2007 QG_{18}	—	August 23, 2007	Kitt Peak	Spacewatch	·	1.9 km	MPC · JPL
597560	2007 QH_{18}	—	September 25, 2014	Kitt Peak	Spacewatch	·	680 m	MPC · JPL
597561	2007 RG_{5}	—	September 2, 2007	Siding Spring	K. Sárneczky, L. Kiss	L4	6.1 km	MPC · JPL
597562	2007 RK_{12}	—	September 11, 2007	Mount Lemmon	Mount Lemmon Survey	H	610 m	MPC · JPL
597563	2007 RR_{15}	—	September 11, 2007	Palomar	M. E. Schwamb	(2076)	770 m	MPC · JPL
597564	2007 RH_{17}	—	September 12, 2007	Saint-Sulpice	B. Christophe	·	500 m	MPC · JPL
597565	2007 RS_{33}	—	September 5, 2007	Catalina	CSS	·	1.7 km	MPC · JPL
597566	2007 RP_{54}	—	September 9, 2007	Kitt Peak	Spacewatch	NEM	1.7 km	MPC · JPL
597567	2007 RD_{61}	—	September 10, 2007	Mount Lemmon	Mount Lemmon Survey	·	3.1 km	MPC · JPL
597568	2007 RC_{66}	—	September 10, 2007	Mount Lemmon	Mount Lemmon Survey	·	2.9 km	MPC · JPL
597569	2007 RB_{75}	—	September 10, 2007	Mount Lemmon	Mount Lemmon Survey	·	1.4 km	MPC · JPL
597570	2007 RD_{76}	—	March 4, 2005	Kitt Peak	Spacewatch	·	1.6 km	MPC · JPL
597571	2007 RB_{94}	—	September 10, 2007	Kitt Peak	Spacewatch	·	490 m	MPC · JPL
597572	2007 RX_{107}	—	April 1, 2003	Palomar	NEAT	·	690 m	MPC · JPL
597573	2007 RY_{112}	—	September 11, 2007	Kitt Peak	Spacewatch	·	1.1 km	MPC · JPL
597574	2007 RL_{128}	—	September 12, 2007	Mount Lemmon	Mount Lemmon Survey	GEF	1.0 km	MPC · JPL
597575	2007 RZ_{157}	—	March 3, 2006	Catalina	CSS	·	1.8 km	MPC · JPL
597576	2007 RL_{163}	—	August 24, 2007	Kitt Peak	Spacewatch	·	520 m	MPC · JPL
597577	2007 RB_{170}	—	October 17, 2003	Kitt Peak	Spacewatch	·	1.6 km	MPC · JPL
597578	2007 RP_{181}	—	September 11, 2007	Mount Lemmon	Mount Lemmon Survey	AGN	970 m	MPC · JPL
597579	2007 RR_{182}	—	September 12, 2007	Mount Lemmon	Mount Lemmon Survey	·	600 m	MPC · JPL
597580	2007 RN_{187}	—	September 13, 2007	Mount Lemmon	Mount Lemmon Survey	(12739)	1.7 km	MPC · JPL
597581	2007 RL_{191}	—	September 11, 2007	Kitt Peak	Spacewatch	·	1.6 km	MPC · JPL
597582	2007 RV_{191}	—	September 11, 2007	Kitt Peak	Spacewatch	·	1.4 km	MPC · JPL
597583	2007 RZ_{196}	—	September 13, 2007	Mount Lemmon	Mount Lemmon Survey	·	460 m	MPC · JPL
597584	2007 RD_{197}	—	September 13, 2007	Mount Lemmon	Mount Lemmon Survey	·	1.3 km	MPC · JPL
597585	2007 RB_{207}	—	September 10, 2007	Kitt Peak	Spacewatch	·	1.9 km	MPC · JPL
597586	2007 RP_{208}	—	September 10, 2007	Kitt Peak	Spacewatch	·	1.6 km	MPC · JPL
597587	2007 RP_{211}	—	November 20, 2003	Apache Point	SDSS	·	2.5 km	MPC · JPL
597588	2007 RV_{211}	—	September 11, 2007	Kitt Peak	Spacewatch	·	1.9 km	MPC · JPL
597589	2007 RZ_{211}	—	September 11, 2007	Kitt Peak	Spacewatch	·	740 m	MPC · JPL
597590	2007 RT_{214}	—	September 12, 2007	Kitt Peak	Spacewatch	·	1.3 km	MPC · JPL
597591	2007 RF_{219}	—	September 14, 2007	Mount Lemmon	Mount Lemmon Survey	·	1.4 km	MPC · JPL
597592	2007 RU_{219}	—	September 14, 2007	Mount Lemmon	Mount Lemmon Survey	·	1.4 km	MPC · JPL
597593	2007 RV_{220}	—	September 14, 2007	Mount Lemmon	Mount Lemmon Survey	·	1.4 km	MPC · JPL
597594	2007 RM_{221}	—	September 14, 2007	Mount Lemmon	Mount Lemmon Survey	·	1.7 km	MPC · JPL
597595	2007 RF_{222}	—	September 14, 2007	Mount Lemmon	Mount Lemmon Survey	EUN	990 m	MPC · JPL
597596	2007 RH_{233}	—	September 12, 2007	Catalina	CSS	·	810 m	MPC · JPL
597597	2007 RB_{241}	—	September 10, 2007	Catalina	CSS	·	2.2 km	MPC · JPL
597598	2007 RC_{251}	—	September 13, 2007	Kitt Peak	Spacewatch	·	580 m	MPC · JPL
597599	2007 RD_{254}	—	March 2, 2006	Mount Lemmon	Mount Lemmon Survey	·	1.8 km	MPC · JPL
597600	2007 RN_{258}	—	September 14, 2007	Kitt Peak	Spacewatch	·	510 m	MPC · JPL

== 597601–597700 ==
back to top

Designation			Discovery			Properties		Ref
Permanent	Provisional	Named after	Date	Site	Discoverer(s)	Category	Diam.	Ref
597601	2007 RK_{259}	—	September 14, 2007	Mount Lemmon	Mount Lemmon Survey	AGN	910 m	MPC · JPL
597602	2007 RE_{261}	—	May 2, 2003	Kitt Peak	Spacewatch	·	690 m	MPC · JPL
597603	2007 RJ_{261}	—	September 14, 2007	Kitt Peak	Spacewatch	·	670 m	MPC · JPL
597604	2007 RT_{261}	—	September 14, 2007	Kitt Peak	Spacewatch	·	1.6 km	MPC · JPL
597605	2007 RM_{263}	—	September 15, 2007	Mount Lemmon	Mount Lemmon Survey	(5)	1.3 km	MPC · JPL
597606	2007 RO_{263}	—	July 19, 2007	Mount Lemmon	Mount Lemmon Survey	·	3.6 km	MPC · JPL
597607	2007 RD_{268}	—	September 15, 2007	Kitt Peak	Spacewatch	·	1.6 km	MPC · JPL
597608	2007 RJ_{280}	—	September 13, 2007	Catalina	CSS	·	1.3 km	MPC · JPL
597609	2007 RC_{281}	—	September 13, 2007	Catalina	CSS	·	1.7 km	MPC · JPL
597610	2007 RH_{282}	—	September 13, 2007	Kitt Peak	Spacewatch	·	970 m	MPC · JPL
597611	2007 RQ_{297}	—	September 2, 2007	Mount Lemmon	Mount Lemmon Survey	EUN	1.2 km	MPC · JPL
597612	2007 RQ_{308}	—	September 14, 2007	Kitt Peak	Spacewatch	L4	6.0 km	MPC · JPL
597613	2007 RO_{313}	—	September 9, 2007	Kitt Peak	Spacewatch	·	910 m	MPC · JPL
597614	2007 RM_{314}	—	September 14, 2007	Mauna Kea	P. A. Wiegert, A. Papadimos	SDO	194 km	MPC · JPL
597615	2007 RZ_{314}	—	September 5, 2007	Lulin	LUSS	·	1.8 km	MPC · JPL
597616	2007 RN_{327}	—	September 14, 2007	Mount Lemmon	Mount Lemmon Survey	·	590 m	MPC · JPL
597617	2007 RS_{328}	—	September 15, 2007	Kitt Peak	Spacewatch	·	1.2 km	MPC · JPL
597618	2007 RQ_{329}	—	September 4, 2007	Mount Lemmon	Mount Lemmon Survey	·	1.5 km	MPC · JPL
597619	2007 RO_{330}	—	September 12, 2007	Catalina	CSS	·	680 m	MPC · JPL
597620	2007 RB_{331}	—	September 12, 2007	Mount Lemmon	Mount Lemmon Survey	·	1.6 km	MPC · JPL
597621	2007 RL_{331}	—	September 13, 2007	Mount Lemmon	Mount Lemmon Survey	·	530 m	MPC · JPL
597622	2007 RX_{333}	—	February 15, 2010	Kitt Peak	Spacewatch	·	1.4 km	MPC · JPL
597623	2007 RD_{334}	—	September 10, 2007	Kitt Peak	Spacewatch	NYS	990 m	MPC · JPL
597624	2007 RF_{334}	—	January 20, 2009	Mount Lemmon	Mount Lemmon Survey	·	1.3 km	MPC · JPL
597625	2007 RZ_{336}	—	October 1, 2016	Mount Lemmon	Mount Lemmon Survey	EUN	920 m	MPC · JPL
597626	2007 RL_{337}	—	May 1, 2011	Haleakala	Pan-STARRS 1	·	1.0 km	MPC · JPL
597627	2007 RA_{339}	—	August 30, 1998	Kitt Peak	Spacewatch	·	1.7 km	MPC · JPL
597628	2007 RR_{339}	—	September 14, 2007	Catalina	CSS	EUN	1.1 km	MPC · JPL
597629	2007 RR_{344}	—	June 18, 2018	Haleakala	Pan-STARRS 1	L4	6.4 km	MPC · JPL
597630	2007 RW_{346}	—	September 29, 2009	Mount Lemmon	Mount Lemmon Survey	L4	7.1 km	MPC · JPL
597631	2007 RP_{348}	—	September 10, 2007	Mount Lemmon	Mount Lemmon Survey	L4	6.3 km	MPC · JPL
597632	2007 RW_{349}	—	June 13, 2015	Haleakala	Pan-STARRS 1	NEM	1.6 km	MPC · JPL
597633	2007 RO_{354}	—	September 10, 2007	Mount Lemmon	Mount Lemmon Survey	AST	1.6 km	MPC · JPL
597634	2007 RG_{358}	—	September 11, 2007	Kitt Peak	Spacewatch	·	1.3 km	MPC · JPL
597635	2007 RC_{359}	—	September 10, 2007	Kitt Peak	Spacewatch	·	1.2 km	MPC · JPL
597636	2007 RT_{359}	—	September 10, 2007	Mount Lemmon	Mount Lemmon Survey	·	1.4 km	MPC · JPL
597637	2007 RE_{361}	—	August 2, 2000	Kitt Peak	Spacewatch	·	640 m	MPC · JPL
597638	2007 RT_{361}	—	September 14, 2007	Mount Lemmon	Mount Lemmon Survey	HOF	2.0 km	MPC · JPL
597639	2007 RN_{364}	—	September 12, 2007	Mount Lemmon	Mount Lemmon Survey	·	1.7 km	MPC · JPL
597640	2007 RU_{366}	—	September 10, 2007	Mount Lemmon	Mount Lemmon Survey	L4 · ERY	5.5 km	MPC · JPL
597641	2007 RG_{367}	—	September 13, 2007	Mount Lemmon	Mount Lemmon Survey	·	1.1 km	MPC · JPL
597642	2007 RD_{368}	—	September 15, 2007	Mount Lemmon	Mount Lemmon Survey	EOS	1.6 km	MPC · JPL
597643	2007 RG_{369}	—	September 15, 2007	Kitt Peak	Spacewatch	·	790 m	MPC · JPL
597644	2007 RL_{370}	—	September 4, 2007	Mount Lemmon	Mount Lemmon Survey	KOR	1.1 km	MPC · JPL
597645	2007 RM_{370}	—	September 12, 2007	Mount Lemmon	Mount Lemmon Survey	·	1.5 km	MPC · JPL
597646	2007 RW_{370}	—	September 11, 2007	Mount Lemmon	Mount Lemmon Survey	EOS	1.4 km	MPC · JPL
597647	2007 RQ_{372}	—	September 10, 2007	Mount Lemmon	Mount Lemmon Survey	HOF	2.0 km	MPC · JPL
597648	2007 ST_{1}	—	September 19, 2007	Junk Bond	D. Healy	·	1.2 km	MPC · JPL
597649	2007 SO_{8}	—	September 10, 2007	Kitt Peak	Spacewatch	·	2.0 km	MPC · JPL
597650	2007 SR_{10}	—	September 20, 2007	Mount Lemmon	Mount Lemmon Survey	·	2.1 km	MPC · JPL
597651	2007 SD_{19}	—	September 26, 2007	Mount Lemmon	Mount Lemmon Survey	·	1.6 km	MPC · JPL
597652	2007 TB_{13}	—	October 4, 2007	Kitt Peak	Spacewatch	·	1.7 km	MPC · JPL
597653	2007 TP_{20}	—	January 17, 2004	Palomar	NEAT	·	1.5 km	MPC · JPL
597654	2007 TY_{29}	—	October 4, 2007	Kitt Peak	Spacewatch	·	1.7 km	MPC · JPL
597655	2007 TU_{34}	—	September 9, 2007	Mount Lemmon	Mount Lemmon Survey	·	720 m	MPC · JPL
597656	2007 TZ_{37}	—	September 13, 2007	Kitt Peak	Spacewatch	·	2.0 km	MPC · JPL
597657	2007 TC_{46}	—	October 7, 2007	Kitt Peak	Spacewatch	·	2.7 km	MPC · JPL
597658	2007 TB_{48}	—	October 4, 2007	Kitt Peak	Spacewatch	·	1.9 km	MPC · JPL
597659	2007 TG_{57}	—	October 4, 2007	Kitt Peak	Spacewatch	·	620 m	MPC · JPL
597660	2007 TH_{59}	—	September 14, 2007	Anderson Mesa	LONEOS	·	480 m	MPC · JPL
597661	2007 TY_{68}	—	October 13, 2007	Socorro	LINEAR	·	1.2 km	MPC · JPL
597662	2007 TB_{73}	—	October 14, 2007	Altschwendt	W. Ries	·	1.4 km	MPC · JPL
597663	2007 TX_{74}	—	September 8, 2007	Mount Lemmon	Mount Lemmon Survey	·	2.7 km	MPC · JPL
597664	2007 TN_{75}	—	September 18, 2007	Kitt Peak	Spacewatch	·	1.4 km	MPC · JPL
597665	2007 TU_{87}	—	October 8, 2007	Mount Lemmon	Mount Lemmon Survey	·	1.1 km	MPC · JPL
597666	2007 TY_{105}	—	October 15, 2007	Altschwendt	W. Ries	·	930 m	MPC · JPL
597667	2007 TQ_{165}	—	September 20, 2007	Catalina	CSS	·	620 m	MPC · JPL
597668	2007 TR_{166}	—	September 11, 2007	Catalina	CSS	·	1.6 km	MPC · JPL
597669	2007 TV_{167}	—	October 8, 2007	Črni Vrh	Matičič, S.	·	1.8 km	MPC · JPL
597670	2007 TB_{179}	—	October 7, 2007	Catalina	CSS	·	910 m	MPC · JPL
597671	2007 TK_{179}	—	October 7, 2007	Mount Lemmon	Mount Lemmon Survey	·	670 m	MPC · JPL
597672	2007 TH_{188}	—	September 9, 2007	Kitt Peak	Spacewatch	·	500 m	MPC · JPL
597673	2007 TD_{192}	—	October 5, 2007	Kitt Peak	Spacewatch	·	690 m	MPC · JPL
597674	2007 TY_{194}	—	September 15, 2007	Mount Lemmon	Mount Lemmon Survey	·	1.9 km	MPC · JPL
597675	2007 TQ_{196}	—	October 7, 2007	Mount Lemmon	Mount Lemmon Survey	·	1.3 km	MPC · JPL
597676	2007 TF_{201}	—	October 8, 2007	Kitt Peak	Spacewatch	MRX	1.0 km	MPC · JPL
597677	2007 TX_{205}	—	October 9, 2007	Mount Lemmon	Mount Lemmon Survey	THM	2.1 km	MPC · JPL
597678	2007 TG_{206}	—	October 11, 2007	Mount Lemmon	Mount Lemmon Survey	·	560 m	MPC · JPL
597679	2007 TB_{211}	—	September 7, 2000	Kitt Peak	Spacewatch	·	730 m	MPC · JPL
597680	2007 TH_{211}	—	December 18, 2004	Mount Lemmon	Mount Lemmon Survey	·	570 m	MPC · JPL
597681	2007 TU_{227}	—	October 8, 2007	Kitt Peak	Spacewatch	·	1.5 km	MPC · JPL
597682	2007 TV_{236}	—	April 2, 2005	Kitt Peak	Spacewatch	·	1.8 km	MPC · JPL
597683	2007 TZ_{242}	—	October 8, 2007	Catalina	CSS	·	1.8 km	MPC · JPL
597684	2007 TJ_{246}	—	October 9, 2007	Anderson Mesa	LONEOS	(883)	770 m	MPC · JPL
597685	2007 TS_{255}	—	October 10, 2007	Kitt Peak	Spacewatch	·	650 m	MPC · JPL
597686	2007 TW_{264}	—	October 11, 2007	Kitt Peak	Spacewatch	·	700 m	MPC · JPL
597687	2007 TG_{282}	—	October 8, 2007	Mount Lemmon	Mount Lemmon Survey	·	1.1 km	MPC · JPL
597688	2007 TN_{290}	—	September 14, 2007	Catalina	CSS	·	2.7 km	MPC · JPL
597689	2007 TK_{300}	—	October 12, 2007	Kitt Peak	Spacewatch	·	1.3 km	MPC · JPL
597690	2007 TS_{300}	—	October 4, 2007	Kitt Peak	Spacewatch	BRA	1.3 km	MPC · JPL
597691	2007 TS_{302}	—	October 12, 2007	Kitt Peak	Spacewatch	·	1.7 km	MPC · JPL
597692	2007 TC_{308}	—	October 9, 2007	Mount Lemmon	Mount Lemmon Survey	·	470 m	MPC · JPL
597693	2007 TR_{313}	—	October 11, 2007	Mount Lemmon	Mount Lemmon Survey	·	1.4 km	MPC · JPL
597694	2007 TD_{316}	—	October 12, 2007	Kitt Peak	Spacewatch	·	1.5 km	MPC · JPL
597695	2007 TS_{323}	—	October 11, 2007	Kitt Peak	Spacewatch	·	1.6 km	MPC · JPL
597696	2007 TP_{339}	—	September 10, 2007	Mount Lemmon	Mount Lemmon Survey	·	600 m	MPC · JPL
597697	2007 TF_{342}	—	October 9, 2007	Mount Lemmon	Mount Lemmon Survey	NYS	760 m	MPC · JPL
597698	2007 TT_{342}	—	October 10, 2007	Mount Lemmon	Mount Lemmon Survey	·	560 m	MPC · JPL
597699	2007 TB_{346}	—	September 18, 2007	Kitt Peak	Spacewatch	·	1.4 km	MPC · JPL
597700	2007 TJ_{355}	—	October 11, 2007	Catalina	CSS	·	910 m	MPC · JPL

== 597701–597800 ==
back to top

Designation			Discovery			Properties		Ref
Permanent	Provisional	Named after	Date	Site	Discoverer(s)	Category	Diam.	Ref
597701	2007 TG_{358}	—	October 15, 2007	Mount Lemmon	Mount Lemmon Survey	·	1.7 km	MPC · JPL
597702	2007 TZ_{359}	—	October 15, 2007	Mount Lemmon	Mount Lemmon Survey	·	1.9 km	MPC · JPL
597703	2007 TH_{371}	—	October 12, 2007	Mount Lemmon	Mount Lemmon Survey	·	1.8 km	MPC · JPL
597704	2007 TC_{372}	—	September 12, 2007	Mount Lemmon	Mount Lemmon Survey	·	1.3 km	MPC · JPL
597705	2007 TQ_{375}	—	October 15, 2007	Mount Lemmon	Mount Lemmon Survey	·	2.1 km	MPC · JPL
597706	2007 TU_{391}	—	October 8, 2007	Mount Lemmon	Mount Lemmon Survey	JUN	820 m	MPC · JPL
597707	2007 TH_{396}	—	October 15, 2007	Kitt Peak	Spacewatch	·	720 m	MPC · JPL
597708	2007 TU_{398}	—	October 15, 2007	Kitt Peak	Spacewatch	·	1.2 km	MPC · JPL
597709	2007 TK_{399}	—	October 11, 2007	Kitt Peak	Spacewatch	·	2.3 km	MPC · JPL
597710	2007 TW_{407}	—	October 15, 2007	Mount Lemmon	Mount Lemmon Survey	·	1.8 km	MPC · JPL
597711	2007 TH_{408}	—	October 15, 2007	Mount Lemmon	Mount Lemmon Survey	HOF	2.0 km	MPC · JPL
597712	2007 TQ_{408}	—	October 14, 2007	Kitt Peak	Spacewatch	AGN	950 m	MPC · JPL
597713	2007 TU_{424}	—	October 8, 2007	Kitt Peak	Spacewatch	·	1.8 km	MPC · JPL
597714	2007 TD_{427}	—	October 10, 2007	Kitt Peak	Spacewatch	AGN	960 m	MPC · JPL
597715	2007 TK_{429}	—	October 12, 2007	Mount Lemmon	Mount Lemmon Survey	·	1.8 km	MPC · JPL
597716	2007 TO_{437}	—	September 10, 2007	Mount Lemmon	Mount Lemmon Survey	·	1.3 km	MPC · JPL
597717	2007 TS_{439}	—	October 8, 2007	Mount Lemmon	Mount Lemmon Survey	·	1.1 km	MPC · JPL
597718	2007 TX_{446}	—	October 10, 2007	Catalina	CSS	LIX	3.0 km	MPC · JPL
597719	2007 TM_{458}	—	October 12, 2007	Mount Lemmon	Mount Lemmon Survey	TEL	1.4 km	MPC · JPL
597720	2007 TV_{459}	—	October 15, 2007	Kitt Peak	Spacewatch	·	1.8 km	MPC · JPL
597721	2007 TW_{460}	—	October 11, 2007	Kitt Peak	Spacewatch	V	450 m	MPC · JPL
597722	2007 TJ_{461}	—	August 2, 2016	Haleakala	Pan-STARRS 1	·	1.6 km	MPC · JPL
597723	2007 TK_{461}	—	October 12, 2007	Kitt Peak	Spacewatch	·	520 m	MPC · JPL
597724	2007 TH_{462}	—	October 15, 2007	Kitt Peak	Spacewatch	HNS	1.0 km	MPC · JPL
597725	2007 TS_{462}	—	April 30, 2015	Mount Lemmon	Mount Lemmon Survey	·	1.4 km	MPC · JPL
597726	2007 TW_{462}	—	April 10, 2013	Haleakala	Pan-STARRS 1	·	590 m	MPC · JPL
597727	2007 TZ_{462}	—	April 5, 2014	Haleakala	Pan-STARRS 1	·	1.7 km	MPC · JPL
597728	2007 TV_{465}	—	August 24, 2011	Haleakala	Pan-STARRS 1	·	1.8 km	MPC · JPL
597729	2007 TE_{466}	—	October 10, 2007	Kitt Peak	Spacewatch	·	2.2 km	MPC · JPL
597730	2007 TF_{466}	—	October 8, 2007	Mount Lemmon	Mount Lemmon Survey	·	1.9 km	MPC · JPL
597731	2007 TK_{467}	—	October 12, 2007	Catalina	CSS	·	870 m	MPC · JPL
597732	2007 TL_{467}	—	October 10, 2007	Mount Lemmon	Mount Lemmon Survey	·	1.8 km	MPC · JPL
597733	2007 TD_{469}	—	September 16, 2017	Haleakala	Pan-STARRS 1	·	1.9 km	MPC · JPL
597734	2007 TE_{470}	—	September 6, 2012	Haleakala	Pan-STARRS 1	H	420 m	MPC · JPL
597735	2007 TT_{472}	—	October 15, 2007	Kitt Peak	Spacewatch	·	1.0 km	MPC · JPL
597736	2007 TZ_{473}	—	October 12, 2007	Mount Lemmon	Mount Lemmon Survey	·	1.6 km	MPC · JPL
597737	2007 TN_{475}	—	October 11, 2007	Mount Lemmon	Mount Lemmon Survey	·	1.4 km	MPC · JPL
597738	2007 TQ_{475}	—	September 15, 2007	Catalina	CSS	·	1.9 km	MPC · JPL
597739	2007 TD_{478}	—	February 15, 2013	Haleakala	Pan-STARRS 1	L4	7.9 km	MPC · JPL
597740	2007 TE_{478}	—	October 9, 2007	Kitt Peak	Spacewatch	·	1.9 km	MPC · JPL
597741	2007 TG_{479}	—	January 1, 2009	Kitt Peak	Spacewatch	·	1.3 km	MPC · JPL
597742	2007 TL_{479}	—	April 3, 2016	Haleakala	Pan-STARRS 1	·	470 m	MPC · JPL
597743	2007 TB_{483}	—	October 7, 2007	Mount Lemmon	Mount Lemmon Survey	H	330 m	MPC · JPL
597744	2007 TY_{487}	—	October 9, 2007	Kitt Peak	Spacewatch	EUN	1.3 km	MPC · JPL
597745	2007 TP_{490}	—	October 10, 2007	Anderson Mesa	LONEOS	·	1.3 km	MPC · JPL
597746	2007 TK_{491}	—	October 12, 2007	Kitt Peak	Spacewatch	·	1.0 km	MPC · JPL
597747	2007 TQ_{491}	—	October 9, 2007	Mount Lemmon	Mount Lemmon Survey	·	510 m	MPC · JPL
597748	2007 TM_{494}	—	October 8, 2007	Mount Lemmon	Mount Lemmon Survey	·	1.2 km	MPC · JPL
597749	2007 TC_{497}	—	October 12, 2007	Kitt Peak	Spacewatch	(1298)	2.2 km	MPC · JPL
597750	2007 TU_{497}	—	October 9, 2007	Mount Lemmon	Mount Lemmon Survey	PAD	1.0 km	MPC · JPL
597751	2007 TD_{499}	—	October 15, 2007	Mount Lemmon	Mount Lemmon Survey	·	2.3 km	MPC · JPL
597752	2007 UY_{8}	—	October 16, 2007	Catalina	CSS	·	1.1 km	MPC · JPL
597753	2007 UD_{17}	—	September 12, 2007	Mount Lemmon	Mount Lemmon Survey	·	1.4 km	MPC · JPL
597754	2007 UG_{32}	—	October 19, 2007	Mount Lemmon	Mount Lemmon Survey	·	1.5 km	MPC · JPL
597755	2007 UQ_{40}	—	September 9, 2007	Mount Lemmon	Mount Lemmon Survey	·	530 m	MPC · JPL
597756	2007 UR_{40}	—	March 9, 2005	Mount Lemmon	Mount Lemmon Survey	·	2.2 km	MPC · JPL
597757	2007 UQ_{45}	—	October 11, 2007	Kitt Peak	Spacewatch	MIS	2.1 km	MPC · JPL
597758	2007 UX_{49}	—	October 16, 2003	Palomar	NEAT	·	1.4 km	MPC · JPL
597759	2007 UA_{58}	—	October 8, 2007	Bergisch Gladbach	W. Bickel	·	2.0 km	MPC · JPL
597760	2007 UL_{64}	—	October 30, 2007	Mount Lemmon	Mount Lemmon Survey	·	1.0 km	MPC · JPL
597761	2007 UM_{64}	—	May 30, 2006	Mount Lemmon	Mount Lemmon Survey	·	1.4 km	MPC · JPL
597762	2007 UD_{66}	—	October 17, 2007	Catalina	CSS	·	1.5 km	MPC · JPL
597763	2007 UP_{73}	—	October 12, 2007	Kitt Peak	Spacewatch	·	1.4 km	MPC · JPL
597764	2007 US_{74}	—	October 31, 2007	Mount Lemmon	Mount Lemmon Survey	·	760 m	MPC · JPL
597765	2007 UR_{92}	—	October 11, 2007	Kitt Peak	Spacewatch	·	1.4 km	MPC · JPL
597766	2007 UC_{105}	—	October 30, 2007	Kitt Peak	Spacewatch	KOR	1.2 km	MPC · JPL
597767	2007 UF_{109}	—	October 8, 2007	Kitt Peak	Spacewatch	·	620 m	MPC · JPL
597768	2007 UO_{110}	—	October 30, 2007	Mount Lemmon	Mount Lemmon Survey	·	1.8 km	MPC · JPL
597769	2007 UZ_{111}	—	October 30, 2007	Mount Lemmon	Mount Lemmon Survey	·	1.6 km	MPC · JPL
597770	2007 UO_{117}	—	October 31, 2007	Mount Lemmon	Mount Lemmon Survey	·	740 m	MPC · JPL
597771	2007 UD_{118}	—	October 31, 2007	Mount Lemmon	Mount Lemmon Survey	·	2.1 km	MPC · JPL
597772	2007 UG_{118}	—	October 31, 2007	Mount Lemmon	Mount Lemmon Survey	·	1.6 km	MPC · JPL
597773	2007 UG_{122}	—	October 12, 2007	Kitt Peak	Spacewatch	·	1.7 km	MPC · JPL
597774	2007 UP_{143}	—	October 4, 2007	Kitt Peak	Spacewatch	·	1.7 km	MPC · JPL
597775	2007 UU_{146}	—	October 8, 2016	Haleakala	Pan-STARRS 1	·	1.5 km	MPC · JPL
597776	2007 UR_{147}	—	September 30, 2014	Kitt Peak	Spacewatch	·	600 m	MPC · JPL
597777	2007 UK_{148}	—	March 26, 2009	Kitt Peak	Spacewatch	·	590 m	MPC · JPL
597778	2007 UJ_{149}	—	October 30, 2007	Mount Lemmon	Mount Lemmon Survey	·	500 m	MPC · JPL
597779	2007 UA_{150}	—	February 18, 2010	Mount Lemmon	Mount Lemmon Survey	EUN	1.0 km	MPC · JPL
597780	2007 UU_{150}	—	October 16, 2007	Kitt Peak	Spacewatch	·	2.0 km	MPC · JPL
597781	2007 UE_{152}	—	October 20, 2007	Mount Lemmon	Mount Lemmon Survey	·	1.5 km	MPC · JPL
597782	2007 UC_{153}	—	October 17, 2007	Mount Lemmon	Mount Lemmon Survey	·	1.2 km	MPC · JPL
597783	2007 UP_{156}	—	October 18, 2007	Mount Lemmon	Mount Lemmon Survey	·	1.7 km	MPC · JPL
597784	2007 UT_{158}	—	September 15, 2007	Mount Lemmon	Mount Lemmon Survey	·	1.5 km	MPC · JPL
597785	2007 US_{159}	—	October 17, 2007	Mount Lemmon	Mount Lemmon Survey	·	1.2 km	MPC · JPL
597786	2007 UN_{162}	—	October 18, 2007	Mount Lemmon	Mount Lemmon Survey	·	2.7 km	MPC · JPL
597787	2007 UV_{162}	—	October 16, 2007	Mount Lemmon	Mount Lemmon Survey	·	2.2 km	MPC · JPL
597788	2007 VH_{18}	—	November 1, 2007	Mount Lemmon	Mount Lemmon Survey	·	610 m	MPC · JPL
597789	2007 VW_{18}	—	October 10, 2007	Kitt Peak	Spacewatch	AST	1.3 km	MPC · JPL
597790	2007 VU_{24}	—	February 13, 2002	Kitt Peak	Spacewatch	·	660 m	MPC · JPL
597791	2007 VF_{38}	—	October 9, 2007	Kitt Peak	Spacewatch	·	1.5 km	MPC · JPL
597792	2007 VK_{39}	—	October 10, 2007	Kitt Peak	Spacewatch	·	640 m	MPC · JPL
597793	2007 VF_{40}	—	October 10, 2007	Mount Lemmon	Mount Lemmon Survey	·	1.6 km	MPC · JPL
597794	2007 VY_{52}	—	September 18, 2007	Mount Lemmon	Mount Lemmon Survey	DOR	1.6 km	MPC · JPL
597795	2007 VW_{74}	—	October 7, 2007	Mount Lemmon	Mount Lemmon Survey	·	1.7 km	MPC · JPL
597796	2007 VN_{81}	—	November 4, 2007	Kitt Peak	Spacewatch	·	1.5 km	MPC · JPL
597797	2007 VL_{86}	—	September 25, 2007	Mount Lemmon	Mount Lemmon Survey	EUN	910 m	MPC · JPL
597798	2007 VU_{86}	—	October 9, 2007	Kitt Peak	Spacewatch	·	2.8 km	MPC · JPL
597799	2007 VD_{92}	—	November 7, 2007	Socorro	LINEAR	H	350 m	MPC · JPL
597800	2007 VA_{98}	—	October 24, 2007	Mount Lemmon	Mount Lemmon Survey	·	890 m	MPC · JPL

== 597801–597900 ==
back to top

Designation			Discovery			Properties		Ref
Permanent	Provisional	Named after	Date	Site	Discoverer(s)	Category	Diam.	Ref
597801	2007 VQ_{100}	—	November 2, 2007	Kitt Peak	Spacewatch	·	3.2 km	MPC · JPL
597802	2007 VL_{112}	—	November 3, 2007	Kitt Peak	Spacewatch	·	710 m	MPC · JPL
597803	2007 VW_{113}	—	November 3, 2007	Kitt Peak	Spacewatch	·	1.6 km	MPC · JPL
597804	2007 VZ_{119}	—	September 14, 2007	Mount Lemmon	Mount Lemmon Survey	·	2.8 km	MPC · JPL
597805	2007 VJ_{124}	—	November 5, 2007	Mount Lemmon	Mount Lemmon Survey	THM	1.8 km	MPC · JPL
597806	2007 VK_{124}	—	November 5, 2007	Mount Lemmon	Mount Lemmon Survey	·	1.7 km	MPC · JPL
597807	2007 VE_{128}	—	November 1, 2007	Mount Lemmon	Mount Lemmon Survey	NYS	780 m	MPC · JPL
597808	2007 VV_{131}	—	November 2, 2007	Mount Lemmon	Mount Lemmon Survey	·	1.7 km	MPC · JPL
597809	2007 VM_{133}	—	October 10, 2007	Kitt Peak	Spacewatch	·	550 m	MPC · JPL
597810	2007 VX_{135}	—	October 8, 2007	Mount Lemmon	Mount Lemmon Survey	·	1.6 km	MPC · JPL
597811	2007 VU_{136}	—	October 4, 2007	Kitt Peak	Spacewatch	·	1.3 km	MPC · JPL
597812	2007 VL_{138}	—	October 16, 2007	Mount Lemmon	Mount Lemmon Survey	·	1.6 km	MPC · JPL
597813	2007 VV_{139}	—	November 3, 2007	Kitt Peak	Spacewatch	GAL	1.7 km	MPC · JPL
597814	2007 VN_{140}	—	October 15, 2007	Kitt Peak	Spacewatch	·	1.8 km	MPC · JPL
597815	2007 VA_{141}	—	November 4, 2007	Mount Lemmon	Mount Lemmon Survey	PHO	760 m	MPC · JPL
597816	2007 VC_{141}	—	November 4, 2007	Mount Lemmon	Mount Lemmon Survey	·	470 m	MPC · JPL
597817	2007 VT_{145}	—	November 4, 2007	Kitt Peak	Spacewatch	EOS	2.1 km	MPC · JPL
597818	2007 VE_{157}	—	October 20, 2007	Mount Lemmon	Mount Lemmon Survey	·	690 m	MPC · JPL
597819	2007 VL_{159}	—	November 5, 2007	Kitt Peak	Spacewatch	HOF	3.0 km	MPC · JPL
597820	2007 VR_{161}	—	November 5, 2007	Kitt Peak	Spacewatch	·	750 m	MPC · JPL
597821	2007 VC_{172}	—	November 7, 2007	Kitt Peak	Spacewatch	·	800 m	MPC · JPL
597822	2007 VS_{174}	—	November 4, 2007	Mount Lemmon	Mount Lemmon Survey	·	2.1 km	MPC · JPL
597823	2007 VZ_{174}	—	October 12, 2007	Kitt Peak	Spacewatch	·	1.4 km	MPC · JPL
597824	2007 VU_{176}	—	October 8, 2007	Mount Lemmon	Mount Lemmon Survey	·	660 m	MPC · JPL
597825	2007 VA_{178}	—	November 7, 2007	Mount Lemmon	Mount Lemmon Survey	·	670 m	MPC · JPL
597826	2007 VM_{179}	—	October 30, 2007	Kitt Peak	Spacewatch	AGN	960 m	MPC · JPL
597827	2007 VP_{189}	—	January 13, 2005	Kitt Peak	Spacewatch	·	700 m	MPC · JPL
597828	2007 VA_{191}	—	November 15, 2007	Catalina	CSS	H	480 m	MPC · JPL
597829	2007 VZ_{195}	—	October 23, 2007	Kitt Peak	Spacewatch	·	580 m	MPC · JPL
597830	2007 VR_{204}	—	November 9, 2007	Mount Lemmon	Mount Lemmon Survey	·	640 m	MPC · JPL
597831	2007 VC_{206}	—	November 9, 2007	Mount Lemmon	Mount Lemmon Survey	·	740 m	MPC · JPL
597832	2007 VF_{208}	—	November 11, 2007	Mount Lemmon	Mount Lemmon Survey	·	1.6 km	MPC · JPL
597833	2007 VH_{211}	—	December 21, 2003	Kitt Peak	Spacewatch	·	1.8 km	MPC · JPL
597834	2007 VM_{213}	—	November 9, 2007	Kitt Peak	Spacewatch	AGN	1.3 km	MPC · JPL
597835	2007 VR_{220}	—	November 9, 2007	Kitt Peak	Spacewatch	·	1.3 km	MPC · JPL
597836	2007 VN_{231}	—	November 1, 2007	Kitt Peak	Spacewatch	·	2.0 km	MPC · JPL
597837	2007 VG_{247}	—	November 9, 2007	Eskridge	G. Hug	·	2.6 km	MPC · JPL
597838	2007 VQ_{248}	—	November 5, 2007	Catalina	CSS	·	740 m	MPC · JPL
597839	2007 VT_{249}	—	November 14, 2007	Mount Lemmon	Mount Lemmon Survey	·	1.3 km	MPC · JPL
597840	2007 VO_{252}	—	September 23, 2017	Haleakala	Pan-STARRS 1	·	420 m	MPC · JPL
597841	2007 VK_{257}	—	November 13, 2007	Mount Lemmon	Mount Lemmon Survey	·	1.4 km	MPC · JPL
597842	2007 VH_{262}	—	August 25, 2003	Palomar	NEAT	NYS	1.1 km	MPC · JPL
597843	2007 VS_{262}	—	November 13, 2007	Mount Lemmon	Mount Lemmon Survey	·	1.4 km	MPC · JPL
597844	2007 VW_{279}	—	September 10, 2007	Mount Lemmon	Mount Lemmon Survey	·	520 m	MPC · JPL
597845	2007 VX_{279}	—	November 14, 2007	Kitt Peak	Spacewatch	AST	1.6 km	MPC · JPL
597846	2007 VQ_{281}	—	October 15, 2007	Mount Lemmon	Mount Lemmon Survey	·	1.8 km	MPC · JPL
597847	2007 VZ_{288}	—	October 15, 2007	Mount Lemmon	Mount Lemmon Survey	·	630 m	MPC · JPL
597848	2007 VC_{289}	—	November 2, 2007	Mount Lemmon	Mount Lemmon Survey	H	370 m	MPC · JPL
597849	2007 VQ_{289}	—	November 13, 2007	Mount Lemmon	Mount Lemmon Survey	·	1.9 km	MPC · JPL
597850	2007 VG_{292}	—	November 14, 2007	Kitt Peak	Spacewatch	ADE	1.6 km	MPC · JPL
597851	2007 VF_{295}	—	November 13, 2007	Mount Lemmon	Mount Lemmon Survey	·	2.3 km	MPC · JPL
597852	2007 VZ_{295}	—	November 3, 2007	Kitt Peak	Spacewatch	·	2.5 km	MPC · JPL
597853	2007 VV_{303}	—	November 4, 2007	Catalina	CSS	H	400 m	MPC · JPL
597854	2007 VQ_{318}	—	November 9, 2007	Kitt Peak	Spacewatch	·	2.1 km	MPC · JPL
597855	2007 VZ_{319}	—	October 16, 2007	Catalina	CSS	·	3.4 km	MPC · JPL
597856	2007 VD_{336}	—	November 5, 2007	Kitt Peak	Spacewatch	DOR	2.2 km	MPC · JPL
597857	2007 VV_{338}	—	November 3, 2007	Kitt Peak	Spacewatch	·	1.5 km	MPC · JPL
597858	2007 VZ_{339}	—	November 11, 2007	Mount Lemmon	Mount Lemmon Survey	·	750 m	MPC · JPL
597859	2007 VC_{341}	—	November 7, 2007	Mount Lemmon	Mount Lemmon Survey	·	1.9 km	MPC · JPL
597860	2007 VR_{341}	—	November 11, 2007	Catalina	CSS	·	1.8 km	MPC · JPL
597861	2007 VX_{343}	—	December 23, 2012	Haleakala	Pan-STARRS 1	·	1.7 km	MPC · JPL
597862	2007 VE_{344}	—	November 7, 2007	Kitt Peak	Spacewatch	·	1.1 km	MPC · JPL
597863	2007 VD_{345}	—	April 30, 2014	Haleakala	Pan-STARRS 1	·	1.8 km	MPC · JPL
597864	2007 VG_{345}	—	November 5, 2007	Kitt Peak	Spacewatch	·	550 m	MPC · JPL
597865	2007 VL_{348}	—	November 4, 2016	Haleakala	Pan-STARRS 1	·	1.5 km	MPC · JPL
597866	2007 VW_{348}	—	October 3, 2014	Mount Lemmon	Mount Lemmon Survey	V	450 m	MPC · JPL
597867	2007 VL_{349}	—	June 22, 2015	Haleakala	Pan-STARRS 1	PAD	1.2 km	MPC · JPL
597868	2007 VX_{350}	—	November 2, 2007	Kitt Peak	Spacewatch	·	2.2 km	MPC · JPL
597869	2007 VJ_{351}	—	November 2, 2007	Kitt Peak	Spacewatch	·	2.1 km	MPC · JPL
597870	2007 VG_{355}	—	February 4, 2009	Mount Lemmon	Mount Lemmon Survey	·	1.6 km	MPC · JPL
597871	2007 VF_{356}	—	November 8, 2007	Kitt Peak	Spacewatch	·	490 m	MPC · JPL
597872	2007 VM_{356}	—	February 27, 2014	Haleakala	Pan-STARRS 1	·	1.5 km	MPC · JPL
597873	2007 VW_{356}	—	November 12, 2012	Mount Lemmon	Mount Lemmon Survey	·	1.6 km	MPC · JPL
597874	2007 VC_{357}	—	November 15, 2012	Catalina	CSS	·	4.4 km	MPC · JPL
597875	2007 VM_{357}	—	October 9, 2016	Haleakala	Pan-STARRS 1	HOF	2.0 km	MPC · JPL
597876	2007 VP_{359}	—	October 12, 2007	Mount Lemmon	Mount Lemmon Survey	·	1.5 km	MPC · JPL
597877	2007 VK_{361}	—	March 3, 2009	Mount Lemmon	Mount Lemmon Survey	·	620 m	MPC · JPL
597878	2007 VV_{361}	—	February 5, 2009	Kitt Peak	Spacewatch	·	1.3 km	MPC · JPL
597879	2007 VM_{362}	—	August 27, 2016	Haleakala	Pan-STARRS 1	KOR	1.0 km	MPC · JPL
597880	2007 VY_{362}	—	November 5, 2007	Mount Lemmon	Mount Lemmon Survey	AST	1.4 km	MPC · JPL
597881	2007 VY_{363}	—	November 3, 2007	Kitt Peak	Spacewatch	·	910 m	MPC · JPL
597882	2007 VR_{364}	—	November 2, 2007	Mount Lemmon	Mount Lemmon Survey	·	1.6 km	MPC · JPL
597883	2007 VJ_{366}	—	November 2, 2007	Kitt Peak	Spacewatch	·	720 m	MPC · JPL
597884	2007 VA_{367}	—	November 2, 2007	Mount Lemmon	Mount Lemmon Survey	PAD	1.2 km	MPC · JPL
597885	2007 VD_{367}	—	November 4, 2007	Mount Lemmon	Mount Lemmon Survey	·	1.5 km	MPC · JPL
597886	2007 VZ_{369}	—	November 3, 2007	Kitt Peak	Spacewatch	·	530 m	MPC · JPL
597887	2007 VN_{375}	—	November 9, 2007	Kitt Peak	Spacewatch	EOS	1.7 km	MPC · JPL
597888	2007 VR_{375}	—	November 3, 2007	Mount Lemmon	Mount Lemmon Survey	·	2.6 km	MPC · JPL
597889	2007 WF_{13}	—	November 2, 2007	Catalina	CSS	JUN	860 m	MPC · JPL
597890	2007 WK_{24}	—	December 19, 2004	Mount Lemmon	Mount Lemmon Survey	·	640 m	MPC · JPL
597891	2007 WM_{25}	—	November 18, 2007	Mount Lemmon	Mount Lemmon Survey	·	1.8 km	MPC · JPL
597892	2007 WJ_{30}	—	November 1, 2007	Kitt Peak	Spacewatch	HOF	2.9 km	MPC · JPL
597893	2007 WE_{31}	—	September 10, 2007	Mount Lemmon	Mount Lemmon Survey	·	840 m	MPC · JPL
597894	2007 WF_{31}	—	November 19, 2007	Kitt Peak	Spacewatch	H	360 m	MPC · JPL
597895	2007 WQ_{31}	—	November 2, 2007	Kitt Peak	Spacewatch	·	700 m	MPC · JPL
597896	2007 WA_{35}	—	November 19, 2007	Mount Lemmon	Mount Lemmon Survey	·	460 m	MPC · JPL
597897	2007 WP_{35}	—	November 19, 2007	Mount Lemmon	Mount Lemmon Survey	·	1.2 km	MPC · JPL
597898	2007 WL_{37}	—	November 19, 2007	Mount Lemmon	Mount Lemmon Survey	·	900 m	MPC · JPL
597899	2007 WX_{39}	—	November 2, 2007	Mount Lemmon	Mount Lemmon Survey	·	1.4 km	MPC · JPL
597900	2007 WT_{41}	—	November 18, 2007	Mount Lemmon	Mount Lemmon Survey	·	1.5 km	MPC · JPL

== 597901–598000 ==
back to top

Designation			Discovery			Properties		Ref
Permanent	Provisional	Named after	Date	Site	Discoverer(s)	Category	Diam.	Ref
597901	2007 WM_{42}	—	November 8, 2007	Kitt Peak	Spacewatch	·	2.9 km	MPC · JPL
597902	2007 WU_{46}	—	October 9, 2007	Kitt Peak	Spacewatch	·	2.2 km	MPC · JPL
597903	2007 WN_{47}	—	January 30, 2004	Kitt Peak	Spacewatch	·	1.6 km	MPC · JPL
597904	2007 WB_{54}	—	November 3, 2007	Kitt Peak	Spacewatch	·	1.3 km	MPC · JPL
597905	2007 WV_{57}	—	November 18, 2007	Mount Lemmon	Mount Lemmon Survey	·	1.8 km	MPC · JPL
597906	2007 WW_{68}	—	November 8, 2007	Kitt Peak	Spacewatch	·	1.1 km	MPC · JPL
597907	2007 WP_{69}	—	November 20, 2007	Mount Lemmon	Mount Lemmon Survey	PAD	1.3 km	MPC · JPL
597908	2007 WR_{69}	—	March 23, 2014	Mount Lemmon	Mount Lemmon Survey	·	1.6 km	MPC · JPL
597909	2007 WS_{69}	—	September 27, 2016	Haleakala	Pan-STARRS 1	·	1.6 km	MPC · JPL
597910	2007 WW_{69}	—	February 3, 2009	Kitt Peak	Spacewatch	·	1.9 km	MPC · JPL
597911	2007 WO_{74}	—	November 5, 2007	Kitt Peak	Spacewatch	KOR	1.2 km	MPC · JPL
597912	2007 XS_{7}	—	November 15, 2007	Catalina	CSS	·	2.0 km	MPC · JPL
597913	2007 XN_{12}	—	October 14, 2007	Mount Lemmon	Mount Lemmon Survey	·	1.8 km	MPC · JPL
597914	2007 XV_{19}	—	November 15, 2007	Mount Lemmon	Mount Lemmon Survey	·	1.3 km	MPC · JPL
597915	2007 XY_{31}	—	November 1, 2007	Kitt Peak	Spacewatch	ADE	1.5 km	MPC · JPL
597916	2007 XC_{46}	—	December 15, 2007	Catalina	CSS	·	1.9 km	MPC · JPL
597917	2007 XS_{55}	—	December 5, 2007	Kitt Peak	Spacewatch	·	760 m	MPC · JPL
597918	2007 XE_{61}	—	November 4, 2007	Kitt Peak	Spacewatch	·	1.7 km	MPC · JPL
597919	2007 XL_{61}	—	May 24, 2015	Haleakala	Pan-STARRS 1	·	1.9 km	MPC · JPL
597920	2007 XV_{61}	—	December 4, 2007	Kitt Peak	Spacewatch	·	1.6 km	MPC · JPL
597921	2007 XS_{62}	—	April 7, 2014	Mount Lemmon	Mount Lemmon Survey	·	1.8 km	MPC · JPL
597922	2007 XN_{64}	—	December 5, 2007	Mount Lemmon	Mount Lemmon Survey	·	660 m	MPC · JPL
597923	2007 XV_{64}	—	October 26, 2011	Haleakala	Pan-STARRS 1	·	1.1 km	MPC · JPL
597924	2007 XJ_{67}	—	September 26, 2011	Mount Lemmon	Mount Lemmon Survey	·	1.4 km	MPC · JPL
597925	2007 XN_{67}	—	October 2, 2016	Kitt Peak	Spacewatch	AST	1.5 km	MPC · JPL
597926	2007 XZ_{67}	—	December 4, 2007	Kitt Peak	Spacewatch	·	1.6 km	MPC · JPL
597927	2007 XF_{69}	—	December 4, 2007	Mount Lemmon	Mount Lemmon Survey	URS	3.1 km	MPC · JPL
597928	2007 XS_{69}	—	December 4, 2007	Kitt Peak	Spacewatch	·	700 m	MPC · JPL
597929	2007 XL_{70}	—	December 3, 2007	Kitt Peak	Spacewatch	·	1.5 km	MPC · JPL
597930	2007 XE_{71}	—	December 4, 2007	Mount Lemmon	Mount Lemmon Survey	·	3.2 km	MPC · JPL
597931	2007 YN	—	December 16, 2007	Uccle	P. De Cat	H	680 m	MPC · JPL
597932	2007 YR_{1}	—	December 16, 2007	Lulin	LUSS	·	860 m	MPC · JPL
597933	2007 YZ_{11}	—	December 17, 2007	Mount Lemmon	Mount Lemmon Survey	EOS	1.8 km	MPC · JPL
597934	2007 YV_{16}	—	November 14, 2007	Kitt Peak	Spacewatch	KOR	1.4 km	MPC · JPL
597935	2007 YQ_{17}	—	December 16, 2007	Kitt Peak	Spacewatch	·	1.4 km	MPC · JPL
597936	2007 YU_{18}	—	December 16, 2007	Kitt Peak	Spacewatch	·	3.0 km	MPC · JPL
597937	2007 YQ_{19}	—	November 2, 2007	Mount Lemmon	Mount Lemmon Survey	·	2.3 km	MPC · JPL
597938	2007 YU_{19}	—	September 28, 2006	Kitt Peak	Spacewatch	·	2.5 km	MPC · JPL
597939	2007 YS_{22}	—	October 19, 2007	Mount Lemmon	Mount Lemmon Survey	·	1.9 km	MPC · JPL
597940	2007 YV_{28}	—	December 19, 2007	Kitt Peak	Spacewatch	·	1.9 km	MPC · JPL
597941	2007 YN_{31}	—	July 29, 2001	Palomar	NEAT	H	680 m	MPC · JPL
597942	2007 YB_{39}	—	December 5, 2007	Kitt Peak	Spacewatch	·	1.3 km	MPC · JPL
597943	2007 YM_{45}	—	December 30, 2007	Mount Lemmon	Mount Lemmon Survey	ADE	1.7 km	MPC · JPL
597944	2007 YD_{50}	—	December 28, 2007	Kitt Peak	Spacewatch	EUN	1 km	MPC · JPL
597945	2007 YM_{50}	—	December 28, 2007	Kitt Peak	Spacewatch	·	1.2 km	MPC · JPL
597946	2007 YJ_{54}	—	December 31, 2007	Mount Lemmon	Mount Lemmon Survey	·	670 m	MPC · JPL
597947	2007 YW_{74}	—	December 31, 2007	Mount Lemmon	Mount Lemmon Survey	·	1.7 km	MPC · JPL
597948	2007 YF_{75}	—	December 30, 2007	Mount Lemmon	Mount Lemmon Survey	VER	2.4 km	MPC · JPL
597949	2007 YO_{76}	—	December 18, 2007	Mount Lemmon	Mount Lemmon Survey	·	2.2 km	MPC · JPL
597950	2007 YB_{77}	—	December 19, 2007	Mount Lemmon	Mount Lemmon Survey	GEF	1.2 km	MPC · JPL
597951	2007 YN_{78}	—	February 14, 2013	Haleakala	Pan-STARRS 1	·	1.8 km	MPC · JPL
597952	2007 YQ_{82}	—	November 14, 2012	Kitt Peak	Spacewatch	·	2.0 km	MPC · JPL
597953	2007 YZ_{82}	—	December 31, 2007	Kitt Peak	Spacewatch	MAS	480 m	MPC · JPL
597954	2007 YG_{84}	—	November 23, 2012	Kitt Peak	Spacewatch	THM	1.6 km	MPC · JPL
597955	2007 YC_{85}	—	October 15, 2012	Haleakala	Pan-STARRS 1	·	2.0 km	MPC · JPL
597956	2007 YM_{87}	—	December 16, 2007	Kitt Peak	Spacewatch	·	1.5 km	MPC · JPL
597957	2007 YG_{92}	—	December 17, 2007	Mount Lemmon	Mount Lemmon Survey	·	2.2 km	MPC · JPL
597958	2007 YO_{92}	—	December 30, 2007	Mount Lemmon	Mount Lemmon Survey	H	400 m	MPC · JPL
597959	2007 YN_{93}	—	December 18, 2007	Mount Lemmon	Mount Lemmon Survey	·	1.7 km	MPC · JPL
597960	2007 YO_{94}	—	December 16, 2007	Mount Lemmon	Mount Lemmon Survey	·	2.4 km	MPC · JPL
597961	2007 YK_{95}	—	December 19, 2007	Kitt Peak	Spacewatch	·	2.5 km	MPC · JPL
597962	2008 AA_{9}	—	January 1, 2008	Junk Bond	D. Healy	NYS	1.1 km	MPC · JPL
597963	2008 AJ_{12}	—	January 10, 2008	Mount Lemmon	Mount Lemmon Survey	·	760 m	MPC · JPL
597964	2008 AH_{31}	—	January 10, 2008	Marly	P. Kocher	·	1.9 km	MPC · JPL
597965	2008 AK_{31}	—	January 10, 2008	Rehoboth	A. Vanden Heuvel	GEF	1.1 km	MPC · JPL
597966 Laihe	2008 AR_{33}	Laihe	January 12, 2008	Lulin	LUSS	PHO	930 m	MPC · JPL
597967 Pannai	2008 AN_{45}	Pannai	January 10, 2008	Lulin	LUSS	H	510 m	MPC · JPL
597968	2008 AY_{69}	—	January 3, 2008	Kitt Peak	Spacewatch	·	1.8 km	MPC · JPL
597969	2008 AF_{71}	—	January 12, 2008	Kitt Peak	Spacewatch	H	360 m	MPC · JPL
597970	2008 AW_{73}	—	January 10, 2008	Mount Lemmon	Mount Lemmon Survey	·	1.8 km	MPC · JPL
597971	2008 AM_{74}	—	January 11, 2008	Kitt Peak	Spacewatch	·	840 m	MPC · JPL
597972	2008 AM_{80}	—	November 19, 2007	Mount Lemmon	Mount Lemmon Survey	·	1.9 km	MPC · JPL
597973	2008 AS_{80}	—	January 12, 2008	Kitt Peak	Spacewatch	·	860 m	MPC · JPL
597974	2008 AJ_{88}	—	August 20, 2006	Palomar	NEAT	·	2.6 km	MPC · JPL
597975	2008 AA_{95}	—	January 14, 2008	Kitt Peak	Spacewatch	·	1.2 km	MPC · JPL
597976	2008 AN_{101}	—	January 15, 2008	Kitt Peak	Spacewatch	NAE	2.1 km	MPC · JPL
597977	2008 AE_{109}	—	December 16, 2007	Kitt Peak	Spacewatch	·	1.4 km	MPC · JPL
597978	2008 AT_{110}	—	January 15, 2008	Kitt Peak	Spacewatch	MAS	610 m	MPC · JPL
597979	2008 AR_{121}	—	January 31, 2008	Mount Lemmon	Mount Lemmon Survey	·	1.4 km	MPC · JPL
597980	2008 AW_{130}	—	September 23, 2005	Kitt Peak	Spacewatch	·	3.6 km	MPC · JPL
597981	2008 AZ_{136}	—	March 11, 2003	Palomar	NEAT	·	2.5 km	MPC · JPL
597982	2008 AB_{138}	—	January 13, 2008	Kitt Peak	Spacewatch	·	1.7 km	MPC · JPL
597983	2008 AW_{141}	—	January 1, 2008	Kitt Peak	Spacewatch	·	1.7 km	MPC · JPL
597984	2008 AB_{144}	—	January 1, 2008	Kitt Peak	Spacewatch	GAL	1.4 km	MPC · JPL
597985	2008 AS_{144}	—	January 11, 2008	Mount Lemmon	Mount Lemmon Survey	·	1.4 km	MPC · JPL
597986	2008 AY_{144}	—	April 5, 2014	Haleakala	Pan-STARRS 1	·	1.6 km	MPC · JPL
597987	2008 AZ_{146}	—	January 1, 2008	Kitt Peak	Spacewatch	KOR	1.1 km	MPC · JPL
597988	2008 AC_{147}	—	April 21, 2009	Mount Lemmon	Mount Lemmon Survey	·	1.6 km	MPC · JPL
597989	2008 AN_{147}	—	January 13, 2008	Kitt Peak	Spacewatch	·	1.6 km	MPC · JPL
597990	2008 AX_{151}	—	January 15, 2008	Mount Lemmon	Mount Lemmon Survey	GEF	1.0 km	MPC · JPL
597991	2008 AV_{155}	—	January 11, 2008	Kitt Peak	Spacewatch	·	2.2 km	MPC · JPL
597992	2008 BP_{4}	—	January 16, 2008	Kitt Peak	Spacewatch	·	780 m	MPC · JPL
597993 Bélesta	2008 BZ_{23}	Bélesta	January 28, 2008	Belesta	Martinez, P.	·	2.0 km	MPC · JPL
597994	2008 BN_{30}	—	January 30, 2008	Mount Lemmon	Mount Lemmon Survey	·	790 m	MPC · JPL
597995	2008 BY_{52}	—	August 4, 2005	Palomar	NEAT	·	3.9 km	MPC · JPL
597996	2008 BM_{56}	—	October 23, 2011	Mount Lemmon	Mount Lemmon Survey	·	1.6 km	MPC · JPL
597997	2008 BO_{56}	—	January 18, 2008	Kitt Peak	Spacewatch	·	820 m	MPC · JPL
597998	2008 BE_{57}	—	January 28, 2000	Kitt Peak	Spacewatch	3:2	6.2 km	MPC · JPL
597999	2008 BR_{57}	—	March 22, 2012	Mount Lemmon	Mount Lemmon Survey	·	940 m	MPC · JPL
598000	2008 CD_{15}	—	February 3, 2008	Kitt Peak	Spacewatch	·	2.2 km	MPC · JPL

back to top

== Meaning of names ==
As minor planet discoveries are confirmed, they are given a permanent number by the IAU's Minor Planet Center (MPC), and the discoverers can then submit names for them, following the IAU's naming conventions. The list below concerns those minor planets in the specified number-range that have received names, and explains the meanings of those names.

Official naming citations of newly named small Solar System bodies are approved and published in a bulletin by IAU's Working Group for Small Bodies Nomenclature (WGSBN). Before May 2021, citations were published in MPC's Minor Planet Circulars for many decades. Recent citations can also be found on the JPL Small-Body Database (SBDB). Until his death in 2016, German astronomer Lutz D. Schmadel compiled these citations into the Dictionary of Minor Planet Names (DMP) and regularly updated the collection.

Based on Paul Herget's The Names of the Minor Planets, Schmadel also researched the unclear origin of numerous asteroids, most of which had been named prior to World War II. This article incorporates text from this source, which is in the public domain: SBDB New namings may only be added to this list below after official publication as the preannouncement of names is condemned. The WGSBN publishes a comprehensive guideline for the naming rules of non-cometary small Solar System bodies.

Named minor planet	Provisional	This minor planet was named for...	Ref · Catalog
597148 Chungmingshan	2006 TV_{56}	Ming-Shan Chung (born 1956), the director of Yushan National Park in Taiwan, who has devoted himself to the development of the National parks of Taiwan for several decades.	IAU · 597148
597319 Roxanesouad	2007 BZ_{99}	Roxane Souad Christophe (b. 2010) is a granddaughter of the discoverer.	IAU · 597319
597469 Denisleahy	2007 GV_{71}	Denis Alan Leahy, Canadian astronomer and professor in the Department of Physics and Astronomy at the University of Calgary.	IAU · 597469
597470 Lauraparker	2007 GG_{72}	Laura Parker, Canadian astronomer.	IAU · 597470
597966 Laihe	2008 AR_{33}	Lai He (1894–1943), known as the Father of Modern Taiwanese Literature, wrote works that reflected the soul and spirit of Taiwanese people during the Japanese imperial colonial period	IAU · 597966
597967 Pannai	2008 AN_{45}	Pan Nai (1921–2016), a Chinese amateur historian of astronomy.	IAU · 597967
597993 Bélesta	2008 BZ_{23}	Bélesta-en-Lauragais is a small village in south-west France. The village is the site of the observatory where (597993) was discovered. Bélesta is also the name of the observatory.	IAU · 597993
