= List of minor planets: 588001–589000 =

The following is a partial list of minor planets, running from minor-planet number 588001 through 589000, inclusive. The primary data for this and other partial lists is based on JPL's "Small-Body Orbital Elements" and data available from the Minor Planet Center. Critical list information is also provided by the MPC, unless otherwise specified from Lowell Observatory. A detailed description of the table's columns and additional sources are given on the main page including a complete list of every page in this series, and a statistical break-up on the dynamical classification of minor planets.

Also see the summary list of all named bodies in numerical and alphabetical order, and the corresponding naming citations for the number range of this particular list. New namings may only be added to this list after official publication, as the preannouncement of names is condemned by the Working Group for Small Bodies Nomenclature of the International Astronomical Union.

Near-Earth obj.	MBA (inner)	MBA (outer)	Centaur
Mars-crosser	MBA (middle)	Jupiter trojan	Trans-Neptunian obj.
Unclassified

== 588001–588100 ==
Designation			Discovery			Properties		Ref
Permanent	Provisional	Named after	Date	Site	Discoverer(s)	Category	Diam.	Ref
588001	2007 EC_{106}	—	March 11, 2007	Kitt Peak	Spacewatch	NYS	780 m	MPC · JPL
588002	2007 EJ_{106}	—	March 11, 2007	Kitt Peak	Spacewatch	HYG	3.2 km	MPC · JPL
588003	2007 EY_{107}	—	March 11, 2007	Kitt Peak	Spacewatch	KON	2.3 km	MPC · JPL
588004	2007 EW_{109}	—	March 11, 2007	Kitt Peak	Spacewatch	·	1.3 km	MPC · JPL
588005	2007 EB_{110}	—	March 11, 2007	Kitt Peak	Spacewatch	·	620 m	MPC · JPL
588006	2007 EX_{113}	—	March 12, 2007	Mount Lemmon	Mount Lemmon Survey	·	1.3 km	MPC · JPL
588007	2007 ES_{121}	—	March 14, 2007	Mount Lemmon	Mount Lemmon Survey	·	930 m	MPC · JPL
588008	2007 EP_{124}	—	November 1, 2000	Kitt Peak	Spacewatch	·	1.5 km	MPC · JPL
588009	2007 EP_{126}	—	January 27, 2007	Mount Lemmon	Mount Lemmon Survey	VER	2.4 km	MPC · JPL
588010	2007 ED_{134}	—	March 9, 2007	Kitt Peak	Spacewatch	·	2.9 km	MPC · JPL
588011	2007 ER_{138}	—	February 7, 2007	Kitt Peak	Spacewatch	·	520 m	MPC · JPL
588012	2007 EW_{143}	—	March 12, 2007	Kitt Peak	Spacewatch	·	1.5 km	MPC · JPL
588013	2007 EY_{144}	—	March 12, 2007	Mount Lemmon	Mount Lemmon Survey	·	3.0 km	MPC · JPL
588014	2007 EM_{156}	—	September 17, 2003	Kitt Peak	Spacewatch	·	3.7 km	MPC · JPL
588015	2007 EV_{157}	—	March 7, 2003	Needville	J. Dellinger, Dillon, W. G.	·	1.3 km	MPC · JPL
588016	2007 ER_{158}	—	February 23, 2007	Mount Lemmon	Mount Lemmon Survey	THM	2.3 km	MPC · JPL
588017	2007 EZ_{160}	—	March 14, 2007	Kitt Peak	Spacewatch	URS	2.9 km	MPC · JPL
588018	2007 ER_{164}	—	March 15, 2007	Kitt Peak	Spacewatch	LIX	2.7 km	MPC · JPL
588019	2007 ER_{183}	—	March 12, 2007	Mount Lemmon	Mount Lemmon Survey	KOR	1.4 km	MPC · JPL
588020	2007 EG_{184}	—	March 12, 2007	Mount Lemmon	Mount Lemmon Survey	·	2.1 km	MPC · JPL
588021	2007 EF_{189}	—	March 13, 2007	Mount Lemmon	Mount Lemmon Survey	EOS	1.5 km	MPC · JPL
588022	2007 EA_{193}	—	March 14, 2007	Kitt Peak	Spacewatch	·	510 m	MPC · JPL
588023	2007 EA_{203}	—	January 25, 2007	Kitt Peak	Spacewatch	·	1.8 km	MPC · JPL
588024	2007 EC_{221}	—	March 13, 2007	Kitt Peak	Spacewatch	·	420 m	MPC · JPL
588025	2007 EH_{227}	—	March 15, 2007	Mount Lemmon	Mount Lemmon Survey	·	1.5 km	MPC · JPL
588026	2007 EM_{227}	—	January 31, 2012	Kitt Peak	Spacewatch	·	2.8 km	MPC · JPL
588027	2007 ER_{227}	—	November 2, 2010	Mount Lemmon	Mount Lemmon Survey	·	3.0 km	MPC · JPL
588028	2007 EP_{228}	—	February 8, 2002	Palomar	NEAT	·	3.0 km	MPC · JPL
588029	2007 EF_{231}	—	March 11, 1996	Kitt Peak	Spacewatch	·	2.7 km	MPC · JPL
588030	2007 EN_{231}	—	August 31, 2017	Haleakala	Pan-STARRS 1	·	1.1 km	MPC · JPL
588031	2007 EX_{231}	—	December 11, 2013	Haleakala	Pan-STARRS 1	·	1.5 km	MPC · JPL
588032	2007 EL_{233}	—	March 14, 2007	Mount Lemmon	Mount Lemmon Survey	HNS	740 m	MPC · JPL
588033	2007 EY_{233}	—	March 14, 2013	Kitt Peak	Spacewatch	·	2.4 km	MPC · JPL
588034	2007 EE_{235}	—	February 16, 2015	Haleakala	Pan-STARRS 1	·	1.3 km	MPC · JPL
588035	2007 EB_{237}	—	January 4, 2012	Mount Lemmon	Mount Lemmon Survey	·	2.5 km	MPC · JPL
588036	2007 EE_{237}	—	January 26, 2012	Mount Lemmon	Mount Lemmon Survey	·	2.1 km	MPC · JPL
588037	2007 EE_{238}	—	March 12, 2007	Catalina	CSS	·	3.9 km	MPC · JPL
588038	2007 EN_{238}	—	March 9, 2007	Kitt Peak	Spacewatch	·	1.3 km	MPC · JPL
588039	2007 EP_{239}	—	March 13, 2007	Kitt Peak	Spacewatch	·	3.0 km	MPC · JPL
588040	2007 EC_{242}	—	March 10, 2007	Mount Lemmon	Mount Lemmon Survey	·	1.0 km	MPC · JPL
588041	2007 FO_{5}	—	March 16, 2007	Kitt Peak	Spacewatch	·	2.7 km	MPC · JPL
588042	2007 FL_{8}	—	March 16, 2007	Kitt Peak	Spacewatch	ADE	1.6 km	MPC · JPL
588043	2007 FN_{9}	—	March 16, 2007	Kitt Peak	Spacewatch	·	1.4 km	MPC · JPL
588044	2007 FM_{14}	—	March 19, 2007	Mount Lemmon	Mount Lemmon Survey	·	2.9 km	MPC · JPL
588045	2007 FZ_{18}	—	February 21, 2007	Mount Lemmon	Mount Lemmon Survey	THM	1.7 km	MPC · JPL
588046	2007 FE_{19}	—	March 9, 2007	Mount Lemmon	Mount Lemmon Survey	·	670 m	MPC · JPL
588047	2007 FG_{19}	—	March 20, 2007	Mount Lemmon	Mount Lemmon Survey	·	1 km	MPC · JPL
588048	2007 FW_{24}	—	March 10, 2007	Mount Lemmon	Mount Lemmon Survey	·	590 m	MPC · JPL
588049	2007 FO_{44}	—	March 26, 2007	Mount Lemmon	Mount Lemmon Survey	MIS	2.3 km	MPC · JPL
588050	2007 FS_{45}	—	March 16, 2007	Črni Vrh	Dintinjana, B.	·	1.6 km	MPC · JPL
588051	2007 FT_{48}	—	March 26, 2007	Kitt Peak	Spacewatch	·	2.9 km	MPC · JPL
588052	2007 FN_{52}	—	March 16, 2007	Mount Lemmon	Mount Lemmon Survey	·	1.4 km	MPC · JPL
588053	2007 FG_{53}	—	January 21, 2012	Catalina	CSS	TIR	2.9 km	MPC · JPL
588054	2007 FJ_{53}	—	March 17, 2007	Anderson Mesa	LONEOS	·	3.8 km	MPC · JPL
588055	2007 FZ_{53}	—	March 25, 2007	Mount Lemmon	Mount Lemmon Survey	·	1.9 km	MPC · JPL
588056	2007 FE_{54}	—	February 10, 2015	Kitt Peak	Spacewatch	·	1.2 km	MPC · JPL
588057	2007 FP_{54}	—	September 16, 2009	Mount Lemmon	Mount Lemmon Survey	·	2.5 km	MPC · JPL
588058	2007 FP_{55}	—	March 26, 2007	Mount Lemmon	Mount Lemmon Survey	H	370 m	MPC · JPL
588059	2007 FW_{56}	—	February 6, 2007	Kitt Peak	Spacewatch	·	950 m	MPC · JPL
588060	2007 FR_{57}	—	September 11, 2015	Haleakala	Pan-STARRS 1	·	2.3 km	MPC · JPL
588061	2007 FX_{59}	—	March 16, 2007	Kitt Peak	Spacewatch	·	480 m	MPC · JPL
588062	2007 FL_{60}	—	March 16, 2007	Mount Lemmon	Mount Lemmon Survey	·	620 m	MPC · JPL
588063	2007 FJ_{61}	—	March 20, 2007	Mount Lemmon	Mount Lemmon Survey	·	1.1 km	MPC · JPL
588064	2007 GM_{1}	—	April 8, 2007	Bergisch Gladbach	W. Bickel	·	2.3 km	MPC · JPL
588065	2007 GR_{12}	—	April 11, 2007	Kitt Peak	Spacewatch	·	640 m	MPC · JPL
588066	2007 GT_{12}	—	March 11, 2007	Kitt Peak	Spacewatch	·	620 m	MPC · JPL
588067	2007 GD_{13}	—	March 11, 2007	Kitt Peak	Spacewatch	·	570 m	MPC · JPL
588068	2007 GM_{46}	—	April 14, 2007	Kitt Peak	Spacewatch	·	530 m	MPC · JPL
588069	2007 GX_{51}	—	March 15, 2007	Mount Lemmon	Mount Lemmon Survey	·	2.5 km	MPC · JPL
588070	2007 GY_{58}	—	April 15, 2007	Mount Lemmon	Mount Lemmon Survey	H	410 m	MPC · JPL
588071	2007 GB_{67}	—	April 15, 2007	Kitt Peak	Spacewatch	·	1.4 km	MPC · JPL
588072	2007 GD_{68}	—	March 11, 2007	Kitt Peak	Spacewatch	MAR	790 m	MPC · JPL
588073	2007 GS_{68}	—	March 26, 2007	Mount Lemmon	Mount Lemmon Survey	THM	2.2 km	MPC · JPL
588074	2007 GD_{72}	—	April 11, 2007	Mauna Kea	D. D. Balam, K. M. Perrett	EOS	2.2 km	MPC · JPL
588075	2007 GF_{73}	—	April 15, 2007	Kitt Peak	Spacewatch	H	510 m	MPC · JPL
588076	2007 GF_{78}	—	October 17, 2010	Mount Lemmon	Mount Lemmon Survey	·	2.9 km	MPC · JPL
588077	2007 GG_{79}	—	November 2, 2013	Kitt Peak	Spacewatch	·	1.3 km	MPC · JPL
588078	2007 GX_{79}	—	April 15, 2007	Kitt Peak	Spacewatch	·	660 m	MPC · JPL
588079	2007 GK_{81}	—	April 14, 2007	Kitt Peak	Spacewatch	MIS	2.2 km	MPC · JPL
588080	2007 GM_{81}	—	April 15, 2007	Kitt Peak	Spacewatch	·	690 m	MPC · JPL
588081	2007 HZ_{4}	—	April 15, 2007	Kitt Peak	Spacewatch	·	1.1 km	MPC · JPL
588082	2007 HU_{8}	—	April 18, 2007	Mount Lemmon	Mount Lemmon Survey	·	2.5 km	MPC · JPL
588083	2007 HF_{10}	—	March 15, 2007	Kitt Peak	Spacewatch	L5	7.4 km	MPC · JPL
588084	2007 HN_{10}	—	April 18, 2007	Mount Lemmon	Mount Lemmon Survey	·	1.2 km	MPC · JPL
588085	2007 HR_{16}	—	April 16, 2007	Mount Lemmon	Mount Lemmon Survey	T_{j} (2.94)	2.7 km	MPC · JPL
588086	2007 HH_{21}	—	April 18, 2007	Kitt Peak	Spacewatch	(5)	880 m	MPC · JPL
588087	2007 HN_{38}	—	September 12, 2004	Kitt Peak	Spacewatch	·	3.0 km	MPC · JPL
588088	2007 HJ_{43}	—	March 15, 2007	Mount Lemmon	Mount Lemmon Survey	·	620 m	MPC · JPL
588089	2007 HM_{55}	—	April 22, 2007	Kitt Peak	Spacewatch	·	1.8 km	MPC · JPL
588090	2007 HO_{63}	—	April 22, 2007	Mount Lemmon	Mount Lemmon Survey	·	1.6 km	MPC · JPL
588091	2007 HD_{66}	—	April 22, 2007	Mount Lemmon	Mount Lemmon Survey	·	1.7 km	MPC · JPL
588092	2007 HM_{77}	—	April 23, 2007	Kitt Peak	Spacewatch	·	650 m	MPC · JPL
588093	2007 HE_{79}	—	April 23, 2007	Catalina	CSS	·	3.7 km	MPC · JPL
588094	2007 HV_{81}	—	April 25, 2007	Kitt Peak	Spacewatch	·	1.5 km	MPC · JPL
588095	2007 HX_{88}	—	April 22, 2007	Kitt Peak	Spacewatch	·	1.4 km	MPC · JPL
588096	2007 HG_{91}	—	April 18, 2007	Mount Lemmon	Mount Lemmon Survey	·	1.1 km	MPC · JPL
588097	2007 HG_{97}	—	April 22, 2007	Catalina	CSS	JUN	1.1 km	MPC · JPL
588098	2007 HH_{100}	—	April 25, 2007	Mount Lemmon	Mount Lemmon Survey	EOS	1.8 km	MPC · JPL
588099	2007 HK_{101}	—	March 19, 2007	Mount Lemmon	Mount Lemmon Survey	·	2.6 km	MPC · JPL
588100	2007 HW_{101}	—	April 13, 2013	Kitt Peak	Spacewatch	·	2.8 km	MPC · JPL

== 588101–588200 ==
back to top

Designation			Discovery			Properties		Ref
Permanent	Provisional	Named after	Date	Site	Discoverer(s)	Category	Diam.	Ref
588101	2007 HQ_{104}	—	September 22, 2017	Haleakala	Pan-STARRS 1	HNS	760 m	MPC · JPL
588102	2007 HW_{106}	—	April 22, 2007	Kitt Peak	Spacewatch	·	1.4 km	MPC · JPL
588103	2007 HU_{109}	—	March 4, 2017	Haleakala	Pan-STARRS 1	TEL	1.0 km	MPC · JPL
588104	2007 HO_{110}	—	April 25, 2007	Kitt Peak	Spacewatch	·	2.0 km	MPC · JPL
588105	2007 HS_{110}	—	April 18, 2007	Kitt Peak	Spacewatch	EUN	870 m	MPC · JPL
588106	2007 HL_{111}	—	April 22, 2007	Mount Lemmon	Mount Lemmon Survey	·	600 m	MPC · JPL
588107	2007 HU_{111}	—	April 26, 2007	Kitt Peak	Spacewatch	·	1.6 km	MPC · JPL
588108 Boteropop	2007 JX	Boteropop	May 8, 2007	Nogales	J.-C. Merlin	·	3.3 km	MPC · JPL
588109	2007 JF_{8}	—	April 22, 2007	Mount Lemmon	Mount Lemmon Survey	·	1.9 km	MPC · JPL
588110	2007 JN_{19}	—	March 18, 2007	Kitt Peak	Spacewatch	·	1.3 km	MPC · JPL
588111	2007 JV_{24}	—	May 9, 2007	Mount Lemmon	Mount Lemmon Survey	·	1.2 km	MPC · JPL
588112	2007 JN_{30}	—	May 7, 2007	Lulin	LUSS	·	1.6 km	MPC · JPL
588113	2007 JH_{41}	—	May 10, 2007	Kitt Peak	Spacewatch	·	1.3 km	MPC · JPL
588114	2007 JM_{47}	—	September 20, 2011	Kitt Peak	Spacewatch	·	650 m	MPC · JPL
588115	2007 JL_{48}	—	May 13, 2007	Kitt Peak	Spacewatch	H	410 m	MPC · JPL
588116	2007 JZ_{48}	—	March 25, 2007	Mount Lemmon	Mount Lemmon Survey	·	2.3 km	MPC · JPL
588117	2007 JJ_{50}	—	November 27, 2009	Mount Lemmon	Mount Lemmon Survey	(5)	950 m	MPC · JPL
588118	2007 JM_{51}	—	May 13, 2007	Kitt Peak	Spacewatch	·	490 m	MPC · JPL
588119	2007 KS	—	May 16, 2007	Mount Lemmon	Mount Lemmon Survey	·	1.7 km	MPC · JPL
588120	2007 KU_{11}	—	May 25, 2007	Mount Lemmon	Mount Lemmon Survey	·	1.5 km	MPC · JPL
588121	2007 LU_{4}	—	January 23, 2006	Kitt Peak	Spacewatch	HYG	3.0 km	MPC · JPL
588122	2007 LQ_{13}	—	May 13, 2007	Kitt Peak	Spacewatch	ADE	2.0 km	MPC · JPL
588123	2007 LH_{22}	—	June 13, 2007	Kitt Peak	Spacewatch	ADE	2.0 km	MPC · JPL
588124	2007 LQ_{25}	—	June 14, 2007	Kitt Peak	Spacewatch	·	1.8 km	MPC · JPL
588125	2007 LF_{39}	—	February 21, 2013	Haleakala	Pan-STARRS 1	·	750 m	MPC · JPL
588126	2007 MR_{1}	—	April 24, 2007	Mount Lemmon	Mount Lemmon Survey	·	1.4 km	MPC · JPL
588127	2007 MV_{4}	—	May 25, 2007	Mount Lemmon	Mount Lemmon Survey	·	1.6 km	MPC · JPL
588128	2007 MM_{7}	—	May 25, 2007	Mount Lemmon	Mount Lemmon Survey	·	1.4 km	MPC · JPL
588129	2007 MV_{16}	—	May 18, 2007	Kitt Peak	Spacewatch	·	1.3 km	MPC · JPL
588130	2007 MT_{19}	—	June 21, 2007	Mount Lemmon	Mount Lemmon Survey	·	590 m	MPC · JPL
588131	2007 MD_{23}	—	June 22, 2007	Kitt Peak	Spacewatch	·	730 m	MPC · JPL
588132	2007 MC_{28}	—	February 19, 2015	Haleakala	Pan-STARRS 1	HNS	900 m	MPC · JPL
588133	2007 MH_{28}	—	August 11, 2012	Siding Spring	SSS	·	1.8 km	MPC · JPL
588134	2007 MM_{28}	—	January 4, 2013	Kitt Peak	Spacewatch	·	520 m	MPC · JPL
588135	2007 MT_{29}	—	September 5, 2008	Kitt Peak	Spacewatch	·	1.2 km	MPC · JPL
588136	2007 MA_{30}	—	December 24, 2011	Mount Lemmon	Mount Lemmon Survey	L4	8.9 km	MPC · JPL
588137	2007 PG_{2}	—	August 3, 2007	La Silla	Behrend, R.	MAR	1.3 km	MPC · JPL
588138	2007 PW_{4}	—	August 9, 2007	Kitt Peak	Spacewatch	·	1.3 km	MPC · JPL
588139	2007 PT_{19}	—	August 9, 2007	Kitt Peak	Spacewatch	·	700 m	MPC · JPL
588140	2007 PF_{38}	—	August 13, 2007	Siding Spring	SSS	·	1.9 km	MPC · JPL
588141	2007 PD_{51}	—	August 8, 2007	Siding Spring	SSS	H	460 m	MPC · JPL
588142	2007 PR_{53}	—	August 9, 2007	Kitt Peak	Spacewatch	·	2.0 km	MPC · JPL
588143	2007 QG_{5}	—	May 30, 2002	Palomar	NEAT	·	1.8 km	MPC · JPL
588144	2007 QW_{11}	—	August 23, 2007	Kitt Peak	Spacewatch	·	1.8 km	MPC · JPL
588145	2007 RO_{8}	—	September 8, 2007	Eskridge	G. Hug	AGN	1.1 km	MPC · JPL
588146	2007 RV_{18}	—	September 12, 2007	Dauban	F. Kugel, C. Rinner	·	1.9 km	MPC · JPL
588147	2007 RH_{28}	—	September 4, 2007	Catalina	CSS	·	810 m	MPC · JPL
588148	2007 RJ_{30}	—	September 5, 2007	Mount Lemmon	Mount Lemmon Survey	·	1.7 km	MPC · JPL
588149	2007 RV_{39}	—	September 9, 2007	Kitt Peak	Spacewatch	H	470 m	MPC · JPL
588150	2007 RS_{55}	—	September 9, 2007	Kitt Peak	Spacewatch	V	500 m	MPC · JPL
588151	2007 RH_{65}	—	February 7, 2006	Kitt Peak	Spacewatch	·	2.1 km	MPC · JPL
588152	2007 RS_{67}	—	September 10, 2007	Kitt Peak	Spacewatch	HOF	2.0 km	MPC · JPL
588153	2007 RG_{72}	—	September 10, 2007	Kitt Peak	Spacewatch	·	740 m	MPC · JPL
588154	2007 RC_{89}	—	September 10, 2007	Mount Lemmon	Mount Lemmon Survey	MAS	680 m	MPC · JPL
588155	2007 RY_{113}	—	September 11, 2007	Kitt Peak	Spacewatch	·	1.8 km	MPC · JPL
588156	2007 RX_{116}	—	September 11, 2007	Kitt Peak	Spacewatch	(2076)	650 m	MPC · JPL
588157	2007 RY_{133}	—	September 11, 2007	Mount Lemmon	Mount Lemmon Survey	AGN	1.2 km	MPC · JPL
588158	2007 RT_{134}	—	October 25, 2003	Kitt Peak	Spacewatch	·	1.4 km	MPC · JPL
588159	2007 RN_{156}	—	August 24, 2007	Kitt Peak	Spacewatch	·	1.7 km	MPC · JPL
588160	2007 RZ_{158}	—	September 12, 2007	Mount Lemmon	Mount Lemmon Survey	L4	7.2 km	MPC · JPL
588161	2007 RO_{159}	—	September 12, 2007	Mount Lemmon	Mount Lemmon Survey	·	1.3 km	MPC · JPL
588162	2007 RS_{163}	—	September 10, 2007	Kitt Peak	Spacewatch	·	820 m	MPC · JPL
588163	2007 RY_{171}	—	September 10, 2007	Kitt Peak	Spacewatch	AGN	1.2 km	MPC · JPL
588164	2007 RO_{175}	—	September 10, 2007	Kitt Peak	Spacewatch	AGN	950 m	MPC · JPL
588165	2007 RW_{176}	—	September 10, 2007	Mount Lemmon	Mount Lemmon Survey	(2076)	670 m	MPC · JPL
588166	2007 RL_{178}	—	September 10, 2007	Kitt Peak	Spacewatch	V	490 m	MPC · JPL
588167	2007 RQ_{186}	—	September 13, 2007	Mount Lemmon	Mount Lemmon Survey	·	780 m	MPC · JPL
588168	2007 RX_{187}	—	October 19, 2003	Kitt Peak	Spacewatch	·	960 m	MPC · JPL
588169	2007 RZ_{190}	—	September 11, 2007	Kitt Peak	Spacewatch	KOR	1.1 km	MPC · JPL
588170	2007 RR_{211}	—	September 11, 2007	Kitt Peak	Spacewatch	·	1.5 km	MPC · JPL
588171	2007 RK_{214}	—	September 12, 2007	Kitt Peak	Spacewatch	(5)	1.0 km	MPC · JPL
588172	2007 RX_{216}	—	September 10, 2007	Kitt Peak	Spacewatch	·	1.9 km	MPC · JPL
588173	2007 RU_{220}	—	September 14, 2007	Mount Lemmon	Mount Lemmon Survey	·	520 m	MPC · JPL
588174	2007 RX_{254}	—	February 25, 2006	Mount Lemmon	Mount Lemmon Survey	EUN	950 m	MPC · JPL
588175	2007 RN_{263}	—	July 18, 2007	Mount Lemmon	Mount Lemmon Survey	·	2.0 km	MPC · JPL
588176	2007 RJ_{264}	—	September 15, 2007	Mount Lemmon	Mount Lemmon Survey	L4	7.4 km	MPC · JPL
588177	2007 RR_{266}	—	September 14, 2007	Anderson Mesa	LONEOS	·	640 m	MPC · JPL
588178	2007 RJ_{272}	—	September 15, 2007	Kitt Peak	Spacewatch	·	2.2 km	MPC · JPL
588179	2007 RF_{290}	—	September 9, 2007	Kitt Peak	Spacewatch	·	530 m	MPC · JPL
588180	2007 RK_{302}	—	September 14, 2007	Catalina	CSS	·	2.0 km	MPC · JPL
588181	2007 RH_{319}	—	September 12, 2007	Anderson Mesa	LONEOS	·	670 m	MPC · JPL
588182	2007 RL_{329}	—	September 3, 2007	Catalina	CSS	·	810 m	MPC · JPL
588183	2007 RF_{331}	—	September 12, 2007	Mount Lemmon	Mount Lemmon Survey	·	500 m	MPC · JPL
588184	2007 RF_{333}	—	September 14, 2007	Kitt Peak	Spacewatch	MAS	680 m	MPC · JPL
588185	2007 RG_{333}	—	September 14, 2007	Kitt Peak	Spacewatch	·	2.0 km	MPC · JPL
588186	2007 RC_{334}	—	September 10, 2007	Mount Lemmon	Mount Lemmon Survey	·	1.8 km	MPC · JPL
588187	2007 RE_{335}	—	October 10, 2012	Haleakala	Pan-STARRS 1	·	2.0 km	MPC · JPL
588188	2007 RX_{338}	—	January 10, 2013	Haleakala	Pan-STARRS 1	L4	8.6 km	MPC · JPL
588189	2007 RL_{342}	—	September 11, 2007	Kitt Peak	Spacewatch	NYS	710 m	MPC · JPL
588190	2007 RO_{343}	—	September 14, 2007	Mount Lemmon	Mount Lemmon Survey	KOR	1.0 km	MPC · JPL
588191	2007 RZ_{350}	—	September 21, 2012	Kitt Peak	Spacewatch	AGN	870 m	MPC · JPL
588192	2007 RJ_{351}	—	January 25, 2014	Haleakala	Pan-STARRS 1	·	1.7 km	MPC · JPL
588193	2007 RJ_{355}	—	September 12, 2007	Mount Lemmon	Mount Lemmon Survey	V	600 m	MPC · JPL
588194	2007 RK_{356}	—	September 12, 2007	Mount Lemmon	Mount Lemmon Survey	KOR	1.1 km	MPC · JPL
588195	2007 RE_{357}	—	September 10, 2007	Kitt Peak	Spacewatch	·	1.8 km	MPC · JPL
588196	2007 RQ_{366}	—	September 11, 2007	Mount Lemmon	Mount Lemmon Survey	L4	7.1 km	MPC · JPL
588197	2007 SF_{2}	—	September 15, 2007	Lulin	LUSS	·	2.3 km	MPC · JPL
588198	2007 SW_{7}	—	September 18, 2007	Kitt Peak	Spacewatch	·	560 m	MPC · JPL
588199	2007 SZ_{24}	—	September 26, 2007	Mount Lemmon	Mount Lemmon Survey	·	1.4 km	MPC · JPL
588200	2007 SF_{25}	—	September 9, 2007	Kitt Peak	Spacewatch	NYS	890 m	MPC · JPL

== 588201–588300 ==
back to top

Designation			Discovery			Properties		Ref
Permanent	Provisional	Named after	Date	Site	Discoverer(s)	Category	Diam.	Ref
588201	2007 SN_{25}	—	September 18, 2007	Kitt Peak	Spacewatch	·	1.4 km	MPC · JPL
588202	2007 SP_{25}	—	March 19, 2001	Apache Point	SDSS Collaboration	L4	10 km	MPC · JPL
588203	2007 SF_{26}	—	September 26, 2007	Mount Lemmon	Mount Lemmon Survey	·	3.0 km	MPC · JPL
588204	2007 SV_{27}	—	September 18, 2007	Mount Lemmon	Mount Lemmon Survey	·	700 m	MPC · JPL
588205	2007 SA_{28}	—	September 19, 2007	Kitt Peak	Spacewatch	H	390 m	MPC · JPL
588206	2007 SF_{29}	—	September 19, 2007	Kitt Peak	Spacewatch	·	1.0 km	MPC · JPL
588207	2007 SK_{29}	—	September 24, 2007	Kitt Peak	Spacewatch	KOR	900 m	MPC · JPL
588208	2007 TQ_{6}	—	October 6, 2007	Dauban	F. Kugel, C. Rinner	·	2.0 km	MPC · JPL
588209	2007 TT_{13}	—	October 6, 2007	Bergisch Gladbach	W. Bickel	L4	8.6 km	MPC · JPL
588210	2007 TA_{16}	—	October 6, 2007	Charleston	R. Holmes	·	660 m	MPC · JPL
588211	2007 TJ_{44}	—	October 7, 2007	Kitt Peak	Spacewatch	·	880 m	MPC · JPL
588212	2007 TY_{49}	—	October 4, 2007	Kitt Peak	Spacewatch	·	640 m	MPC · JPL
588213	2007 TX_{63}	—	October 7, 2007	Mount Lemmon	Mount Lemmon Survey	·	700 m	MPC · JPL
588214	2007 TV_{71}	—	October 13, 2007	Bergisch Gladbach	W. Bickel	·	740 m	MPC · JPL
588215	2007 TK_{85}	—	October 8, 2007	Mount Lemmon	Mount Lemmon Survey	·	1.5 km	MPC · JPL
588216	2007 TU_{92}	—	November 14, 1998	Kitt Peak	Spacewatch	AGN	1.3 km	MPC · JPL
588217	2007 TY_{99}	—	October 8, 2007	Kitt Peak	Spacewatch	V	480 m	MPC · JPL
588218	2007 TR_{120}	—	October 4, 2007	Kitt Peak	Spacewatch	·	2.2 km	MPC · JPL
588219	2007 TG_{167}	—	October 12, 2007	Socorro	LINEAR	·	1.8 km	MPC · JPL
588220	2007 TY_{174}	—	October 4, 2007	Kitt Peak	Spacewatch	·	800 m	MPC · JPL
588221	2007 TO_{177}	—	October 6, 2007	Kitt Peak	Spacewatch	KOR	1.1 km	MPC · JPL
588222	2007 TM_{195}	—	October 7, 2007	Mount Lemmon	Mount Lemmon Survey	·	2.1 km	MPC · JPL
588223	2007 TL_{197}	—	August 24, 2007	Kitt Peak	Spacewatch	·	1.1 km	MPC · JPL
588224	2007 TW_{198}	—	April 2, 2005	Mount Lemmon	Mount Lemmon Survey	AGN	1.3 km	MPC · JPL
588225	2007 TA_{201}	—	October 8, 2007	Kitt Peak	Spacewatch	·	1.5 km	MPC · JPL
588226	2007 TF_{225}	—	October 11, 2007	Kitt Peak	Spacewatch	·	1.7 km	MPC · JPL
588227	2007 TR_{228}	—	October 8, 2007	Kitt Peak	Spacewatch	V	540 m	MPC · JPL
588228	2007 TQ_{238}	—	October 10, 2007	Mount Lemmon	Mount Lemmon Survey	·	1.4 km	MPC · JPL
588229	2007 TJ_{243}	—	October 8, 2007	Catalina	CSS	·	1.6 km	MPC · JPL
588230	2007 TW_{247}	—	October 10, 2007	Kitt Peak	Spacewatch	HOF	2.7 km	MPC · JPL
588231	2007 TV_{250}	—	October 11, 2007	Mount Lemmon	Mount Lemmon Survey	HOF	2.7 km	MPC · JPL
588232	2007 TC_{258}	—	September 13, 2007	Mount Lemmon	Mount Lemmon Survey	·	1.6 km	MPC · JPL
588233	2007 TY_{258}	—	September 14, 2007	Mount Lemmon	Mount Lemmon Survey	·	1.9 km	MPC · JPL
588234	2007 TH_{260}	—	September 14, 2007	Mount Lemmon	Mount Lemmon Survey	·	830 m	MPC · JPL
588235	2007 TC_{261}	—	October 10, 2007	Kitt Peak	Spacewatch	·	1.7 km	MPC · JPL
588236	2007 TM_{264}	—	October 11, 2007	Kitt Peak	Spacewatch	·	1.5 km	MPC · JPL
588237	2007 TM_{267}	—	October 9, 2007	Kitt Peak	Spacewatch	AGN	1.2 km	MPC · JPL
588238	2007 TV_{271}	—	October 9, 2007	Kitt Peak	Spacewatch	·	540 m	MPC · JPL
588239	2007 TR_{276}	—	October 11, 2007	Mount Lemmon	Mount Lemmon Survey	·	2.0 km	MPC · JPL
588240	2007 TK_{292}	—	October 12, 2007	Mount Lemmon	Mount Lemmon Survey	·	1.9 km	MPC · JPL
588241	2007 TB_{298}	—	September 14, 2007	Mount Lemmon	Mount Lemmon Survey	·	1.3 km	MPC · JPL
588242	2007 TQ_{300}	—	October 12, 2007	Kitt Peak	Spacewatch	·	1.6 km	MPC · JPL
588243	2007 TP_{306}	—	May 9, 2006	Mount Lemmon	Mount Lemmon Survey	AGN	1.3 km	MPC · JPL
588244	2007 TA_{312}	—	October 11, 2007	Mount Lemmon	Mount Lemmon Survey	KOR	1.4 km	MPC · JPL
588245	2007 TD_{317}	—	October 12, 2007	Kitt Peak	Spacewatch	·	2.6 km	MPC · JPL
588246	2007 TG_{319}	—	October 12, 2007	Kitt Peak	Spacewatch	·	1.5 km	MPC · JPL
588247	2007 TF_{330}	—	October 11, 2007	Kitt Peak	Spacewatch	·	830 m	MPC · JPL
588248	2007 TV_{336}	—	August 23, 2007	Kitt Peak	Spacewatch	AGN	1.2 km	MPC · JPL
588249	2007 TU_{339}	—	September 11, 2007	Mount Lemmon	Mount Lemmon Survey	·	1.8 km	MPC · JPL
588250	2007 TJ_{341}	—	October 9, 2007	Mount Lemmon	Mount Lemmon Survey	KOR	1.1 km	MPC · JPL
588251	2007 TZ_{347}	—	October 15, 2007	Mount Lemmon	Mount Lemmon Survey	·	2.0 km	MPC · JPL
588252	2007 TJ_{351}	—	September 13, 2007	Mount Lemmon	Mount Lemmon Survey	·	2.6 km	MPC · JPL
588253	2007 TH_{360}	—	February 12, 2002	Kitt Peak	Spacewatch	V	610 m	MPC · JPL
588254	2007 TP_{360}	—	October 15, 2007	Mount Lemmon	Mount Lemmon Survey	·	950 m	MPC · JPL
588255 Hantang	2007 TQ_{376}	Hantang	September 21, 2007	XuYi	PMO NEO Survey Program	·	660 m	MPC · JPL
588256	2007 TR_{377}	—	October 11, 2007	Kitt Peak	Spacewatch	·	1.4 km	MPC · JPL
588257	2007 TB_{390}	—	October 14, 2007	Kitt Peak	Spacewatch	·	770 m	MPC · JPL
588258	2007 TP_{396}	—	October 15, 2007	Kitt Peak	Spacewatch	HOF	2.5 km	MPC · JPL
588259	2007 TE_{438}	—	October 13, 2007	Kitt Peak	Spacewatch	·	1.4 km	MPC · JPL
588260	2007 TB_{443}	—	October 11, 2007	Catalina	CSS	·	2.1 km	MPC · JPL
588261	2007 TG_{445}	—	October 15, 2007	Mount Lemmon	Mount Lemmon Survey	·	690 m	MPC · JPL
588262	2007 TG_{449}	—	October 9, 2007	Kitt Peak	Spacewatch	V	640 m	MPC · JPL
588263	2007 TB_{460}	—	September 24, 2008	Kitt Peak	Spacewatch	L4	8.2 km	MPC · JPL
588264	2007 TG_{460}	—	April 10, 2002	Socorro	LINEAR	NYS	990 m	MPC · JPL
588265	2007 TH_{460}	—	October 9, 2007	Kitt Peak	Spacewatch	·	1.8 km	MPC · JPL
588266	2007 TR_{461}	—	October 10, 2007	Kitt Peak	Spacewatch	GEF	1.1 km	MPC · JPL
588267	2007 TO_{462}	—	October 12, 2007	Kitt Peak	Spacewatch	·	570 m	MPC · JPL
588268	2007 TB_{463}	—	October 10, 2007	Kitt Peak	Spacewatch	·	1.4 km	MPC · JPL
588269	2007 TL_{463}	—	April 15, 2013	Haleakala	Pan-STARRS 1	·	820 m	MPC · JPL
588270	2007 TA_{467}	—	February 26, 2014	Haleakala	Pan-STARRS 1	·	1.4 km	MPC · JPL
588271	2007 TE_{467}	—	January 1, 2012	Mount Lemmon	Mount Lemmon Survey	V	540 m	MPC · JPL
588272	2007 TM_{467}	—	January 20, 2014	Mount Lemmon	Mount Lemmon Survey	KOR	1.1 km	MPC · JPL
588273	2007 TH_{469}	—	October 12, 2007	Mount Lemmon	Mount Lemmon Survey	·	1.7 km	MPC · JPL
588274	2007 TT_{470}	—	April 8, 2010	Mount Lemmon	Mount Lemmon Survey	·	1.7 km	MPC · JPL
588275	2007 TX_{473}	—	October 7, 2007	Mount Lemmon	Mount Lemmon Survey	·	2.0 km	MPC · JPL
588276	2007 TA_{474}	—	October 15, 2007	Kitt Peak	Spacewatch	·	1.8 km	MPC · JPL
588277	2007 TF_{474}	—	December 29, 2008	Kitt Peak	Spacewatch	KOR	1.2 km	MPC · JPL
588278	2007 TV_{478}	—	October 17, 2012	Mount Lemmon	Mount Lemmon Survey	KOR	970 m	MPC · JPL
588279	2007 TT_{479}	—	October 7, 2007	Mount Lemmon	Mount Lemmon Survey	·	1.5 km	MPC · JPL
588280	2007 TC_{481}	—	October 10, 2007	Mount Lemmon	Mount Lemmon Survey	KOR	1.2 km	MPC · JPL
588281	2007 TO_{481}	—	October 10, 2007	Mount Lemmon	Mount Lemmon Survey	AGN	1.1 km	MPC · JPL
588282	2007 TQ_{481}	—	October 9, 2007	Mount Lemmon	Mount Lemmon Survey	·	1.1 km	MPC · JPL
588283	2007 TX_{483}	—	October 12, 2007	Kitt Peak	Spacewatch	MAS	390 m	MPC · JPL
588284	2007 TM_{484}	—	October 4, 2007	Kitt Peak	Spacewatch	·	1.7 km	MPC · JPL
588285	2007 TO_{491}	—	October 7, 2007	Mount Lemmon	Mount Lemmon Survey	·	930 m	MPC · JPL
588286	2007 UE_{12}	—	September 18, 2003	Palomar	NEAT	·	1.4 km	MPC · JPL
588287	2007 UD_{27}	—	October 16, 2007	Mount Lemmon	Mount Lemmon Survey	·	1.6 km	MPC · JPL
588288	2007 US_{30}	—	October 19, 2007	Catalina	CSS	·	1.9 km	MPC · JPL
588289	2007 UF_{44}	—	October 9, 2007	Kitt Peak	Spacewatch	·	800 m	MPC · JPL
588290	2007 UV_{47}	—	October 19, 2007	Lulin	LUSS	H	730 m	MPC · JPL
588291	2007 UU_{68}	—	October 30, 2007	Mount Lemmon	Mount Lemmon Survey	·	1.3 km	MPC · JPL
588292	2007 UU_{110}	—	October 12, 2007	Kitt Peak	Spacewatch	·	1.6 km	MPC · JPL
588293	2007 UE_{118}	—	October 8, 2007	Kitt Peak	Spacewatch	·	1.8 km	MPC · JPL
588294	2007 UB_{131}	—	October 20, 2007	Mount Lemmon	Mount Lemmon Survey	·	1.7 km	MPC · JPL
588295	2007 UA_{144}	—	October 17, 2007	Mount Lemmon	Mount Lemmon Survey	V	510 m	MPC · JPL
588296	2007 UW_{146}	—	October 17, 2012	Haleakala	Pan-STARRS 1	KOR	950 m	MPC · JPL
588297	2007 UE_{148}	—	October 20, 2007	Mount Lemmon	Mount Lemmon Survey	·	1.6 km	MPC · JPL
588298	2007 UV_{151}	—	October 24, 2007	Mount Lemmon	Mount Lemmon Survey	·	2.1 km	MPC · JPL
588299	2007 UN_{153}	—	December 8, 2012	Mount Lemmon	Mount Lemmon Survey	·	1.5 km	MPC · JPL
588300	2007 UP_{155}	—	October 16, 2007	Mount Lemmon	Mount Lemmon Survey	·	600 m	MPC · JPL

== 588301–588400 ==
back to top

Designation			Discovery			Properties		Ref
Permanent	Provisional	Named after	Date	Site	Discoverer(s)	Category	Diam.	Ref
588301	2007 UE_{156}	—	October 20, 2007	Mount Lemmon	Mount Lemmon Survey	KOR	1.2 km	MPC · JPL
588302	2007 UL_{158}	—	October 21, 2007	Mount Lemmon	Mount Lemmon Survey	·	1.2 km	MPC · JPL
588303	2007 UN_{158}	—	October 18, 2007	Mount Lemmon	Mount Lemmon Survey	·	1.5 km	MPC · JPL
588304	2007 UT_{161}	—	October 20, 2007	Mount Lemmon	Mount Lemmon Survey	·	1.6 km	MPC · JPL
588305	2007 VR_{10}	—	October 9, 2007	Kitt Peak	Spacewatch	·	1.8 km	MPC · JPL
588306	2007 VQ_{14}	—	October 8, 2007	Kitt Peak	Spacewatch	AGN	1.2 km	MPC · JPL
588307	2007 VH_{16}	—	November 1, 2007	Kitt Peak	Spacewatch	AGN	1.1 km	MPC · JPL
588308	2007 VF_{23}	—	October 12, 2007	Kitt Peak	Spacewatch	·	2.0 km	MPC · JPL
588309	2007 VK_{24}	—	October 8, 2007	Mount Lemmon	Mount Lemmon Survey	·	1.5 km	MPC · JPL
588310	2007 VB_{31}	—	November 2, 2007	Kitt Peak	Spacewatch	·	1.7 km	MPC · JPL
588311	2007 VA_{70}	—	October 8, 2007	Mount Lemmon	Mount Lemmon Survey	·	1.5 km	MPC · JPL
588312	2007 VC_{90}	—	October 19, 2007	Lulin	LUSS	·	2.5 km	MPC · JPL
588313	2007 VG_{99}	—	October 8, 2007	Mount Lemmon	Mount Lemmon Survey	NYS	940 m	MPC · JPL
588314	2007 VN_{109}	—	November 3, 2007	Kitt Peak	Spacewatch	·	670 m	MPC · JPL
588315	2007 VU_{111}	—	November 3, 2007	Kitt Peak	Spacewatch	·	940 m	MPC · JPL
588316	2007 VL_{117}	—	November 3, 2007	Kitt Peak	Spacewatch	·	930 m	MPC · JPL
588317	2007 VU_{127}	—	November 1, 2007	Mount Lemmon	Mount Lemmon Survey	·	740 m	MPC · JPL
588318	2007 VF_{128}	—	November 1, 2007	Mount Lemmon	Mount Lemmon Survey	KOR	880 m	MPC · JPL
588319	2007 VS_{140}	—	August 28, 2003	Palomar	NEAT	·	990 m	MPC · JPL
588320	2007 VQ_{144}	—	November 4, 2007	Kitt Peak	Spacewatch	·	2.2 km	MPC · JPL
588321	2007 VT_{151}	—	March 25, 2006	Kitt Peak	Spacewatch	·	740 m	MPC · JPL
588322	2007 VQ_{154}	—	October 9, 2007	Kitt Peak	Spacewatch	·	1.8 km	MPC · JPL
588323	2007 VR_{158}	—	November 5, 2007	Kitt Peak	Spacewatch	·	1.3 km	MPC · JPL
588324	2007 VQ_{169}	—	November 5, 2007	Kitt Peak	Spacewatch	KOR	1.3 km	MPC · JPL
588325	2007 VE_{174}	—	November 3, 2007	Mount Lemmon	Mount Lemmon Survey	H	480 m	MPC · JPL
588326	2007 VN_{178}	—	October 6, 2007	Kitt Peak	Spacewatch	·	970 m	MPC · JPL
588327	2007 VZ_{187}	—	November 13, 2007	Catalina	CSS	H	500 m	MPC · JPL
588328	2007 VY_{209}	—	November 8, 2007	Kitt Peak	Spacewatch	·	1.3 km	MPC · JPL
588329	2007 VH_{229}	—	November 7, 2007	Kitt Peak	Spacewatch	·	1.0 km	MPC · JPL
588330	2007 VA_{246}	—	July 14, 1997	Kitt Peak	Spacewatch	·	2.2 km	MPC · JPL
588331	2007 VU_{252}	—	October 20, 2007	Mount Lemmon	Mount Lemmon Survey	·	2.4 km	MPC · JPL
588332	2007 VC_{257}	—	November 2, 2007	Mount Lemmon	Mount Lemmon Survey	·	820 m	MPC · JPL
588333	2007 VO_{263}	—	November 1, 2007	Kitt Peak	Spacewatch	·	1.2 km	MPC · JPL
588334	2007 VS_{279}	—	November 3, 2007	Kitt Peak	Spacewatch	KOR	1.1 km	MPC · JPL
588335	2007 VU_{286}	—	November 14, 2007	Kitt Peak	Spacewatch	KOR	1.5 km	MPC · JPL
588336	2007 VZ_{287}	—	November 2, 2007	Kitt Peak	Spacewatch	·	810 m	MPC · JPL
588337	2007 VO_{291}	—	November 2, 2007	Kitt Peak	Spacewatch	KOR	1.1 km	MPC · JPL
588338	2007 VU_{317}	—	January 13, 2018	Mount Lemmon	Mount Lemmon Survey	·	1.7 km	MPC · JPL
588339	2007 VJ_{327}	—	September 10, 2002	Palomar	NEAT	GEF	1.3 km	MPC · JPL
588340	2007 VK_{342}	—	November 2, 2007	Kitt Peak	Spacewatch	·	2.0 km	MPC · JPL
588341	2007 VN_{342}	—	November 12, 2007	Catalina	CSS	DOR	2.1 km	MPC · JPL
588342	2007 VK_{344}	—	April 4, 2014	Mount Lemmon	Mount Lemmon Survey	·	1.6 km	MPC · JPL
588343	2007 VQ_{344}	—	February 9, 2016	Haleakala	Pan-STARRS 1	V	490 m	MPC · JPL
588344	2007 VU_{351}	—	November 7, 2007	Kitt Peak	Spacewatch	·	780 m	MPC · JPL
588345	2007 VJ_{354}	—	September 3, 2016	Mount Lemmon	Mount Lemmon Survey	KOR	1.1 km	MPC · JPL
588346	2007 VN_{368}	—	November 8, 2007	Kitt Peak	Spacewatch	KOR	1.1 km	MPC · JPL
588347	2007 VB_{371}	—	November 1, 2007	Mount Lemmon	Mount Lemmon Survey	·	1.3 km	MPC · JPL
588348	2007 WU_{1}	—	November 17, 2007	Saint-Sulpice	B. Christophe	NYS	840 m	MPC · JPL
588349	2007 WZ_{18}	—	November 18, 2007	Mount Lemmon	Mount Lemmon Survey	·	1.1 km	MPC · JPL
588350	2007 WC_{22}	—	November 17, 2007	Kitt Peak	Spacewatch	·	1.6 km	MPC · JPL
588351	2007 WL_{32}	—	January 17, 2004	Kitt Peak	Spacewatch	·	2.5 km	MPC · JPL
588352	2007 WE_{33}	—	November 8, 2007	Kitt Peak	Spacewatch	·	2.7 km	MPC · JPL
588353	2007 WJ_{36}	—	November 19, 2007	Mount Lemmon	Mount Lemmon Survey	·	690 m	MPC · JPL
588354	2007 WK_{36}	—	November 2, 2007	Kitt Peak	Spacewatch	·	2.2 km	MPC · JPL
588355	2007 WW_{36}	—	August 25, 2003	Palomar	NEAT	·	860 m	MPC · JPL
588356	2007 WY_{37}	—	November 19, 2007	Mount Lemmon	Mount Lemmon Survey	·	1.8 km	MPC · JPL
588357	2007 WZ_{71}	—	November 18, 2007	Mount Lemmon	Mount Lemmon Survey	·	1.0 km	MPC · JPL
588358	2007 WS_{73}	—	November 20, 2007	Kitt Peak	Spacewatch	·	1.3 km	MPC · JPL
588359	2007 XZ_{11}	—	November 4, 2007	Kitt Peak	Spacewatch	AGN	1.1 km	MPC · JPL
588360	2007 XU_{12}	—	December 4, 2007	Kitt Peak	Spacewatch	HOF	2.3 km	MPC · JPL
588361	2007 XR_{23}	—	September 15, 2007	Mount Lemmon	Mount Lemmon Survey	KOR	1.6 km	MPC · JPL
588362	2007 XB_{27}	—	December 14, 2007	Kitt Peak	Spacewatch	·	1.9 km	MPC · JPL
588363	2007 XT_{47}	—	November 6, 2007	Mount Lemmon	Mount Lemmon Survey	·	2.0 km	MPC · JPL
588364	2007 XW_{49}	—	May 8, 2005	Mount Lemmon	Mount Lemmon Survey	MAS	810 m	MPC · JPL
588365	2007 XP_{61}	—	February 26, 2014	Haleakala	Pan-STARRS 1	(16286)	2.0 km	MPC · JPL
588366	2007 XM_{62}	—	December 3, 2012	Mount Lemmon	Mount Lemmon Survey	·	1.5 km	MPC · JPL
588367	2007 XO_{62}	—	December 4, 2007	Kitt Peak	Spacewatch	·	2.0 km	MPC · JPL
588368	2007 XA_{69}	—	December 15, 2007	Mount Lemmon	Mount Lemmon Survey	·	1.8 km	MPC · JPL
588369	2007 YY_{28}	—	December 5, 2007	Kitt Peak	Spacewatch	·	1.0 km	MPC · JPL
588370	2007 YO_{44}	—	December 30, 2007	Kitt Peak	Spacewatch	·	2.6 km	MPC · JPL
588371	2007 YX_{68}	—	December 16, 2007	Mount Lemmon	Mount Lemmon Survey	·	1.4 km	MPC · JPL
588372	2007 YV_{71}	—	December 30, 2007	Mount Lemmon	Mount Lemmon Survey	·	890 m	MPC · JPL
588373	2007 YH_{76}	—	December 16, 2007	Mount Lemmon	Mount Lemmon Survey	NAE	1.7 km	MPC · JPL
588374	2007 YV_{76}	—	December 18, 2007	Mount Lemmon	Mount Lemmon Survey	·	1.6 km	MPC · JPL
588375	2007 YX_{77}	—	October 10, 2016	Mount Lemmon	Mount Lemmon Survey	·	2.6 km	MPC · JPL
588376	2007 YJ_{78}	—	December 24, 1992	Kitt Peak	Spacewatch	·	1.9 km	MPC · JPL
588377	2007 YF_{79}	—	November 19, 2007	Kitt Peak	Spacewatch	V	480 m	MPC · JPL
588378	2007 YP_{79}	—	December 22, 2012	Haleakala	Pan-STARRS 1	·	1.9 km	MPC · JPL
588379	2007 YQ_{79}	—	August 26, 2011	Piszkéstető	K. Sárneczky	·	1.8 km	MPC · JPL
588380	2007 YS_{80}	—	November 19, 2007	Kitt Peak	Spacewatch	·	1.4 km	MPC · JPL
588381	2007 YF_{84}	—	March 7, 2014	Kitt Peak	Spacewatch	·	1.8 km	MPC · JPL
588382	2007 YO_{86}	—	March 24, 2014	Haleakala	Pan-STARRS 1	·	2.0 km	MPC · JPL
588383	2007 YS_{87}	—	February 13, 2012	Haleakala	Pan-STARRS 1	·	770 m	MPC · JPL
588384	2007 YR_{89}	—	December 30, 2007	Kitt Peak	Spacewatch	·	620 m	MPC · JPL
588385	2007 YT_{90}	—	December 30, 2007	Mount Lemmon	Mount Lemmon Survey	·	740 m	MPC · JPL
588386	2007 YU_{90}	—	December 30, 2007	Mount Lemmon	Mount Lemmon Survey	·	1.5 km	MPC · JPL
588387	2007 YN_{91}	—	December 18, 2007	Mount Lemmon	Mount Lemmon Survey	·	1.0 km	MPC · JPL
588388	2007 YA_{93}	—	December 16, 2007	Mount Lemmon	Mount Lemmon Survey	·	2.3 km	MPC · JPL
588389	2008 AY_{9}	—	January 10, 2008	Mount Lemmon	Mount Lemmon Survey	NYS	930 m	MPC · JPL
588390	2008 AU_{17}	—	November 19, 2007	Mount Lemmon	Mount Lemmon Survey	EOS	1.7 km	MPC · JPL
588391	2008 AX_{17}	—	January 10, 2008	Kitt Peak	Spacewatch	·	520 m	MPC · JPL
588392	2008 AF_{22}	—	September 24, 2006	Kitt Peak	Spacewatch	·	1.4 km	MPC · JPL
588393	2008 AB_{26}	—	January 10, 2008	Mount Lemmon	Mount Lemmon Survey	·	2.1 km	MPC · JPL
588394	2008 AN_{48}	—	November 18, 2007	Kitt Peak	Spacewatch	·	840 m	MPC · JPL
588395	2008 AX_{54}	—	January 11, 2008	Kitt Peak	Spacewatch	·	1.1 km	MPC · JPL
588396	2008 AL_{60}	—	January 11, 2008	Kitt Peak	Spacewatch	·	1.5 km	MPC · JPL
588397	2008 AB_{64}	—	January 11, 2008	Kitt Peak	Spacewatch	EOS	1.6 km	MPC · JPL
588398	2008 AF_{67}	—	January 11, 2008	Kitt Peak	Spacewatch	·	1.8 km	MPC · JPL
588399	2008 AN_{75}	—	April 30, 2005	Kitt Peak	Spacewatch	·	800 m	MPC · JPL
588400	2008 AP_{85}	—	January 13, 2008	Kitt Peak	Spacewatch	·	2.0 km	MPC · JPL

== 588401–588500 ==
back to top

Designation			Discovery			Properties		Ref
Permanent	Provisional	Named after	Date	Site	Discoverer(s)	Category	Diam.	Ref
588401	2008 AP_{87}	—	December 30, 2007	Kitt Peak	Spacewatch	·	1.6 km	MPC · JPL
588402	2008 AW_{87}	—	January 13, 2008	Kitt Peak	Spacewatch	·	850 m	MPC · JPL
588403	2008 AP_{92}	—	January 1, 2008	Kitt Peak	Spacewatch	·	2.2 km	MPC · JPL
588404	2008 AT_{94}	—	October 21, 2003	Kitt Peak	Spacewatch	·	690 m	MPC · JPL
588405	2008 AF_{96}	—	November 11, 2007	Mount Lemmon	Mount Lemmon Survey	V	560 m	MPC · JPL
588406	2008 AS_{109}	—	January 15, 2008	Kitt Peak	Spacewatch	·	920 m	MPC · JPL
588407	2008 AJ_{120}	—	January 6, 2008	Mauna Kea	P. A. Wiegert	·	1.8 km	MPC · JPL
588408	2008 AX_{120}	—	January 6, 2008	Mauna Kea	P. A. Wiegert	·	990 m	MPC · JPL
588409	2008 AQ_{130}	—	January 30, 2008	Mount Lemmon	Mount Lemmon Survey	·	1.4 km	MPC · JPL
588410	2008 AQ_{139}	—	January 11, 2008	Mount Lemmon	Mount Lemmon Survey	·	900 m	MPC · JPL
588411	2008 AA_{140}	—	January 15, 2008	Mount Lemmon	Mount Lemmon Survey	·	1.3 km	MPC · JPL
588412	2008 AO_{140}	—	January 13, 2008	Mount Lemmon	Mount Lemmon Survey	·	1.5 km	MPC · JPL
588413	2008 AO_{141}	—	January 1, 2008	Kitt Peak	Spacewatch	·	1.9 km	MPC · JPL
588414	2008 AN_{143}	—	January 11, 2008	Kitt Peak	Spacewatch	EOS	1.4 km	MPC · JPL
588415	2008 AR_{144}	—	September 25, 2016	Haleakala	Pan-STARRS 1	·	2.0 km	MPC · JPL
588416	2008 AQ_{151}	—	January 15, 2008	Kitt Peak	Spacewatch	·	830 m	MPC · JPL
588417	2008 AJ_{155}	—	January 1, 2008	Kitt Peak	Spacewatch	EOS	1.6 km	MPC · JPL
588418	2008 BU_{14}	—	January 28, 2008	Altschwendt	W. Ries	·	1.7 km	MPC · JPL
588419	2008 BC_{18}	—	January 30, 2008	Mount Lemmon	Mount Lemmon Survey	·	2.3 km	MPC · JPL
588420	2008 BG_{28}	—	January 30, 2008	Mount Lemmon	Mount Lemmon Survey	THM	1.7 km	MPC · JPL
588421	2008 BX_{59}	—	January 18, 2008	Mount Lemmon	Mount Lemmon Survey	·	920 m	MPC · JPL
588422	2008 BZ_{59}	—	January 18, 2008	Mount Lemmon	Mount Lemmon Survey	EOS	1.5 km	MPC · JPL
588423	2008 CK_{2}	—	November 16, 2003	Catalina	CSS	·	960 m	MPC · JPL
588424	2008 CD_{9}	—	February 2, 2008	Mount Lemmon	Mount Lemmon Survey	·	2.4 km	MPC · JPL
588425	2008 CK_{26}	—	December 6, 2007	Mount Lemmon	Mount Lemmon Survey	EOS	2.0 km	MPC · JPL
588426	2008 CY_{34}	—	February 2, 2008	Kitt Peak	Spacewatch	·	1.4 km	MPC · JPL
588427	2008 CH_{35}	—	February 2, 2008	Kitt Peak	Spacewatch	·	2.2 km	MPC · JPL
588428	2008 CS_{42}	—	February 2, 2008	Kitt Peak	Spacewatch	·	2.2 km	MPC · JPL
588429	2008 CX_{48}	—	December 19, 2007	Mount Lemmon	Mount Lemmon Survey	PHO	1.2 km	MPC · JPL
588430	2008 CL_{56}	—	February 7, 2008	Mount Lemmon	Mount Lemmon Survey	EOS	1.5 km	MPC · JPL
588431	2008 CU_{58}	—	February 7, 2008	Mount Lemmon	Mount Lemmon Survey	EOS	1.3 km	MPC · JPL
588432	2008 CM_{66}	—	February 8, 2008	Mount Lemmon	Mount Lemmon Survey	·	2.1 km	MPC · JPL
588433	2008 CC_{79}	—	February 14, 2004	Kitt Peak	Spacewatch	·	860 m	MPC · JPL
588434	2008 CN_{80}	—	February 7, 2008	Kitt Peak	Spacewatch	·	1.8 km	MPC · JPL
588435	2008 CU_{82}	—	January 13, 2008	Kitt Peak	Spacewatch	·	1.6 km	MPC · JPL
588436	2008 CK_{98}	—	August 31, 2005	Kitt Peak	Spacewatch	EOS	1.8 km	MPC · JPL
588437	2008 CH_{114}	—	February 10, 2008	Kitt Peak	Spacewatch	·	1.1 km	MPC · JPL
588438	2008 CP_{114}	—	February 10, 2008	Mount Lemmon	Mount Lemmon Survey	·	1.3 km	MPC · JPL
588439	2008 CB_{122}	—	February 7, 2008	Mount Lemmon	Mount Lemmon Survey	·	820 m	MPC · JPL
588440	2008 CT_{125}	—	February 12, 2008	Kitt Peak	Spacewatch	·	2.6 km	MPC · JPL
588441	2008 CF_{127}	—	February 8, 2008	Kitt Peak	Spacewatch	·	2.0 km	MPC · JPL
588442	2008 CL_{127}	—	January 30, 2008	Mount Lemmon	Mount Lemmon Survey	MAS	540 m	MPC · JPL
588443	2008 CT_{134}	—	February 8, 2008	Mount Lemmon	Mount Lemmon Survey	NYS	750 m	MPC · JPL
588444	2008 CS_{141}	—	February 8, 2008	Kitt Peak	Spacewatch	·	660 m	MPC · JPL
588445	2008 CJ_{154}	—	February 9, 2008	Kitt Peak	Spacewatch	TIR	2.2 km	MPC · JPL
588446	2008 CF_{156}	—	February 9, 2008	Kitt Peak	Spacewatch	·	910 m	MPC · JPL
588447	2008 CY_{160}	—	October 2, 2006	Mount Lemmon	Mount Lemmon Survey	·	1.1 km	MPC · JPL
588448	2008 CJ_{161}	—	February 10, 2008	La Cañada	Lacruz, J.	·	2.3 km	MPC · JPL
588449	2008 CR_{162}	—	February 2, 2008	Kitt Peak	Spacewatch	·	1.0 km	MPC · JPL
588450	2008 CJ_{177}	—	February 14, 2008	Taunus	E. Schwab, R. Kling	·	1.7 km	MPC · JPL
588451	2008 CC_{206}	—	February 7, 2008	Kitt Peak	Spacewatch	THM	1.6 km	MPC · JPL
588452	2008 CF_{217}	—	October 3, 2006	Mount Lemmon	Mount Lemmon Survey	·	1.3 km	MPC · JPL
588453	2008 CE_{219}	—	February 2, 2008	Mount Lemmon	Mount Lemmon Survey	NYS	960 m	MPC · JPL
588454	2008 CZ_{219}	—	January 18, 2013	Kitt Peak	Spacewatch	EOS	1.5 km	MPC · JPL
588455	2008 CX_{220}	—	February 12, 2008	Kitt Peak	Spacewatch	TEL	1 km	MPC · JPL
588456	2008 CF_{222}	—	February 12, 2008	Mount Lemmon	Mount Lemmon Survey	·	1.1 km	MPC · JPL
588457	2008 CP_{222}	—	December 23, 2012	Haleakala	Pan-STARRS 1	·	1.6 km	MPC · JPL
588458	2008 CF_{223}	—	August 12, 2013	Haleakala	Pan-STARRS 1	·	520 m	MPC · JPL
588459	2008 CQ_{223}	—	January 10, 2008	Mount Lemmon	Mount Lemmon Survey	·	980 m	MPC · JPL
588460	2008 CU_{223}	—	March 19, 2009	Kitt Peak	Spacewatch	HYG	2.2 km	MPC · JPL
588461	2008 CW_{224}	—	October 12, 2016	Mount Lemmon	Mount Lemmon Survey	EOS	1.5 km	MPC · JPL
588462	2008 CF_{235}	—	October 3, 2010	Catalina	CSS	·	1.0 km	MPC · JPL
588463	2008 CE_{237}	—	February 7, 2008	Kitt Peak	Spacewatch	·	1.0 km	MPC · JPL
588464	2008 CH_{237}	—	October 30, 2010	Mount Lemmon	Mount Lemmon Survey	·	880 m	MPC · JPL
588465	2008 CQ_{237}	—	July 2, 2013	Haleakala	Pan-STARRS 1	·	1.0 km	MPC · JPL
588466	2008 CS_{238}	—	February 8, 2008	Kitt Peak	Spacewatch	LIX	2.5 km	MPC · JPL
588467	2008 CW_{238}	—	February 9, 2008	Kitt Peak	Spacewatch	HYG	2.5 km	MPC · JPL
588468	2008 CC_{239}	—	February 2, 2008	Mount Lemmon	Mount Lemmon Survey	·	1.8 km	MPC · JPL
588469	2008 CQ_{240}	—	February 13, 2008	Mount Lemmon	Mount Lemmon Survey	·	1.9 km	MPC · JPL
588470	2008 DE_{25}	—	February 7, 2008	Kitt Peak	Spacewatch	·	2.1 km	MPC · JPL
588471	2008 DX_{41}	—	February 28, 2008	Kitt Peak	Spacewatch	·	2.0 km	MPC · JPL
588472	2008 DH_{51}	—	February 29, 2008	Mount Lemmon	Mount Lemmon Survey	·	2.7 km	MPC · JPL
588473	2008 DD_{52}	—	February 29, 2008	Mount Lemmon	Mount Lemmon Survey	·	2.4 km	MPC · JPL
588474	2008 DB_{65}	—	February 28, 2008	Mount Lemmon	Mount Lemmon Survey	·	2.3 km	MPC · JPL
588475	2008 DA_{71}	—	February 29, 2008	Catalina	CSS	·	2.7 km	MPC · JPL
588476	2008 DX_{72}	—	February 26, 2008	Mount Lemmon	Mount Lemmon Survey	·	2.0 km	MPC · JPL
588477	2008 DR_{75}	—	February 28, 2008	Mount Lemmon	Mount Lemmon Survey	·	2.5 km	MPC · JPL
588478	2008 DD_{77}	—	February 28, 2008	Mount Lemmon	Mount Lemmon Survey	·	1.8 km	MPC · JPL
588479	2008 DM_{78}	—	February 28, 2008	Mount Lemmon	Mount Lemmon Survey	·	2.2 km	MPC · JPL
588480	2008 DX_{84}	—	February 28, 2008	Mount Lemmon	Mount Lemmon Survey	·	1.3 km	MPC · JPL
588481	2008 DE_{93}	—	February 26, 2008	Mount Lemmon	Mount Lemmon Survey	·	1.5 km	MPC · JPL
588482	2008 DO_{95}	—	February 29, 2008	Mount Lemmon	Mount Lemmon Survey	·	1.1 km	MPC · JPL
588483	2008 DB_{96}	—	February 28, 2008	Kitt Peak	Spacewatch	·	2.4 km	MPC · JPL
588484	2008 DC_{96}	—	February 29, 2008	Kitt Peak	Spacewatch	·	820 m	MPC · JPL
588485	2008 EN_{2}	—	March 1, 2008	Mount Lemmon	Mount Lemmon Survey	EOS	1.5 km	MPC · JPL
588486	2008 EM_{3}	—	March 1, 2008	Mount Lemmon	Mount Lemmon Survey	EOS	1.6 km	MPC · JPL
588487	2008 EY_{13}	—	March 1, 2008	Kitt Peak	Spacewatch	EOS	1.9 km	MPC · JPL
588488	2008 EB_{17}	—	October 13, 2005	Kitt Peak	Spacewatch	·	2.2 km	MPC · JPL
588489	2008 ET_{31}	—	September 14, 2005	Kitt Peak	Spacewatch	·	1.9 km	MPC · JPL
588490	2008 EX_{53}	—	March 6, 2008	Mount Lemmon	Mount Lemmon Survey	·	2.4 km	MPC · JPL
588491	2008 ET_{60}	—	April 10, 2003	Kitt Peak	Spacewatch	·	2.7 km	MPC · JPL
588492	2008 EJ_{62}	—	August 6, 2005	Palomar	NEAT	EOS	2.1 km	MPC · JPL
588493	2008 EP_{71}	—	August 30, 2005	Kitt Peak	Spacewatch	·	2.6 km	MPC · JPL
588494	2008 EQ_{71}	—	November 16, 2006	Catalina	CSS	AGN	960 m	MPC · JPL
588495	2008 EP_{80}	—	January 15, 2008	Mount Lemmon	Mount Lemmon Survey	·	900 m	MPC · JPL
588496	2008 EN_{85}	—	April 1, 2003	Bergisch Gladbach	W. Bickel	EOS	2.2 km	MPC · JPL
588497	2008 EE_{93}	—	March 1, 2008	Kitt Peak	Spacewatch	·	1.9 km	MPC · JPL
588498	2008 EF_{93}	—	March 1, 2008	Kitt Peak	Spacewatch	·	2.6 km	MPC · JPL
588499	2008 EN_{126}	—	March 10, 2008	Kitt Peak	Spacewatch	·	1.3 km	MPC · JPL
588500	2008 EA_{127}	—	March 10, 2008	Kitt Peak	Spacewatch	·	2.0 km	MPC · JPL

== 588501–588600 ==
back to top

Designation			Discovery			Properties		Ref
Permanent	Provisional	Named after	Date	Site	Discoverer(s)	Category	Diam.	Ref
588501	2008 EH_{138}	—	March 1, 2008	Kitt Peak	Spacewatch	·	1.9 km	MPC · JPL
588502	2008 ET_{138}	—	March 11, 2008	Mount Lemmon	Mount Lemmon Survey	EOS	1.7 km	MPC · JPL
588503	2008 ED_{144}	—	March 27, 2008	Mount Lemmon	Mount Lemmon Survey	·	2.7 km	MPC · JPL
588504	2008 EM_{172}	—	November 25, 2011	Haleakala	Pan-STARRS 1	·	3.1 km	MPC · JPL
588505	2008 EP_{172}	—	June 22, 2014	Kitt Peak	Spacewatch	·	2.8 km	MPC · JPL
588506	2008 EU_{172}	—	October 24, 2011	Haleakala	Pan-STARRS 1	·	1.9 km	MPC · JPL
588507	2008 EJ_{179}	—	February 28, 2014	Haleakala	Pan-STARRS 1	THM	1.8 km	MPC · JPL
588508	2008 EH_{181}	—	January 17, 2013	Haleakala	Pan-STARRS 1	·	3.0 km	MPC · JPL
588509	2008 EU_{182}	—	September 30, 2006	Mount Lemmon	Mount Lemmon Survey	·	1.3 km	MPC · JPL
588510	2008 EW_{182}	—	January 18, 2013	Mount Lemmon	Mount Lemmon Survey	·	2.7 km	MPC · JPL
588511	2008 EQ_{183}	—	July 12, 2015	Haleakala	Pan-STARRS 1	·	2.2 km	MPC · JPL
588512	2008 EA_{184}	—	June 6, 2014	Haleakala	Pan-STARRS 1	·	2.4 km	MPC · JPL
588513	2008 EJ_{186}	—	November 13, 2012	Mount Lemmon	Mount Lemmon Survey	·	3.7 km	MPC · JPL
588514	2008 EC_{187}	—	March 11, 2008	Mount Lemmon	Mount Lemmon Survey	·	2.2 km	MPC · JPL
588515	2008 ED_{188}	—	March 5, 2008	Mount Lemmon	Mount Lemmon Survey	·	2.9 km	MPC · JPL
588516	2008 EH_{188}	—	March 10, 2008	Mount Lemmon	Mount Lemmon Survey	·	2.8 km	MPC · JPL
588517	2008 EQ_{189}	—	March 5, 2008	Mount Lemmon	Mount Lemmon Survey	HYG	1.8 km	MPC · JPL
588518	2008 EW_{189}	—	February 10, 2008	Mount Lemmon	Mount Lemmon Survey	·	2.7 km	MPC · JPL
588519	2008 ED_{190}	—	March 1, 2008	Kitt Peak	Spacewatch	EOS	1.5 km	MPC · JPL
588520	2008 EO_{190}	—	March 5, 2008	Kitt Peak	Spacewatch	LIX	2.9 km	MPC · JPL
588521	2008 EP_{191}	—	March 7, 2008	Mount Lemmon	Mount Lemmon Survey	·	2.2 km	MPC · JPL
588522	2008 EU_{191}	—	March 9, 2008	Mount Lemmon	Mount Lemmon Survey	·	1.8 km	MPC · JPL
588523	2008 EY_{191}	—	March 8, 2008	Mount Lemmon	Mount Lemmon Survey	HYG	2.1 km	MPC · JPL
588524	2008 EA_{193}	—	March 10, 2008	Kitt Peak	Spacewatch	·	1.7 km	MPC · JPL
588525	2008 FK_{1}	—	January 11, 2008	Mount Lemmon	Mount Lemmon Survey	NYS	850 m	MPC · JPL
588526	2008 FD_{11}	—	February 8, 2008	Kitt Peak	Spacewatch	V	550 m	MPC · JPL
588527	2008 FL_{17}	—	February 10, 2008	Kitt Peak	Spacewatch	MAS	710 m	MPC · JPL
588528	2008 FK_{19}	—	August 11, 2004	Socorro	LINEAR	·	2.8 km	MPC · JPL
588529	2008 FN_{21}	—	March 27, 2008	Kitt Peak	Spacewatch	·	2.3 km	MPC · JPL
588530	2008 FS_{34}	—	February 13, 2008	Mount Lemmon	Mount Lemmon Survey	EOS	1.7 km	MPC · JPL
588531	2008 FA_{45}	—	March 8, 2008	Mount Lemmon	Mount Lemmon Survey	·	2.1 km	MPC · JPL
588532	2008 FL_{72}	—	March 30, 2008	Kitt Peak	Spacewatch	·	2.5 km	MPC · JPL
588533	2008 FN_{78}	—	March 27, 2008	Mount Lemmon	Mount Lemmon Survey	KOR	1.0 km	MPC · JPL
588534	2008 FY_{79}	—	March 10, 2008	Kitt Peak	Spacewatch	·	1.9 km	MPC · JPL
588535	2008 FN_{95}	—	March 29, 2008	Mount Lemmon	Mount Lemmon Survey	EOS	1.5 km	MPC · JPL
588536	2008 FD_{103}	—	March 30, 2008	Kitt Peak	Spacewatch	·	700 m	MPC · JPL
588537	2008 FM_{107}	—	March 31, 2008	Kitt Peak	Spacewatch	·	2.2 km	MPC · JPL
588538	2008 FV_{111}	—	March 31, 2008	Kitt Peak	Spacewatch	THB	2.5 km	MPC · JPL
588539	2008 FT_{115}	—	March 31, 2008	Mount Lemmon	Mount Lemmon Survey	KOR	1.2 km	MPC · JPL
588540	2008 FT_{119}	—	March 11, 2008	Kitt Peak	Spacewatch	EOS	1.8 km	MPC · JPL
588541	2008 FA_{126}	—	March 30, 2008	Piszkéstető	K. Sárneczky	·	2.3 km	MPC · JPL
588542	2008 FB_{132}	—	March 31, 2008	Kitt Peak	Spacewatch	·	1.1 km	MPC · JPL
588543	2008 FL_{132}	—	March 27, 2008	Mount Lemmon	Mount Lemmon Survey	·	1.3 km	MPC · JPL
588544	2008 FT_{138}	—	February 9, 2002	Kitt Peak	Spacewatch	EOS	1.9 km	MPC · JPL
588545	2008 FM_{140}	—	March 31, 2008	Kitt Peak	Spacewatch	T_{j} (2.95) · 3:2	4.2 km	MPC · JPL
588546	2008 FG_{142}	—	March 31, 2008	Mount Lemmon	Mount Lemmon Survey	·	2.4 km	MPC · JPL
588547	2008 FS_{144}	—	April 5, 2014	Haleakala	Pan-STARRS 1	·	2.0 km	MPC · JPL
588548	2008 FR_{146}	—	March 27, 2008	Mount Lemmon	Mount Lemmon Survey	·	2.0 km	MPC · JPL
588549	2008 FL_{148}	—	March 28, 2008	Mount Lemmon	Mount Lemmon Survey	·	1.2 km	MPC · JPL
588550	2008 GJ_{25}	—	March 8, 2008	Kitt Peak	Spacewatch	·	2.4 km	MPC · JPL
588551	2008 GM_{28}	—	April 3, 2008	Kitt Peak	Spacewatch	H	390 m	MPC · JPL
588552	2008 GS_{28}	—	April 3, 2008	Kitt Peak	Spacewatch	·	1.5 km	MPC · JPL
588553	2008 GR_{36}	—	April 3, 2008	Kitt Peak	Spacewatch	T_{j} (2.98)	2.4 km	MPC · JPL
588554	2008 GV_{52}	—	April 5, 2008	Mount Lemmon	Mount Lemmon Survey	·	2.1 km	MPC · JPL
588555	2008 GR_{54}	—	April 5, 2008	Mount Lemmon	Mount Lemmon Survey	EOS	1.5 km	MPC · JPL
588556	2008 GB_{62}	—	April 5, 2008	Mount Lemmon	Mount Lemmon Survey	·	2.5 km	MPC · JPL
588557	2008 GS_{63}	—	November 24, 2002	Palomar	NEAT	MAS	680 m	MPC · JPL
588558	2008 GQ_{75}	—	April 7, 2008	Kitt Peak	Spacewatch	·	840 m	MPC · JPL
588559	2008 GC_{86}	—	March 28, 2008	Mount Lemmon	Mount Lemmon Survey	·	2.7 km	MPC · JPL
588560	2008 GU_{90}	—	September 13, 2005	Kitt Peak	Spacewatch	·	2.0 km	MPC · JPL
588561	2008 GF_{121}	—	March 5, 2008	Mount Lemmon	Mount Lemmon Survey	·	2.8 km	MPC · JPL
588562	2008 GE_{135}	—	April 1, 2008	Mount Lemmon	Mount Lemmon Survey	·	2.2 km	MPC · JPL
588563	2008 GD_{139}	—	April 1, 2008	Mount Lemmon	Mount Lemmon Survey	·	2.0 km	MPC · JPL
588564	2008 GW_{149}	—	December 16, 2011	Mount Lemmon	Mount Lemmon Survey	EOS	1.8 km	MPC · JPL
588565	2008 GZ_{149}	—	May 6, 2014	Haleakala	Pan-STARRS 1	VER	2.3 km	MPC · JPL
588566	2008 GC_{151}	—	February 19, 2013	Kitt Peak	Spacewatch	·	2.1 km	MPC · JPL
588567	2008 GN_{151}	—	April 8, 2008	Kitt Peak	Spacewatch	·	2.3 km	MPC · JPL
588568	2008 GA_{153}	—	April 7, 2008	Kitt Peak	Spacewatch	EOS	1.4 km	MPC · JPL
588569	2008 GB_{155}	—	October 19, 2016	Mount Lemmon	Mount Lemmon Survey	EOS	1.3 km	MPC · JPL
588570	2008 GC_{155}	—	March 5, 2013	Mount Lemmon	Mount Lemmon Survey	·	3.2 km	MPC · JPL
588571	2008 GF_{155}	—	October 12, 2010	Mount Lemmon	Mount Lemmon Survey	·	1.9 km	MPC · JPL
588572	2008 GJ_{157}	—	March 12, 2008	Kitt Peak	Spacewatch	·	3.3 km	MPC · JPL
588573	2008 GW_{157}	—	April 7, 2008	Kitt Peak	Spacewatch	·	2.2 km	MPC · JPL
588574	2008 GY_{157}	—	March 7, 2008	Kitt Peak	Spacewatch	·	2.8 km	MPC · JPL
588575	2008 GJ_{158}	—	December 30, 2011	Kitt Peak	Spacewatch	·	1.9 km	MPC · JPL
588576	2008 GQ_{158}	—	April 14, 2008	Mount Lemmon	Mount Lemmon Survey	·	2.1 km	MPC · JPL
588577	2008 GC_{159}	—	April 5, 2008	Mount Lemmon	Mount Lemmon Survey	·	2.9 km	MPC · JPL
588578	2008 GQ_{160}	—	April 15, 2008	Mount Lemmon	Mount Lemmon Survey	·	2.3 km	MPC · JPL
588579	2008 GR_{162}	—	April 4, 2008	Mount Lemmon	Mount Lemmon Survey	·	3.0 km	MPC · JPL
588580	2008 GQ_{166}	—	August 21, 2015	Haleakala	Pan-STARRS 1	EOS	1.5 km	MPC · JPL
588581	2008 GX_{167}	—	December 21, 2006	Kitt Peak	L. H. Wasserman, M. W. Buie	·	2.1 km	MPC · JPL
588582	2008 GS_{168}	—	April 11, 2008	Mount Lemmon	Mount Lemmon Survey	·	790 m	MPC · JPL
588583	2008 GK_{169}	—	April 3, 2008	Mount Lemmon	Mount Lemmon Survey	·	1.9 km	MPC · JPL
588584	2008 GA_{170}	—	April 11, 2008	Mount Lemmon	Mount Lemmon Survey	·	780 m	MPC · JPL
588585	2008 HH_{11}	—	April 24, 2008	Kitt Peak	Spacewatch	·	3.4 km	MPC · JPL
588586	2008 HK_{24}	—	April 3, 2008	Mount Lemmon	Mount Lemmon Survey	·	2.1 km	MPC · JPL
588587	2008 HJ_{42}	—	March 28, 2008	Mount Lemmon	Mount Lemmon Survey	·	1.9 km	MPC · JPL
588588	2008 HC_{48}	—	October 11, 2006	Kitt Peak	Spacewatch	MAS	900 m	MPC · JPL
588589	2008 HP_{57}	—	April 30, 2008	Kitt Peak	Spacewatch	·	2.4 km	MPC · JPL
588590	2008 HL_{72}	—	April 30, 2008	Mount Lemmon	Mount Lemmon Survey	·	1.2 km	MPC · JPL
588591	2008 HQ_{73}	—	April 29, 2012	Mount Lemmon	Mount Lemmon Survey	·	750 m	MPC · JPL
588592	2008 HE_{74}	—	April 25, 2008	Kitt Peak	Spacewatch	·	3.0 km	MPC · JPL
588593	2008 HM_{75}	—	November 25, 2011	Haleakala	Pan-STARRS 1	·	2.3 km	MPC · JPL
588594	2008 HR_{75}	—	December 15, 2014	Mount Lemmon	Mount Lemmon Survey	·	760 m	MPC · JPL
588595	2008 HB_{77}	—	April 29, 2008	Kitt Peak	Spacewatch	·	2.7 km	MPC · JPL
588596	2008 HF_{77}	—	April 29, 2008	Kitt Peak	Spacewatch	EOS	1.6 km	MPC · JPL
588597	2008 JW_{8}	—	May 1, 2008	Catalina	CSS	·	920 m	MPC · JPL
588598	2008 JA_{9}	—	May 1, 2008	Siding Spring	SSS	TIR	3.6 km	MPC · JPL
588599	2008 JA_{17}	—	May 3, 2008	Mount Lemmon	Mount Lemmon Survey	·	2.6 km	MPC · JPL
588600	2008 JG_{17}	—	April 8, 2008	Kitt Peak	Spacewatch	·	1.1 km	MPC · JPL

== 588601–588700 ==
back to top

Designation			Discovery			Properties		Ref
Permanent	Provisional	Named after	Date	Site	Discoverer(s)	Category	Diam.	Ref
588601	2008 JL_{18}	—	May 4, 2008	Kitt Peak	Spacewatch	·	900 m	MPC · JPL
588602	2008 JL_{30}	—	May 3, 2008	Kitt Peak	Spacewatch	·	3.6 km	MPC · JPL
588603	2008 JT_{42}	—	May 12, 2008	Siding Spring	SSS	EOS	2.1 km	MPC · JPL
588604	2008 JV_{43}	—	May 14, 2008	Mount Lemmon	Mount Lemmon Survey	·	970 m	MPC · JPL
588605	2008 JA_{44}	—	October 7, 2016	Mount Lemmon	Mount Lemmon Survey	·	2.2 km	MPC · JPL
588606	2008 JG_{50}	—	May 14, 2008	Kitt Peak	Spacewatch	·	700 m	MPC · JPL
588607	2008 KU_{10}	—	March 29, 2008	Kitt Peak	Spacewatch	·	760 m	MPC · JPL
588608	2008 KZ_{13}	—	October 11, 2001	Kitt Peak	Spacewatch	MAR	1.0 km	MPC · JPL
588609	2008 KU_{23}	—	May 28, 2008	Kitt Peak	Spacewatch	·	850 m	MPC · JPL
588610	2008 KL_{24}	—	May 28, 2008	Kitt Peak	Spacewatch	JUN	930 m	MPC · JPL
588611	2008 KH_{30}	—	May 29, 2008	Kitt Peak	Spacewatch	·	920 m	MPC · JPL
588612	2008 KY_{32}	—	May 29, 2008	Mount Lemmon	Mount Lemmon Survey	·	2.6 km	MPC · JPL
588613	2008 KO_{36}	—	May 29, 2008	Mount Lemmon	Mount Lemmon Survey	·	830 m	MPC · JPL
588614	2008 KT_{36}	—	May 29, 2008	Kitt Peak	Spacewatch	VER	3.2 km	MPC · JPL
588615	2008 KE_{38}	—	May 3, 2008	Mount Lemmon	Mount Lemmon Survey	·	2.4 km	MPC · JPL
588616	2008 KW_{39}	—	May 31, 2008	Kitt Peak	Spacewatch	·	3.6 km	MPC · JPL
588617	2008 KZ_{39}	—	May 31, 2008	Kitt Peak	Spacewatch	EOS	2.1 km	MPC · JPL
588618	2008 KY_{43}	—	October 14, 2013	Mount Lemmon	Mount Lemmon Survey	·	1.1 km	MPC · JPL
588619	2008 KC_{44}	—	September 28, 2009	Catalina	CSS	·	3.1 km	MPC · JPL
588620	2008 KP_{44}	—	February 24, 2012	Mount Lemmon	Mount Lemmon Survey	·	1.5 km	MPC · JPL
588621	2008 KZ_{44}	—	November 8, 2010	Mount Lemmon	Mount Lemmon Survey	·	2.7 km	MPC · JPL
588622	2008 KD_{45}	—	January 17, 2018	Haleakala	Pan-STARRS 1	·	2.5 km	MPC · JPL
588623	2008 KY_{46}	—	January 26, 2012	Haleakala	Pan-STARRS 1	·	2.5 km	MPC · JPL
588624	2008 KZ_{46}	—	December 3, 2010	Mount Lemmon	Mount Lemmon Survey	·	3.0 km	MPC · JPL
588625	2008 KX_{47}	—	May 12, 2012	Mount Lemmon	Mount Lemmon Survey	·	820 m	MPC · JPL
588626	2008 KB_{48}	—	September 8, 2015	Haleakala	Pan-STARRS 1	EOS	1.7 km	MPC · JPL
588627	2008 KQ_{48}	—	May 27, 2008	Kitt Peak	Spacewatch	·	2.4 km	MPC · JPL
588628	2008 LF_{1}	—	April 28, 2008	Mount Lemmon	Mount Lemmon Survey	VER	2.4 km	MPC · JPL
588629	2008 LK_{2}	—	June 3, 2008	Kitt Peak	Spacewatch	H	340 m	MPC · JPL
588630	2008 LO_{7}	—	June 3, 2008	Kitt Peak	Spacewatch	·	2.5 km	MPC · JPL
588631	2008 LM_{16}	—	April 5, 2008	Kitt Peak	Spacewatch	L5	8.9 km	MPC · JPL
588632	2008 LL_{19}	—	October 13, 2013	Kitt Peak	Spacewatch	MAR	630 m	MPC · JPL
588633	2008 LR_{19}	—	January 19, 2012	Kitt Peak	Spacewatch	·	3.5 km	MPC · JPL
588634	2008 NU_{2}	—	June 6, 2008	Kitt Peak	Spacewatch	·	1.5 km	MPC · JPL
588635	2008 NK_{3}	—	August 27, 2003	Palomar	NEAT	·	4.1 km	MPC · JPL
588636	2008 ON_{15}	—	July 30, 2008	Mount Lemmon	Mount Lemmon Survey	·	1.2 km	MPC · JPL
588637	2008 OW_{16}	—	July 28, 2008	Mount Lemmon	Mount Lemmon Survey	·	1.1 km	MPC · JPL
588638	2008 OW_{22}	—	February 6, 2002	Kitt Peak	Deep Ecliptic Survey	L4 · 006	8.4 km	MPC · JPL
588639	2008 OH_{26}	—	October 14, 2013	Kitt Peak	Spacewatch	·	1.2 km	MPC · JPL
588640	2008 OU_{26}	—	January 28, 2015	Haleakala	Pan-STARRS 1	MAR	960 m	MPC · JPL
588641	2008 OA_{27}	—	February 9, 2014	Kitt Peak	Spacewatch	L4	7.3 km	MPC · JPL
588642	2008 OJ_{28}	—	January 31, 2015	Haleakala	Pan-STARRS 1	EUN	1.1 km	MPC · JPL
588643	2008 OO_{31}	—	July 29, 2008	Mount Lemmon	Mount Lemmon Survey	EUN	840 m	MPC · JPL
588644	2008 OQ_{31}	—	July 29, 2008	Kitt Peak	Spacewatch	L4 · ERY	7.4 km	MPC · JPL
588645	2008 PA_{3}	—	August 3, 2008	Dauban	Kugel, C. R. F.	·	1.1 km	MPC · JPL
588646	2008 PY_{13}	—	August 10, 2008	La Sagra	OAM	·	1.1 km	MPC · JPL
588647	2008 PE_{20}	—	August 7, 2008	Kitt Peak	Spacewatch	L4	5.9 km	MPC · JPL
588648	2008 PZ_{22}	—	February 16, 2015	Haleakala	Pan-STARRS 1	HNS	1.0 km	MPC · JPL
588649	2008 PW_{23}	—	August 7, 2008	Kitt Peak	Spacewatch	·	2.7 km	MPC · JPL
588650	2008 PH_{24}	—	August 11, 2008	Charleston	R. Holmes	·	2.8 km	MPC · JPL
588651	2008 PL_{24}	—	August 7, 2008	Kitt Peak	Spacewatch	·	1.4 km	MPC · JPL
588652	2008 QS	—	August 23, 2008	Wildberg	R. Apitzsch	·	1.4 km	MPC · JPL
588653	2008 QD_{11}	—	August 26, 2008	La Sagra	OAM	(1547)	1.7 km	MPC · JPL
588654	2008 QC_{23}	—	August 26, 2008	Socorro	LINEAR	·	1.3 km	MPC · JPL
588655	2008 QK_{28}	—	November 10, 2004	Kitt Peak	Spacewatch	·	1.6 km	MPC · JPL
588656	2008 QF_{29}	—	August 26, 2008	Piszkéstető	K. Sárneczky	L4	7.8 km	MPC · JPL
588657	2008 QW_{32}	—	August 31, 2008	Bergisch Gladbach	W. Bickel	H	480 m	MPC · JPL
588658	2008 QC_{43}	—	August 27, 2008	Črni Vrh	Mikuž, B.	H	660 m	MPC · JPL
588659	2008 QF_{49}	—	June 14, 2012	Haleakala	Pan-STARRS 1	·	1.6 km	MPC · JPL
588660	2008 RH_{6}	—	September 3, 2008	Kitt Peak	Spacewatch	·	1.2 km	MPC · JPL
588661	2008 RO_{6}	—	August 20, 2008	Kitt Peak	Spacewatch	·	3.2 km	MPC · JPL
588662	2008 RG_{13}	—	August 24, 2008	Kitt Peak	Spacewatch	·	1.6 km	MPC · JPL
588663	2008 RQ_{14}	—	September 4, 2008	Kitt Peak	Spacewatch	L4	7.4 km	MPC · JPL
588664	2008 RJ_{15}	—	August 24, 2008	Kitt Peak	Spacewatch	·	1.9 km	MPC · JPL
588665	2008 RY_{19}	—	September 4, 2008	Kitt Peak	Spacewatch	·	1.3 km	MPC · JPL
588666	2008 RX_{50}	—	July 29, 2008	Mount Lemmon	Mount Lemmon Survey	·	1.2 km	MPC · JPL
588667	2008 RT_{53}	—	October 1, 2003	Kitt Peak	Spacewatch	·	2.7 km	MPC · JPL
588668	2008 RU_{62}	—	September 4, 2008	Kitt Peak	Spacewatch	L4	5.9 km	MPC · JPL
588669	2008 RJ_{75}	—	September 6, 2008	Catalina	CSS	·	1.5 km	MPC · JPL
588670	2008 RY_{84}	—	September 4, 2008	Kitt Peak	Spacewatch	·	1.0 km	MPC · JPL
588671	2008 RX_{90}	—	February 25, 2007	Mount Lemmon	Mount Lemmon Survey	·	500 m	MPC · JPL
588672	2008 RF_{94}	—	September 6, 2008	Kitt Peak	Spacewatch	·	1.3 km	MPC · JPL
588673	2008 RA_{95}	—	September 7, 2008	Mount Lemmon	Mount Lemmon Survey	·	1.5 km	MPC · JPL
588674	2008 RB_{111}	—	September 3, 2008	Kitt Peak	Spacewatch	·	1.4 km	MPC · JPL
588675	2008 RR_{114}	—	September 6, 2008	Mount Lemmon	Mount Lemmon Survey	ADE	1.7 km	MPC · JPL
588676	2008 RE_{122}	—	September 3, 2008	Kitt Peak	Spacewatch	L4	8.2 km	MPC · JPL
588677	2008 RU_{123}	—	July 29, 2008	Kitt Peak	Spacewatch	L4 · HEK	9.4 km	MPC · JPL
588678	2008 RP_{125}	—	September 7, 2008	Mount Lemmon	Mount Lemmon Survey	L4	9.7 km	MPC · JPL
588679	2008 RD_{126}	—	September 9, 2008	Kitt Peak	Spacewatch	L4	7.2 km	MPC · JPL
588680	2008 RU_{135}	—	September 3, 2008	Kitt Peak	Spacewatch	JUN	790 m	MPC · JPL
588681	2008 RJ_{148}	—	September 4, 2008	Kitt Peak	Spacewatch	·	1.3 km	MPC · JPL
588682	2008 RD_{149}	—	September 4, 2008	Kitt Peak	Spacewatch	·	450 m	MPC · JPL
588683	2008 RH_{149}	—	September 9, 2008	Mount Lemmon	Mount Lemmon Survey	MAR	900 m	MPC · JPL
588684	2008 RN_{149}	—	February 7, 2011	Mount Lemmon	Mount Lemmon Survey	·	640 m	MPC · JPL
588685	2008 RA_{150}	—	September 5, 2008	Kitt Peak	Spacewatch	·	1.3 km	MPC · JPL
588686	2008 RH_{150}	—	September 6, 2008	Mount Lemmon	Mount Lemmon Survey	·	1.4 km	MPC · JPL
588687	2008 RC_{151}	—	September 9, 2008	Kitt Peak	Spacewatch	·	1.5 km	MPC · JPL
588688	2008 RQ_{151}	—	September 3, 2008	Kitt Peak	Spacewatch	·	1.4 km	MPC · JPL
588689	2008 RS_{151}	—	September 7, 2008	Mount Lemmon	Mount Lemmon Survey	·	1.2 km	MPC · JPL
588690	2008 RD_{154}	—	September 3, 2008	Kitt Peak	Spacewatch	·	1.2 km	MPC · JPL
588691	2008 RO_{161}	—	September 3, 2008	Kitt Peak	Spacewatch	L4	7.7 km	MPC · JPL
588692	2008 RV_{161}	—	September 3, 2008	Kitt Peak	Spacewatch	MAS	590 m	MPC · JPL
588693	2008 RN_{162}	—	October 22, 2009	Mount Lemmon	Mount Lemmon Survey	L4	6.1 km	MPC · JPL
588694	2008 RQ_{162}	—	July 29, 2008	Mount Lemmon	Mount Lemmon Survey	L4	7.3 km	MPC · JPL
588695	2008 RT_{162}	—	September 5, 2008	Kitt Peak	Spacewatch	·	1.2 km	MPC · JPL
588696	2008 RN_{167}	—	September 5, 2008	Kitt Peak	Spacewatch	·	2.4 km	MPC · JPL
588697	2008 RO_{167}	—	September 10, 2008	Kitt Peak	Spacewatch	L4	6.6 km	MPC · JPL
588698	2008 RV_{169}	—	September 5, 2008	Kitt Peak	Spacewatch	L4	7.3 km	MPC · JPL
588699	2008 RO_{171}	—	September 6, 2008	Siding Spring	SSS	·	1.7 km	MPC · JPL
588700	2008 RG_{172}	—	September 7, 2008	Mount Lemmon	Mount Lemmon Survey	L4	7.2 km	MPC · JPL

== 588701–588800 ==
back to top

Designation			Discovery			Properties		Ref
Permanent	Provisional	Named after	Date	Site	Discoverer(s)	Category	Diam.	Ref
588701	2008 RU_{173}	—	September 6, 2008	Mount Lemmon	Mount Lemmon Survey	·	1.1 km	MPC · JPL
588702	2008 RJ_{174}	—	September 3, 2008	Kitt Peak	Spacewatch	L4	8.5 km	MPC · JPL
588703	2008 RR_{176}	—	September 4, 2008	Kitt Peak	Spacewatch	·	3.0 km	MPC · JPL
588704	2008 RG_{178}	—	September 6, 2008	Kitt Peak	Spacewatch	WIT	810 m	MPC · JPL
588705	2008 SF_{6}	—	November 11, 2004	Kitt Peak	Spacewatch	·	1.5 km	MPC · JPL
588706	2008 SM_{10}	—	September 21, 2008	Mount Lemmon	Mount Lemmon Survey	·	1.4 km	MPC · JPL
588707	2008 SM_{17}	—	September 29, 2005	Mount Lemmon	Mount Lemmon Survey	·	520 m	MPC · JPL
588708	2008 SP_{22}	—	March 20, 2002	Kitt Peak	Deep Ecliptic Survey	L4	8.1 km	MPC · JPL
588709	2008 SQ_{24}	—	September 6, 2008	Kitt Peak	Spacewatch	·	580 m	MPC · JPL
588710	2008 SL_{31}	—	September 20, 2008	Kitt Peak	Spacewatch	EUN	1.0 km	MPC · JPL
588711	2008 SE_{38}	—	January 5, 2006	Kitt Peak	Spacewatch	·	1.3 km	MPC · JPL
588712	2008 SP_{58}	—	September 20, 2008	Kitt Peak	Spacewatch	·	1.6 km	MPC · JPL
588713	2008 SC_{62}	—	September 9, 2008	Mount Lemmon	Mount Lemmon Survey	(5)	930 m	MPC · JPL
588714	2008 SA_{66}	—	September 21, 2008	Mount Lemmon	Mount Lemmon Survey	·	510 m	MPC · JPL
588715	2008 SY_{88}	—	September 20, 2008	Catalina	CSS	·	1.8 km	MPC · JPL
588716	2008 SV_{91}	—	September 21, 2008	Kitt Peak	Spacewatch	MAS	540 m	MPC · JPL
588717	2008 SE_{93}	—	September 21, 2008	Kitt Peak	Spacewatch	·	530 m	MPC · JPL
588718	2008 SQ_{93}	—	May 4, 2006	Kitt Peak	Spacewatch	·	2.9 km	MPC · JPL
588719	2008 SU_{111}	—	September 7, 2008	Mount Lemmon	Mount Lemmon Survey	·	1.0 km	MPC · JPL
588720	2008 ST_{121}	—	September 22, 2008	Mount Lemmon	Mount Lemmon Survey	·	2.0 km	MPC · JPL
588721	2008 SD_{137}	—	September 23, 2008	Mount Lemmon	Mount Lemmon Survey	L4	6.9 km	MPC · JPL
588722	2008 SS_{140}	—	September 24, 2008	Mount Lemmon	Mount Lemmon Survey	·	1.2 km	MPC · JPL
588723	2008 SF_{144}	—	January 8, 2006	Mount Lemmon	Mount Lemmon Survey	(5)	1.2 km	MPC · JPL
588724	2008 SK_{146}	—	September 23, 2008	Kitt Peak	Spacewatch	L4	8.7 km	MPC · JPL
588725	2008 SM_{169}	—	April 24, 2007	Kitt Peak	Spacewatch	·	1.6 km	MPC · JPL
588726	2008 SE_{180}	—	September 24, 2008	Mount Lemmon	Mount Lemmon Survey	(5)	1.2 km	MPC · JPL
588727	2008 SQ_{190}	—	September 25, 2008	Mount Lemmon	Mount Lemmon Survey	·	1.4 km	MPC · JPL
588728	2008 SM_{207}	—	September 27, 2008	Mount Lemmon	Mount Lemmon Survey	L4	8.2 km	MPC · JPL
588729	2008 SJ_{209}	—	September 28, 2008	Mount Lemmon	Mount Lemmon Survey	·	1.4 km	MPC · JPL
588730	2008 SO_{216}	—	September 9, 2008	Bergisch Gladbach	W. Bickel	·	710 m	MPC · JPL
588731	2008 SZ_{221}	—	September 25, 2008	Mount Lemmon	Mount Lemmon Survey	·	1.1 km	MPC · JPL
588732	2008 SC_{232}	—	September 5, 2008	Kitt Peak	Spacewatch	RAF	740 m	MPC · JPL
588733	2008 SH_{232}	—	September 28, 2008	Mount Lemmon	Mount Lemmon Survey	L4	7.7 km	MPC · JPL
588734	2008 SB_{233}	—	September 28, 2008	Mount Lemmon	Mount Lemmon Survey	·	1.1 km	MPC · JPL
588735	2008 SE_{233}	—	September 28, 2008	Mount Lemmon	Mount Lemmon Survey	L4	6.5 km	MPC · JPL
588736	2008 SV_{252}	—	September 20, 2008	Mount Lemmon	Mount Lemmon Survey	HNS	920 m	MPC · JPL
588737	2008 ST_{264}	—	September 25, 2008	Kitt Peak	Spacewatch	·	620 m	MPC · JPL
588738	2008 SX_{273}	—	September 3, 2008	Kitt Peak	Spacewatch	L4	7.2 km	MPC · JPL
588739	2008 SN_{276}	—	September 23, 2008	Kitt Peak	Spacewatch	·	1.5 km	MPC · JPL
588740	2008 SB_{278}	—	September 28, 2008	Mount Lemmon	Mount Lemmon Survey	L4	7.9 km	MPC · JPL
588741	2008 SD_{290}	—	September 28, 2008	Catalina	CSS	·	1.6 km	MPC · JPL
588742	2008 ST_{290}	—	September 23, 2008	Catalina	CSS	·	1.4 km	MPC · JPL
588743	2008 SM_{292}	—	August 30, 2008	Socorro	LINEAR	·	1.5 km	MPC · JPL
588744	2008 SG_{311}	—	September 29, 2008	Mount Lemmon	Mount Lemmon Survey	·	1.5 km	MPC · JPL
588745	2008 SE_{314}	—	September 20, 2008	Kitt Peak	Spacewatch	·	1.7 km	MPC · JPL
588746	2008 SO_{314}	—	September 23, 2008	Kitt Peak	Spacewatch	·	1.6 km	MPC · JPL
588747	2008 SS_{314}	—	September 29, 2008	Mount Lemmon	Mount Lemmon Survey	·	1.4 km	MPC · JPL
588748	2008 SW_{315}	—	September 24, 2008	Mount Lemmon	Mount Lemmon Survey	WIT	770 m	MPC · JPL
588749	2008 SN_{317}	—	April 1, 2011	Mount Lemmon	Mount Lemmon Survey	·	1.2 km	MPC · JPL
588750	2008 SE_{325}	—	January 2, 2012	Mount Lemmon	Mount Lemmon Survey	L4	7.6 km	MPC · JPL
588751	2008 SH_{328}	—	September 21, 2008	Mount Lemmon	Mount Lemmon Survey	·	1.5 km	MPC · JPL
588752	2008 ST_{329}	—	September 25, 2008	Kitt Peak	Spacewatch	·	1.4 km	MPC · JPL
588753	2008 SW_{331}	—	September 25, 2008	Kitt Peak	Spacewatch	L4	9.2 km	MPC · JPL
588754	2008 SC_{332}	—	January 21, 2015	Haleakala	Pan-STARRS 1	·	1.3 km	MPC · JPL
588755	2008 SR_{332}	—	October 13, 2012	Catalina	CSS	EUN	1.1 km	MPC · JPL
588756	2008 SE_{333}	—	September 23, 2008	Mount Lemmon	Mount Lemmon Survey	·	1.3 km	MPC · JPL
588757	2008 SN_{336}	—	September 25, 2008	Kitt Peak	Spacewatch	·	1.0 km	MPC · JPL
588758	2008 SM_{337}	—	November 27, 2013	Kitt Peak	Spacewatch	·	1.3 km	MPC · JPL
588759	2008 SL_{341}	—	September 28, 2008	Mount Lemmon	Mount Lemmon Survey	·	1.1 km	MPC · JPL
588760	2008 SP_{341}	—	September 28, 2008	Mount Lemmon	Mount Lemmon Survey	·	1.2 km	MPC · JPL
588761	2008 SZ_{343}	—	September 24, 2008	Mount Lemmon	Mount Lemmon Survey	L4	7.6 km	MPC · JPL
588762	2008 SO_{345}	—	September 24, 2008	Kitt Peak	Spacewatch	·	750 m	MPC · JPL
588763	2008 SV_{348}	—	September 23, 2008	Kitt Peak	Spacewatch	L4	6.0 km	MPC · JPL
588764	2008 TW	—	October 1, 2008	Catalina	CSS	H	480 m	MPC · JPL
588765	2008 TV_{11}	—	September 6, 2008	Kitt Peak	Spacewatch	·	2.2 km	MPC · JPL
588766	2008 TT_{12}	—	October 1, 2008	Mount Lemmon	Mount Lemmon Survey	L4	7.5 km	MPC · JPL
588767	2008 TG_{71}	—	October 2, 2008	Kitt Peak	Spacewatch	·	490 m	MPC · JPL
588768	2008 TA_{72}	—	October 2, 2008	Kitt Peak	Spacewatch	·	540 m	MPC · JPL
588769	2008 TV_{72}	—	October 2, 2008	Kitt Peak	Spacewatch	·	1.1 km	MPC · JPL
588770	2008 TD_{86}	—	October 3, 2008	Mount Lemmon	Mount Lemmon Survey	MAS	520 m	MPC · JPL
588771	2008 TQ_{91}	—	September 23, 2008	Goodricke-Pigott	R. A. Tucker	·	1.7 km	MPC · JPL
588772	2008 TV_{108}	—	October 6, 2008	Mount Lemmon	Mount Lemmon Survey	·	1.7 km	MPC · JPL
588773	2008 TQ_{120}	—	September 29, 2008	Catalina	CSS	·	510 m	MPC · JPL
588774	2008 TA_{151}	—	September 2, 2008	Kitt Peak	Spacewatch	·	1.3 km	MPC · JPL
588775	2008 TG_{151}	—	March 2, 2006	Kitt Peak	Spacewatch	·	1.2 km	MPC · JPL
588776	2008 TE_{154}	—	October 9, 2008	Mount Lemmon	Mount Lemmon Survey	·	930 m	MPC · JPL
588777	2008 TR_{154}	—	October 9, 2008	Mount Lemmon	Mount Lemmon Survey	·	2.8 km	MPC · JPL
588778	2008 TF_{174}	—	October 2, 2008	Kitt Peak	Spacewatch	·	1.7 km	MPC · JPL
588779	2008 TV_{186}	—	October 8, 2008	Kitt Peak	Spacewatch	·	1.3 km	MPC · JPL
588780	2008 TY_{193}	—	October 7, 2008	Kitt Peak	Spacewatch	HNS	1.1 km	MPC · JPL
588781	2008 TF_{194}	—	December 28, 2011	Kitt Peak	Spacewatch	L4 · ERY	7.6 km	MPC · JPL
588782	2008 TM_{194}	—	October 6, 2008	Mount Lemmon	Mount Lemmon Survey	WIT	870 m	MPC · JPL
588783	2008 TZ_{194}	—	October 6, 2008	Kitt Peak	Spacewatch	·	1.3 km	MPC · JPL
588784	2008 TB_{195}	—	September 6, 2008	Kitt Peak	Spacewatch	·	2.1 km	MPC · JPL
588785	2008 TJ_{195}	—	October 8, 2008	Kitt Peak	Spacewatch	·	1.4 km	MPC · JPL
588786	2008 TN_{195}	—	December 4, 2013	Haleakala	Pan-STARRS 1	·	1.4 km	MPC · JPL
588787	2008 TS_{196}	—	October 1, 2008	Mount Lemmon	Mount Lemmon Survey	AGN	820 m	MPC · JPL
588788	2008 TZ_{196}	—	October 1, 2008	Mount Lemmon	Mount Lemmon Survey	PHO	1.1 km	MPC · JPL
588789	2008 TL_{198}	—	September 29, 2008	Kitt Peak	Spacewatch	·	1.3 km	MPC · JPL
588790	2008 TM_{198}	—	October 2, 2008	Mount Lemmon	Mount Lemmon Survey	·	1.2 km	MPC · JPL
588791	2008 TX_{201}	—	October 9, 2008	Catalina	CSS	·	1.4 km	MPC · JPL
588792	2008 TE_{204}	—	June 11, 2015	Haleakala	Pan-STARRS 1	·	1.3 km	MPC · JPL
588793	2008 TC_{206}	—	February 15, 2010	Mount Lemmon	Mount Lemmon Survey	·	1.3 km	MPC · JPL
588794	2008 TO_{211}	—	January 1, 2014	Mount Lemmon	Mount Lemmon Survey	·	1.0 km	MPC · JPL
588795	2008 TS_{211}	—	October 10, 2008	Kitt Peak	Spacewatch	·	500 m	MPC · JPL
588796	2008 TZ_{211}	—	November 1, 2010	Kitt Peak	Spacewatch	L4	6.3 km	MPC · JPL
588797	2008 TW_{216}	—	October 8, 2008	Kitt Peak	Spacewatch	THM	1.6 km	MPC · JPL
588798	2008 TK_{218}	—	October 9, 2008	Mount Lemmon	Mount Lemmon Survey	·	1.4 km	MPC · JPL
588799	2008 TQ_{219}	—	October 1, 2008	Mount Lemmon	Mount Lemmon Survey	·	1.7 km	MPC · JPL
588800	2008 TJ_{225}	—	October 10, 2008	Kitt Peak	Spacewatch	·	900 m	MPC · JPL

== 588801–588900 ==
back to top

Designation			Discovery			Properties		Ref
Permanent	Provisional	Named after	Date	Site	Discoverer(s)	Category	Diam.	Ref
588801	2008 TF_{228}	—	October 7, 2008	Mount Lemmon	Mount Lemmon Survey	·	1.5 km	MPC · JPL
588802	2008 US_{1}	—	October 18, 2008	Auberry	Mortfield, P.	L4	7.8 km	MPC · JPL
588803	2008 UK_{9}	—	October 20, 2003	Kitt Peak	Spacewatch	·	1.6 km	MPC · JPL
588804	2008 UW_{15}	—	October 18, 2008	Kitt Peak	Spacewatch	·	3.0 km	MPC · JPL
588805	2008 UJ_{16}	—	October 7, 2004	Kitt Peak	Spacewatch	·	1.3 km	MPC · JPL
588806	2008 UJ_{44}	—	January 30, 2006	Kitt Peak	Spacewatch	·	1.4 km	MPC · JPL
588807	2008 UA_{45}	—	October 20, 2008	Mount Lemmon	Mount Lemmon Survey	·	1.4 km	MPC · JPL
588808	2008 UH_{46}	—	October 20, 2008	Kitt Peak	Spacewatch	H	500 m	MPC · JPL
588809	2008 UU_{49}	—	January 23, 2006	Kitt Peak	Spacewatch	·	1.5 km	MPC · JPL
588810	2008 UF_{50}	—	April 30, 2006	Kitt Peak	Spacewatch	AEO	1.1 km	MPC · JPL
588811	2008 UL_{56}	—	September 24, 2008	Kitt Peak	Spacewatch	·	3.5 km	MPC · JPL
588812	2008 UP_{65}	—	October 21, 2008	Kitt Peak	Spacewatch	PAD	1.6 km	MPC · JPL
588813	2008 UD_{84}	—	October 23, 2008	Kitt Peak	Spacewatch	·	1.3 km	MPC · JPL
588814	2008 UU_{86}	—	October 23, 2008	Mount Lemmon	Mount Lemmon Survey	·	1.4 km	MPC · JPL
588815	2008 UD_{92}	—	October 1, 2008	Catalina	CSS	·	1.4 km	MPC · JPL
588816	2008 UZ_{102}	—	October 6, 2008	Kitt Peak	Spacewatch	(5)	1.3 km	MPC · JPL
588817	2008 UQ_{107}	—	October 21, 2008	Mount Lemmon	Mount Lemmon Survey	·	1.4 km	MPC · JPL
588818	2008 UN_{115}	—	October 22, 2008	Kitt Peak	Spacewatch	·	600 m	MPC · JPL
588819	2008 UV_{120}	—	October 22, 2008	Kitt Peak	Spacewatch	·	520 m	MPC · JPL
588820	2008 UC_{122}	—	October 22, 2008	Kitt Peak	Spacewatch	·	1.5 km	MPC · JPL
588821	2008 UF_{123}	—	July 7, 2003	Kitt Peak	Spacewatch	·	1.2 km	MPC · JPL
588822	2008 UK_{123}	—	October 22, 2008	Kitt Peak	Spacewatch	WIT	890 m	MPC · JPL
588823	2008 UD_{125}	—	October 22, 2008	Kitt Peak	Spacewatch	EUN	1.2 km	MPC · JPL
588824	2008 UO_{130}	—	October 23, 2008	Kitt Peak	Spacewatch	EUN	1 km	MPC · JPL
588825	2008 UY_{158}	—	October 23, 2008	Kitt Peak	Spacewatch	·	2.1 km	MPC · JPL
588826	2008 UP_{171}	—	October 24, 2008	Kitt Peak	Spacewatch	AGN	1.2 km	MPC · JPL
588827	2008 UE_{174}	—	October 24, 2008	Kitt Peak	Spacewatch	·	1.5 km	MPC · JPL
588828	2008 UQ_{176}	—	October 24, 2008	Mount Lemmon	Mount Lemmon Survey	·	550 m	MPC · JPL
588829	2008 UR_{178}	—	October 24, 2008	Mount Lemmon	Mount Lemmon Survey	HNS	810 m	MPC · JPL
588830	2008 UL_{190}	—	October 25, 2008	Kitt Peak	Spacewatch	·	1.2 km	MPC · JPL
588831	2008 UR_{194}	—	October 26, 2008	Mount Lemmon	Mount Lemmon Survey	·	1.8 km	MPC · JPL
588832	2008 UV_{204}	—	September 30, 2008	Catalina	CSS	(1547)	1.3 km	MPC · JPL
588833	2008 UT_{206}	—	December 2, 2005	Mauna Kea	A. Boattini	·	1.8 km	MPC · JPL
588834	2008 UD_{214}	—	October 24, 2008	Catalina	CSS	ADE	1.8 km	MPC · JPL
588835	2008 UO_{223}	—	September 18, 2003	Kitt Peak	Spacewatch	·	1.5 km	MPC · JPL
588836	2008 UA_{225}	—	October 25, 2008	Kitt Peak	Spacewatch	EUN	970 m	MPC · JPL
588837	2008 UL_{231}	—	October 8, 2008	Mount Lemmon	Mount Lemmon Survey	L4	6.6 km	MPC · JPL
588838	2008 UJ_{235}	—	October 9, 2008	Kitt Peak	Spacewatch	·	490 m	MPC · JPL
588839	2008 UE_{237}	—	October 26, 2008	Kitt Peak	Spacewatch	·	610 m	MPC · JPL
588840	2008 UC_{241}	—	October 26, 2008	Kitt Peak	Spacewatch	·	560 m	MPC · JPL
588841	2008 UF_{257}	—	October 9, 2008	Catalina	CSS	·	1.5 km	MPC · JPL
588842	2008 UC_{261}	—	October 27, 2008	Mount Lemmon	Mount Lemmon Survey	·	1.4 km	MPC · JPL
588843	2008 UQ_{265}	—	October 28, 2008	Kitt Peak	Spacewatch	·	1.5 km	MPC · JPL
588844	2008 UE_{272}	—	March 26, 2006	Kitt Peak	Spacewatch	·	1.4 km	MPC · JPL
588845	2008 UJ_{274}	—	October 2, 2008	Mount Lemmon	Mount Lemmon Survey	·	1.2 km	MPC · JPL
588846	2008 UV_{274}	—	October 28, 2008	Kitt Peak	Spacewatch	·	1.8 km	MPC · JPL
588847	2008 UV_{277}	—	February 2, 2006	Kitt Peak	Spacewatch	·	1.4 km	MPC · JPL
588848	2008 UA_{280}	—	October 28, 2008	Mount Lemmon	Mount Lemmon Survey	(18466)	1.6 km	MPC · JPL
588849	2008 UR_{298}	—	October 29, 2008	Kitt Peak	Spacewatch	HOF	2.3 km	MPC · JPL
588850	2008 UW_{305}	—	October 30, 2008	Kitt Peak	Spacewatch	·	690 m	MPC · JPL
588851	2008 UJ_{308}	—	October 30, 2008	Kitt Peak	Spacewatch	·	2.2 km	MPC · JPL
588852	2008 UX_{311}	—	September 29, 2008	Mount Lemmon	Mount Lemmon Survey	·	480 m	MPC · JPL
588853	2008 UL_{318}	—	October 31, 2008	Mount Lemmon	Mount Lemmon Survey	·	1.9 km	MPC · JPL
588854	2008 UY_{318}	—	October 31, 2008	Mount Lemmon	Mount Lemmon Survey	·	500 m	MPC · JPL
588855	2008 UO_{326}	—	October 31, 2008	Mount Lemmon	Mount Lemmon Survey	·	1.9 km	MPC · JPL
588856	2008 UE_{352}	—	October 27, 2008	Kitt Peak	Spacewatch	·	1.5 km	MPC · JPL
588857	2008 UJ_{367}	—	May 5, 2006	Mount Lemmon	Mount Lemmon Survey	·	1.8 km	MPC · JPL
588858	2008 UQ_{372}	—	October 2, 2008	Kitt Peak	Spacewatch	·	1.4 km	MPC · JPL
588859	2008 UW_{374}	—	February 1, 2005	Kitt Peak	Spacewatch	·	1.4 km	MPC · JPL
588860	2008 UF_{375}	—	October 1, 2008	Catalina	CSS	ADE	1.7 km	MPC · JPL
588861	2008 UW_{376}	—	December 17, 1999	Kitt Peak	Spacewatch	L4	9.9 km	MPC · JPL
588862	2008 UE_{377}	—	October 21, 2008	Mount Lemmon	Mount Lemmon Survey	HNS	1.3 km	MPC · JPL
588863	2008 UO_{377}	—	October 30, 2008	Mount Lemmon	Mount Lemmon Survey	NEM	1.7 km	MPC · JPL
588864	2008 US_{377}	—	March 22, 2015	Haleakala	Pan-STARRS 1	·	1.4 km	MPC · JPL
588865	2008 UD_{378}	—	April 29, 2011	Mount Lemmon	Mount Lemmon Survey	·	1.2 km	MPC · JPL
588866	2008 UE_{378}	—	May 29, 2012	Mount Lemmon	Mount Lemmon Survey	·	1.3 km	MPC · JPL
588867	2008 UH_{378}	—	May 8, 2011	Mount Lemmon	Mount Lemmon Survey	MAR	900 m	MPC · JPL
588868	2008 UQ_{378}	—	October 24, 2008	Kitt Peak	Spacewatch	·	1.2 km	MPC · JPL
588869	2008 UZ_{378}	—	April 6, 2011	Mount Lemmon	Mount Lemmon Survey	·	1.1 km	MPC · JPL
588870	2008 UC_{379}	—	October 27, 2008	Mount Lemmon	Mount Lemmon Survey	·	1.3 km	MPC · JPL
588871	2008 UQ_{379}	—	March 20, 2010	Siding Spring	SSS	PHO	740 m	MPC · JPL
588872	2008 UE_{380}	—	March 28, 2011	Mount Lemmon	Mount Lemmon Survey	·	3.2 km	MPC · JPL
588873	2008 UQ_{381}	—	September 26, 2017	Haleakala	Pan-STARRS 1	·	1.4 km	MPC · JPL
588874	2008 UA_{384}	—	October 26, 2008	Mount Lemmon	Mount Lemmon Survey	·	1.2 km	MPC · JPL
588875	2008 UP_{389}	—	September 26, 2017	Haleakala	Pan-STARRS 1	WIT	790 m	MPC · JPL
588876	2008 UP_{390}	—	September 23, 2008	Mount Lemmon	Mount Lemmon Survey	·	850 m	MPC · JPL
588877	2008 US_{390}	—	October 24, 2008	Kitt Peak	Spacewatch	·	1.4 km	MPC · JPL
588878	2008 UJ_{392}	—	August 17, 2012	Haleakala	Pan-STARRS 1	·	1.3 km	MPC · JPL
588879	2008 UW_{395}	—	October 18, 2017	Haleakala	Pan-STARRS 1	·	1.4 km	MPC · JPL
588880	2008 UC_{396}	—	September 30, 2017	Haleakala	Pan-STARRS 1	·	1.8 km	MPC · JPL
588881	2008 UY_{396}	—	February 15, 2015	Haleakala	Pan-STARRS 1	AGN	1.0 km	MPC · JPL
588882	2008 UA_{397}	—	January 20, 2015	Haleakala	Pan-STARRS 1	·	1.4 km	MPC · JPL
588883	2008 UY_{400}	—	May 9, 2011	Mount Lemmon	Mount Lemmon Survey	·	1.3 km	MPC · JPL
588884	2008 UZ_{404}	—	October 25, 2008	Kitt Peak	Spacewatch	·	1.3 km	MPC · JPL
588885	2008 UM_{405}	—	October 28, 2008	Kitt Peak	Spacewatch	·	1.4 km	MPC · JPL
588886	2008 UR_{407}	—	October 28, 2008	Mount Lemmon	Mount Lemmon Survey	·	1.7 km	MPC · JPL
588887	2008 US_{414}	—	October 29, 2008	Kitt Peak	Spacewatch	·	1.4 km	MPC · JPL
588888	2008 VO_{6}	—	November 1, 2008	Mount Lemmon	Mount Lemmon Survey	·	1.6 km	MPC · JPL
588889	2008 VS_{7}	—	September 24, 2008	Mount Lemmon	Mount Lemmon Survey	·	1.3 km	MPC · JPL
588890	2008 VU_{25}	—	November 2, 2008	Kitt Peak	Spacewatch	NEM	1.8 km	MPC · JPL
588891	2008 VU_{26}	—	November 2, 2008	Kitt Peak	Spacewatch	·	970 m	MPC · JPL
588892	2008 VT_{27}	—	November 2, 2008	Kitt Peak	Spacewatch	·	1.7 km	MPC · JPL
588893	2008 VJ_{30}	—	November 2, 2008	Kitt Peak	Spacewatch	·	1.6 km	MPC · JPL
588894	2008 VY_{30}	—	November 2, 2008	Mount Lemmon	Mount Lemmon Survey	·	1.9 km	MPC · JPL
588895	2008 VV_{47}	—	September 20, 2003	Kitt Peak	Spacewatch	ADE	1.6 km	MPC · JPL
588896	2008 VG_{48}	—	November 3, 2008	Mount Lemmon	Mount Lemmon Survey	·	1.1 km	MPC · JPL
588897	2008 VX_{81}	—	November 2, 2008	Mount Lemmon	Mount Lemmon Survey	·	3.1 km	MPC · JPL
588898	2008 VQ_{83}	—	November 2, 2008	Mount Lemmon	Mount Lemmon Survey	·	960 m	MPC · JPL
588899	2008 VR_{83}	—	November 20, 2003	Palomar	NEAT	·	2.0 km	MPC · JPL
588900	2008 VX_{83}	—	August 26, 2012	Haleakala	Pan-STARRS 1	EUN	1.0 km	MPC · JPL

== 588901–589000 ==
back to top

Designation			Discovery			Properties		Ref
Permanent	Provisional	Named after	Date	Site	Discoverer(s)	Category	Diam.	Ref
588901	2008 VZ_{83}	—	February 14, 2010	Mount Lemmon	Mount Lemmon Survey	·	1.6 km	MPC · JPL
588902	2008 VB_{84}	—	March 21, 2015	Haleakala	Pan-STARRS 1	·	1.6 km	MPC · JPL
588903	2008 VU_{85}	—	November 1, 2008	Mount Lemmon	Mount Lemmon Survey	·	1.6 km	MPC · JPL
588904	2008 VS_{86}	—	January 28, 2015	Haleakala	Pan-STARRS 1	·	1.5 km	MPC · JPL
588905 Salvadornogueira	2008 VZ_{87}	Salvadornogueira	July 7, 2016	SONEAR	SONEAR	·	1.5 km	MPC · JPL
588906	2008 VL_{90}	—	November 28, 2013	Mount Lemmon	Mount Lemmon Survey	·	1.5 km	MPC · JPL
588907	2008 VU_{91}	—	August 24, 2012	Kitt Peak	Spacewatch	·	1.7 km	MPC · JPL
588908	2008 VH_{92}	—	August 20, 2001	Cerro Tololo	Deep Ecliptic Survey	·	640 m	MPC · JPL
588909	2008 VT_{94}	—	September 27, 2008	Mount Lemmon	Mount Lemmon Survey	·	1.4 km	MPC · JPL
588910	2008 VA_{95}	—	November 1, 2008	Mount Lemmon	Mount Lemmon Survey	·	1.4 km	MPC · JPL
588911	2008 VN_{97}	—	November 2, 2008	Mount Lemmon	Mount Lemmon Survey	·	1.2 km	MPC · JPL
588912	2008 VX_{99}	—	November 7, 2008	Mount Lemmon	Mount Lemmon Survey	GEF	820 m	MPC · JPL
588913	2008 WB_{8}	—	April 19, 2006	Kitt Peak	Spacewatch	·	1.9 km	MPC · JPL
588914	2008 WW_{37}	—	November 17, 2008	Kitt Peak	Spacewatch	·	610 m	MPC · JPL
588915	2008 WW_{82}	—	February 24, 2006	Kitt Peak	Spacewatch	BRA	1.7 km	MPC · JPL
588916	2008 WH_{84}	—	May 2, 2006	Kitt Peak	Spacewatch	HNS	1.0 km	MPC · JPL
588917	2008 WC_{91}	—	September 21, 2008	Kitt Peak	Spacewatch	·	1.2 km	MPC · JPL
588918	2008 WU_{108}	—	May 5, 2006	Kitt Peak	Spacewatch	HOF	2.2 km	MPC · JPL
588919	2008 WS_{130}	—	November 17, 2008	Kitt Peak	Spacewatch	·	670 m	MPC · JPL
588920	2008 WX_{142}	—	November 20, 2008	Kitt Peak	Spacewatch	·	2.2 km	MPC · JPL
588921	2008 WH_{143}	—	November 20, 2008	Kitt Peak	Spacewatch	·	1.7 km	MPC · JPL
588922	2008 WT_{144}	—	November 21, 2008	Mount Lemmon	Mount Lemmon Survey	·	640 m	MPC · JPL
588923	2008 WR_{145}	—	February 16, 2015	Haleakala	Pan-STARRS 1	·	1.5 km	MPC · JPL
588924	2008 WN_{149}	—	May 25, 2015	Haleakala	Pan-STARRS 2	·	1.6 km	MPC · JPL
588925	2008 WB_{151}	—	September 18, 2012	Mount Lemmon	Mount Lemmon Survey	AST	1.4 km	MPC · JPL
588926	2008 WA_{157}	—	November 19, 2008	Mount Lemmon	Mount Lemmon Survey	·	1.5 km	MPC · JPL
588927	2008 WL_{157}	—	November 21, 2008	Mount Lemmon	Mount Lemmon Survey	·	540 m	MPC · JPL
588928	2008 WP_{158}	—	November 20, 2008	Kitt Peak	Spacewatch	·	490 m	MPC · JPL
588929	2008 XE_{10}	—	December 2, 2008	Mount Lemmon	Mount Lemmon Survey	(5)	850 m	MPC · JPL
588930	2008 XG_{12}	—	November 3, 2008	Mount Lemmon	Mount Lemmon Survey	·	1.6 km	MPC · JPL
588931	2008 XX_{22}	—	November 20, 2008	Kitt Peak	Spacewatch	·	1.4 km	MPC · JPL
588932	2008 XH_{24}	—	September 10, 2007	Mount Lemmon	Mount Lemmon Survey	·	2.0 km	MPC · JPL
588933	2008 XX_{24}	—	December 4, 2008	Mount Lemmon	Mount Lemmon Survey	·	1.4 km	MPC · JPL
588934	2008 XD_{28}	—	October 29, 2003	Kitt Peak	Deep Lens Survey	·	1.5 km	MPC · JPL
588935	2008 XC_{34}	—	October 29, 2008	Kitt Peak	Spacewatch	·	1.4 km	MPC · JPL
588936	2008 XC_{41}	—	December 2, 2008	Kitt Peak	Spacewatch	·	2.1 km	MPC · JPL
588937	2008 XN_{44}	—	December 3, 2008	Mount Lemmon	Mount Lemmon Survey	·	2.0 km	MPC · JPL
588938	2008 XE_{51}	—	November 24, 2008	Kitt Peak	Spacewatch	·	2.4 km	MPC · JPL
588939	2008 XO_{57}	—	December 1, 2008	Mount Lemmon	Mount Lemmon Survey	·	2.0 km	MPC · JPL
588940	2008 XV_{57}	—	December 3, 2008	Mount Lemmon	Mount Lemmon Survey	·	1.7 km	MPC · JPL
588941	2008 XW_{57}	—	September 17, 2012	Mount Lemmon	Mount Lemmon Survey	·	1.5 km	MPC · JPL
588942	2008 XG_{59}	—	December 8, 2008	Mount Lemmon	Mount Lemmon Survey	·	470 m	MPC · JPL
588943	2008 XA_{64}	—	January 1, 2014	Kitt Peak	Spacewatch	·	1.4 km	MPC · JPL
588944	2008 XZ_{65}	—	December 3, 2008	Mount Lemmon	Mount Lemmon Survey	·	530 m	MPC · JPL
588945	2008 XG_{66}	—	December 7, 2008	Mount Lemmon	Mount Lemmon Survey	·	1.4 km	MPC · JPL
588946	2008 YC_{4}	—	December 22, 2008	Calar Alto	F. Hormuth	·	680 m	MPC · JPL
588947	2008 YW_{11}	—	November 30, 2008	Kitt Peak	Spacewatch	·	1.4 km	MPC · JPL
588948	2008 YX_{17}	—	December 21, 2008	Mount Lemmon	Mount Lemmon Survey	·	530 m	MPC · JPL
588949	2008 YB_{20}	—	December 19, 2003	Kitt Peak	Spacewatch	·	2.1 km	MPC · JPL
588950	2008 YS_{24}	—	May 24, 2003	Kitt Peak	Spacewatch	·	1.3 km	MPC · JPL
588951	2008 YE_{34}	—	December 20, 2008	Lulin	LUSS	·	1.4 km	MPC · JPL
588952	2008 YB_{37}	—	August 16, 2002	Kitt Peak	Spacewatch	HOF	2.3 km	MPC · JPL
588953	2008 YL_{43}	—	November 19, 2008	Mount Lemmon	Mount Lemmon Survey	EUN	1.2 km	MPC · JPL
588954	2008 YX_{43}	—	December 1, 2008	Kitt Peak	Spacewatch	·	1.3 km	MPC · JPL
588955	2008 YD_{46}	—	October 8, 2007	Mount Lemmon	Mount Lemmon Survey	KOR	1.1 km	MPC · JPL
588956	2008 YK_{63}	—	December 30, 2008	Mount Lemmon	Mount Lemmon Survey	V	520 m	MPC · JPL
588957	2008 YD_{70}	—	December 29, 2008	Mount Lemmon	Mount Lemmon Survey	·	1.5 km	MPC · JPL
588958	2008 YW_{70}	—	December 29, 2008	Mount Lemmon	Mount Lemmon Survey	·	1.7 km	MPC · JPL
588959	2008 YL_{77}	—	December 30, 2008	Mount Lemmon	Mount Lemmon Survey	·	1.7 km	MPC · JPL
588960	2008 YJ_{80}	—	December 30, 2008	Mount Lemmon	Mount Lemmon Survey	·	1.4 km	MPC · JPL
588961	2008 YS_{82}	—	December 31, 2008	Kitt Peak	Spacewatch	·	650 m	MPC · JPL
588962	2008 YM_{86}	—	December 5, 2008	Kitt Peak	Spacewatch	HOF	2.2 km	MPC · JPL
588963	2008 YX_{92}	—	December 29, 2008	Kitt Peak	Spacewatch	·	1.9 km	MPC · JPL
588964	2008 YZ_{92}	—	March 5, 2002	Apache Point	SDSS Collaboration	NYS	830 m	MPC · JPL
588965	2008 YK_{95}	—	December 29, 2008	Kitt Peak	Spacewatch	·	490 m	MPC · JPL
588966	2008 YZ_{102}	—	December 21, 2008	Mount Lemmon	Mount Lemmon Survey	·	2.0 km	MPC · JPL
588967	2008 YW_{129}	—	December 31, 2008	Kitt Peak	Spacewatch	·	630 m	MPC · JPL
588968	2008 YO_{132}	—	October 1, 2003	Kitt Peak	Spacewatch	·	1.6 km	MPC · JPL
588969	2008 YQ_{132}	—	December 31, 2008	Mount Lemmon	Mount Lemmon Survey	H	500 m	MPC · JPL
588970	2008 YM_{134}	—	December 4, 2008	Kitt Peak	Spacewatch	·	1.3 km	MPC · JPL
588971	2008 YA_{136}	—	October 21, 2003	Palomar	NEAT	·	1.6 km	MPC · JPL
588972	2008 YC_{138}	—	December 4, 2008	Mount Lemmon	Mount Lemmon Survey	·	1.4 km	MPC · JPL
588973	2008 YY_{139}	—	December 30, 2008	Kitt Peak	Spacewatch	MRX	750 m	MPC · JPL
588974	2008 YP_{140}	—	December 30, 2008	Mount Lemmon	Mount Lemmon Survey	·	1.6 km	MPC · JPL
588975	2008 YR_{140}	—	December 30, 2008	Mount Lemmon	Mount Lemmon Survey	PAD	1.2 km	MPC · JPL
588976	2008 YV_{153}	—	December 21, 2008	Mount Lemmon	Mount Lemmon Survey	·	1.7 km	MPC · JPL
588977	2008 YX_{164}	—	December 30, 2008	Catalina	CSS	H	520 m	MPC · JPL
588978	2008 YH_{176}	—	December 30, 2008	Mount Lemmon	Mount Lemmon Survey	(2076)	590 m	MPC · JPL
588979	2008 YS_{176}	—	December 31, 2008	Mount Lemmon	Mount Lemmon Survey	·	1.9 km	MPC · JPL
588980	2008 YT_{176}	—	October 8, 2012	Haleakala	Pan-STARRS 1	·	1.4 km	MPC · JPL
588981	2008 YO_{177}	—	October 3, 2011	XuYi	PMO NEO Survey Program	·	540 m	MPC · JPL
588982	2008 YA_{182}	—	December 21, 2008	Kitt Peak	Spacewatch	·	470 m	MPC · JPL
588983	2008 YC_{184}	—	March 12, 2014	Mount Lemmon	Mount Lemmon Survey	·	1.1 km	MPC · JPL
588984	2008 YJ_{185}	—	December 22, 2008	Mount Lemmon	Mount Lemmon Survey	·	1.8 km	MPC · JPL
588985	2008 YL_{189}	—	December 22, 2008	Kitt Peak	Spacewatch	AGN	910 m	MPC · JPL
588986	2008 YD_{190}	—	December 29, 2008	Kitt Peak	Spacewatch	·	1.2 km	MPC · JPL
588987	2008 YF_{193}	—	October 10, 2007	Mount Lemmon	Mount Lemmon Survey	KOR	1.2 km	MPC · JPL
588988	2009 AQ_{5}	—	January 1, 2009	Kitt Peak	Spacewatch	·	550 m	MPC · JPL
588989	2009 AX_{8}	—	January 2, 2009	Kitt Peak	Spacewatch	·	1.3 km	MPC · JPL
588990	2009 AT_{10}	—	January 2, 2009	Mount Lemmon	Mount Lemmon Survey	MRX	940 m	MPC · JPL
588991	2009 AN_{11}	—	September 13, 2007	Mount Lemmon	Mount Lemmon Survey	KOR	1.2 km	MPC · JPL
588992	2009 AS_{13}	—	January 2, 2009	Mount Lemmon	Mount Lemmon Survey	·	2.0 km	MPC · JPL
588993	2009 AD_{14}	—	November 26, 2003	Kitt Peak	Spacewatch	·	1.5 km	MPC · JPL
588994	2009 AZ_{23}	—	September 14, 2002	Kitt Peak	Spacewatch	KOR	1.1 km	MPC · JPL
588995	2009 AC_{27}	—	January 2, 2009	Kitt Peak	Spacewatch	·	1.5 km	MPC · JPL
588996	2009 AY_{29}	—	December 21, 2008	Kitt Peak	Spacewatch	·	2.4 km	MPC · JPL
588997	2009 AY_{39}	—	October 14, 2007	Mount Lemmon	Mount Lemmon Survey	·	2.1 km	MPC · JPL
588998	2009 AJ_{40}	—	October 12, 2007	Kitt Peak	Spacewatch	KOR	1.1 km	MPC · JPL
588999	2009 AV_{52}	—	January 15, 2009	Kitt Peak	Spacewatch	·	1.0 km	MPC · JPL
589000	2009 AP_{54}	—	August 28, 2014	Haleakala	Pan-STARRS 1	·	710 m	MPC · JPL

back to top

== Meaning of names ==
As minor planet discoveries are confirmed, they are given a permanent number by the IAU's Minor Planet Center (MPC), and the discoverers can then submit names for them, following the IAU's naming conventions. The list below concerns those minor planets in the specified number-range that have received names, and explains the meanings of those names.

Official naming citations of newly named small Solar System bodies are approved and published in a bulletin by IAU's Working Group for Small Bodies Nomenclature (WGSBN). Before May 2021, citations were published in MPC's Minor Planet Circulars for many decades. Recent citations can also be found on the JPL Small-Body Database (SBDB). Until his death in 2016, German astronomer Lutz D. Schmadel compiled these citations into the Dictionary of Minor Planet Names (DMP) and regularly updated the collection.

Based on Paul Herget's The Names of the Minor Planets, Schmadel also researched the unclear origin of numerous asteroids, most of which had been named prior to World War II. This article incorporates text from this source, which is in the public domain: SBDB New namings may only be added to this list below after official publication as the preannouncement of names is condemned. The WGSBN publishes a comprehensive guideline for the naming rules of non-cometary small Solar System bodies.

Named minor planet	Provisional	This minor planet was named for...	Ref · Catalog
588108 Boteropop	2007 JX	Laurent Maupoint (b. 1975) is a French street artist living in Angers. He created the character Botero PoP which he adapts to a multitude of contexts inspired by cartoons, films, mythologies, video games, politics and current events.	IAU · 588108
588255 Hantang	2007 TQ_{376}	The Han dynasty and the Tang dynasty (Hantang), important periods in ancient China	IAU · 588255
588905 Salvadornogueira	2008 VZ_{87}	Salvador Nogueira, Brazilian science journalist and author.	IAU · 588905
