= List of minor planets: 584001–585000 =

The following is a partial list of minor planets, running from minor-planet number 584001 through 585000, inclusive. The primary data for this and other partial lists is based on JPL's "Small-Body Orbital Elements" and data available from the Minor Planet Center. Critical list information is also provided by the MPC, unless otherwise specified from Lowell Observatory. A detailed description of the table's columns and additional sources are given on the main page including a complete list of every page in this series, and a statistical break-up on the dynamical classification of minor planets.

Also see the summary list of all named bodies in numerical and alphabetical order, and the corresponding naming citations for the number range of this particular list. New namings may only be added to this list after official publication, as the preannouncement of names is condemned by the Working Group for Small Bodies Nomenclature of the International Astronomical Union.

Near-Earth obj.	MBA (inner)	MBA (outer)	Centaur
Mars-crosser	MBA (middle)	Jupiter trojan	Trans-Neptunian obj.
Unclassified

== 584001–584100 ==
Designation			Discovery			Properties		Ref
Permanent	Provisional	Named after	Date	Site	Discoverer(s)	Category	Diam.	Ref
584001	2016 QA_{105}	—	August 31, 2016	Mount Lemmon	Mount Lemmon Survey	·	1.9 km	MPC · JPL
584002	2016 QE_{105}	—	August 30, 2016	Haleakala	Pan-STARRS 1	EOS	1.4 km	MPC · JPL
584003	2016 QH_{105}	—	August 29, 2016	Mount Lemmon	Mount Lemmon Survey	·	2.2 km	MPC · JPL
584004	2016 QW_{105}	—	August 28, 2016	Mount Lemmon	Mount Lemmon Survey	·	1.4 km	MPC · JPL
584005	2016 QX_{105}	—	August 30, 2016	Mount Lemmon	Mount Lemmon Survey	EOS	1.9 km	MPC · JPL
584006	2016 QS_{106}	—	August 30, 2016	Haleakala	Pan-STARRS 1	·	2.4 km	MPC · JPL
584007	2016 QX_{106}	—	August 27, 2016	Haleakala	Pan-STARRS 1	EOS	1.5 km	MPC · JPL
584008	2016 QW_{110}	—	August 30, 2016	Mount Lemmon	Mount Lemmon Survey	·	2.4 km	MPC · JPL
584009	2016 RB	—	July 31, 2005	Palomar	NEAT	·	2.4 km	MPC · JPL
584010	2016 RO_{2}	—	January 24, 2015	Haleakala	Pan-STARRS 1	H	490 m	MPC · JPL
584011	2016 RP_{3}	—	February 27, 2015	Haleakala	Pan-STARRS 1	V	530 m	MPC · JPL
584012	2016 RV_{4}	—	May 26, 2015	Haleakala	Pan-STARRS 1	HNS	1.5 km	MPC · JPL
584013	2016 RL_{6}	—	October 11, 2006	Palomar	NEAT	·	3.1 km	MPC · JPL
584014	2016 RY_{6}	—	November 25, 2011	Haleakala	Pan-STARRS 1	H	700 m	MPC · JPL
584015	2016 RM_{7}	—	October 20, 2006	Kitt Peak	Spacewatch	·	2.1 km	MPC · JPL
584016	2016 RO_{8}	—	July 29, 2005	Palomar	NEAT	EOS	2.5 km	MPC · JPL
584017	2016 RG_{10}	—	September 4, 2011	Haleakala	Pan-STARRS 1	·	1.8 km	MPC · JPL
584018	2016 RU_{11}	—	December 11, 2002	Palomar	NEAT	·	2.4 km	MPC · JPL
584019	2016 RY_{11}	—	June 7, 2016	Haleakala	Pan-STARRS 1	·	2.4 km	MPC · JPL
584020	2016 RB_{12}	—	May 18, 2015	Haleakala	Pan-STARRS 1	EOS	1.4 km	MPC · JPL
584021	2016 RK_{14}	—	November 14, 2007	Kitt Peak	Spacewatch	KOR	1.1 km	MPC · JPL
584022	2016 RH_{15}	—	September 29, 2011	Mount Lemmon	Mount Lemmon Survey	EOS	1.7 km	MPC · JPL
584023	2016 RA_{16}	—	November 3, 2005	Mount Lemmon	Mount Lemmon Survey	·	2.1 km	MPC · JPL
584024	2016 RF_{16}	—	April 4, 2014	Mount Lemmon	Mount Lemmon Survey	EOS	1.8 km	MPC · JPL
584025	2016 RL_{16}	—	July 8, 2005	Kitt Peak	Spacewatch	EOS	2.1 km	MPC · JPL
584026	2016 RU_{16}	—	December 15, 2001	Apache Point	SDSS Collaboration	EOS	1.9 km	MPC · JPL
584027	2016 RD_{19}	—	December 20, 2014	Haleakala	Pan-STARRS 1	H	400 m	MPC · JPL
584028	2016 RM_{23}	—	November 3, 2011	Kitt Peak	Spacewatch	·	2.3 km	MPC · JPL
584029	2016 RK_{26}	—	January 15, 2013	ESA OGS	ESA OGS	·	3.2 km	MPC · JPL
584030	2016 RS_{26}	—	November 18, 2006	Mount Lemmon	Mount Lemmon Survey	·	2.6 km	MPC · JPL
584031	2016 RC_{29}	—	March 28, 2015	Haleakala	Pan-STARRS 1	·	1.0 km	MPC · JPL
584032	2016 RB_{30}	—	September 21, 2011	Catalina	CSS	H	440 m	MPC · JPL
584033	2016 RP_{30}	—	August 1, 2000	Cerro Tololo	Deep Ecliptic Survey	·	2.2 km	MPC · JPL
584034	2016 RQ_{31}	—	August 30, 2006	Anderson Mesa	LONEOS	·	540 m	MPC · JPL
584035	2016 RS_{31}	—	September 10, 2016	Mount Lemmon	Mount Lemmon Survey	·	2.9 km	MPC · JPL
584036	2016 RB_{32}	—	July 4, 2010	Mount Lemmon	Mount Lemmon Survey	·	3.0 km	MPC · JPL
584037	2016 RE_{32}	—	May 21, 2015	Haleakala	Pan-STARRS 1	·	2.0 km	MPC · JPL
584038	2016 RV_{32}	—	March 24, 2014	Haleakala	Pan-STARRS 1	·	2.5 km	MPC · JPL
584039	2016 RE_{35}	—	August 30, 2005	Kitt Peak	Spacewatch	·	2.5 km	MPC · JPL
584040	2016 RO_{35}	—	October 3, 2006	Mount Lemmon	Mount Lemmon Survey	·	580 m	MPC · JPL
584041	2016 RR_{35}	—	July 14, 2016	Haleakala	Pan-STARRS 1	MAS	560 m	MPC · JPL
584042	2016 RW_{37}	—	October 20, 1998	Kitt Peak	Spacewatch	·	1.9 km	MPC · JPL
584043	2016 RZ_{37}	—	September 28, 1994	Kitt Peak	Spacewatch	·	2.8 km	MPC · JPL
584044	2016 RK_{38}	—	October 27, 2011	Mount Lemmon	Mount Lemmon Survey	·	2.4 km	MPC · JPL
584045	2016 RX_{38}	—	August 30, 2005	Kitt Peak	Spacewatch	·	2.2 km	MPC · JPL
584046	2016 RG_{41}	—	January 25, 2015	Haleakala	Pan-STARRS 1	H	450 m	MPC · JPL
584047	2016 RX_{41}	—	August 30, 2005	Palomar	NEAT	EOS	2.3 km	MPC · JPL
584048	2016 RA_{42}	—	August 30, 2005	Kitt Peak	Spacewatch	·	3.3 km	MPC · JPL
584049	2016 RH_{43}	—	October 1, 2005	Mount Lemmon	Mount Lemmon Survey	·	2.6 km	MPC · JPL
584050	2016 RV_{44}	—	September 9, 2007	Kitt Peak	Spacewatch	·	1.6 km	MPC · JPL
584051	2016 RC_{45}	—	October 24, 2011	Haleakala	Pan-STARRS 1	·	1.9 km	MPC · JPL
584052	2016 RZ_{45}	—	November 30, 2011	Mount Lemmon	Mount Lemmon Survey	·	3.4 km	MPC · JPL
584053	2016 RB_{46}	—	September 12, 2016	Mount Lemmon	Mount Lemmon Survey	·	2.2 km	MPC · JPL
584054	2016 RE_{46}	—	September 10, 2016	Mount Lemmon	Mount Lemmon Survey	EOS	2.1 km	MPC · JPL
584055	2016 RF_{46}	—	October 24, 2011	Haleakala	Pan-STARRS 1	·	2.0 km	MPC · JPL
584056	2016 RH_{46}	—	November 7, 2008	Mount Lemmon	Mount Lemmon Survey	·	1.6 km	MPC · JPL
584057	2016 RP_{46}	—	September 30, 2011	Kitt Peak	Spacewatch	·	2.3 km	MPC · JPL
584058	2016 RD_{47}	—	February 21, 2002	Kitt Peak	Spacewatch	·	3.4 km	MPC · JPL
584059	2016 RK_{47}	—	October 24, 2011	Haleakala	Pan-STARRS 1	·	2.0 km	MPC · JPL
584060	2016 RT_{47}	—	September 18, 2001	Apache Point	SDSS Collaboration	·	2.2 km	MPC · JPL
584061	2016 RV_{47}	—	October 22, 2006	Palomar	NEAT	·	2.0 km	MPC · JPL
584062	2016 RE_{48}	—	December 27, 2006	Mount Lemmon	Mount Lemmon Survey	·	2.2 km	MPC · JPL
584063	2016 RU_{48}	—	May 22, 2015	Haleakala	Pan-STARRS 1	·	2.4 km	MPC · JPL
584064	2016 RE_{49}	—	September 12, 2016	Mount Lemmon	Mount Lemmon Survey	·	2.6 km	MPC · JPL
584065	2016 RF_{49}	—	April 25, 2015	Haleakala	Pan-STARRS 1	·	1.7 km	MPC · JPL
584066	2016 RQ_{49}	—	October 2, 2005	Palomar	NEAT	·	3.0 km	MPC · JPL
584067	2016 RU_{49}	—	August 30, 2016	Mount Lemmon	Mount Lemmon Survey	·	2.7 km	MPC · JPL
584068	2016 RB_{50}	—	September 2, 2016	Mount Lemmon	Mount Lemmon Survey	VER	2.7 km	MPC · JPL
584069	2016 RL_{50}	—	September 12, 2016	Haleakala	Pan-STARRS 1	·	3.0 km	MPC · JPL
584070	2016 RO_{51}	—	February 10, 1996	Kitt Peak	Spacewatch	·	1.4 km	MPC · JPL
584071	2016 RW_{61}	—	September 6, 2016	Mount Lemmon	Mount Lemmon Survey	·	2.0 km	MPC · JPL
584072	2016 SB_{2}	—	October 1, 2011	Mount Lemmon	Mount Lemmon Survey	H	530 m	MPC · JPL
584073	2016 SV_{2}	—	November 6, 2008	Kitt Peak	Spacewatch	H	490 m	MPC · JPL
584074	2016 SO_{4}	—	July 13, 2016	Haleakala	Pan-STARRS 1	·	2.2 km	MPC · JPL
584075	2016 SB_{5}	—	June 26, 2011	Mount Lemmon	Mount Lemmon Survey	·	1.6 km	MPC · JPL
584076	2016 SS_{6}	—	February 13, 2008	Kitt Peak	Spacewatch	·	3.0 km	MPC · JPL
584077	2016 SL_{7}	—	December 16, 2004	Kitt Peak	Spacewatch	·	1.9 km	MPC · JPL
584078	2016 SC_{8}	—	October 24, 2011	Haleakala	Pan-STARRS 1	·	2.3 km	MPC · JPL
584079	2016 SS_{8}	—	September 19, 2011	Haleakala	Pan-STARRS 1	·	1.6 km	MPC · JPL
584080	2016 SJ_{11}	—	October 21, 2011	Kitt Peak	Spacewatch	·	2.0 km	MPC · JPL
584081	2016 SN_{11}	—	October 5, 2005	Catalina	CSS	·	2.7 km	MPC · JPL
584082	2016 SS_{11}	—	October 28, 2011	Mount Lemmon	Mount Lemmon Survey	(1298)	2.3 km	MPC · JPL
584083	2016 SU_{12}	—	August 16, 2016	Haleakala	Pan-STARRS 1	·	2.6 km	MPC · JPL
584084	2016 SW_{12}	—	October 31, 2011	Mayhill-ISON	L. Elenin	EOS	1.8 km	MPC · JPL
584085	2016 SY_{13}	—	November 9, 2013	Haleakala	Pan-STARRS 1	·	450 m	MPC · JPL
584086	2016 SD_{16}	—	August 31, 2005	Kitt Peak	Spacewatch	·	2.1 km	MPC · JPL
584087	2016 SP_{16}	—	January 25, 2015	Haleakala	Pan-STARRS 1	TIR	2.6 km	MPC · JPL
584088	2016 SX_{17}	—	September 21, 2000	Kitt Peak	Spacewatch	·	2.7 km	MPC · JPL
584089	2016 SA_{20}	—	December 22, 2012	Haleakala	Pan-STARRS 1	EOS	1.7 km	MPC · JPL
584090	2016 SK_{20}	—	September 4, 2016	Mount Lemmon	Mount Lemmon Survey	·	940 m	MPC · JPL
584091	2016 SU_{20}	—	August 2, 2016	Haleakala	Pan-STARRS 1	EOS	1.7 km	MPC · JPL
584092	2016 SD_{22}	—	October 3, 2006	Mount Lemmon	Mount Lemmon Survey	·	1.5 km	MPC · JPL
584093	2016 ST_{22}	—	May 25, 2015	Haleakala	Pan-STARRS 1	·	2.5 km	MPC · JPL
584094	2016 SE_{23}	—	April 21, 2009	Kitt Peak	Spacewatch	·	2.3 km	MPC · JPL
584095	2016 SE_{24}	—	September 14, 2005	Kitt Peak	Spacewatch	·	2.2 km	MPC · JPL
584096	2016 SN_{24}	—	September 23, 2011	Haleakala	Pan-STARRS 1	·	2.2 km	MPC · JPL
584097	2016 SN_{25}	—	November 16, 2009	Mount Lemmon	Mount Lemmon Survey	CLA	1.1 km	MPC · JPL
584098	2016 SS_{28}	—	February 28, 2008	Mount Lemmon	Mount Lemmon Survey	THM	2.6 km	MPC · JPL
584099	2016 SD_{29}	—	September 18, 2011	Mount Lemmon	Mount Lemmon Survey	·	1.9 km	MPC · JPL
584100	2016 SS_{29}	—	April 10, 2013	Haleakala	Pan-STARRS 1	·	3.1 km	MPC · JPL

== 584101–584200 ==
back to top

Designation			Discovery			Properties		Ref
Permanent	Provisional	Named after	Date	Site	Discoverer(s)	Category	Diam.	Ref
584101	2016 SD_{30}	—	May 21, 2015	Haleakala	Pan-STARRS 1	TIR	2.5 km	MPC · JPL
584102	2016 SE_{30}	—	August 12, 2010	Kitt Peak	Spacewatch	·	2.9 km	MPC · JPL
584103	2016 SU_{30}	—	May 16, 2009	Kitt Peak	Spacewatch	EOS	2.1 km	MPC · JPL
584104	2016 SW_{30}	—	July 24, 2015	Haleakala	Pan-STARRS 1	·	2.3 km	MPC · JPL
584105	2016 SL_{31}	—	August 5, 2005	Palomar	NEAT	·	3.2 km	MPC · JPL
584106	2016 SU_{32}	—	October 21, 2011	Mount Lemmon	Mount Lemmon Survey	·	1.9 km	MPC · JPL
584107	2016 SP_{33}	—	April 25, 2015	Haleakala	Pan-STARRS 1	·	2.0 km	MPC · JPL
584108	2016 SG_{34}	—	September 23, 2011	Kitt Peak	Spacewatch	EOS	1.5 km	MPC · JPL
584109	2016 SK_{34}	—	March 20, 2007	Catalina	CSS	H	480 m	MPC · JPL
584110	2016 SJ_{36}	—	November 29, 2011	Kitt Peak	Spacewatch	HYG	2.4 km	MPC · JPL
584111	2016 SN_{36}	—	April 18, 2015	Haleakala	Pan-STARRS 1	MAR	850 m	MPC · JPL
584112	2016 SM_{38}	—	August 2, 2016	Haleakala	Pan-STARRS 1	·	2.7 km	MPC · JPL
584113	2016 SO_{38}	—	March 24, 2014	Haleakala	Pan-STARRS 1	·	2.0 km	MPC · JPL
584114	2016 SC_{39}	—	August 19, 2006	Kitt Peak	Spacewatch	KOR	1.2 km	MPC · JPL
584115	2016 SF_{40}	—	March 21, 2015	Haleakala	Pan-STARRS 1	·	1.1 km	MPC · JPL
584116	2016 SD_{41}	—	June 7, 2015	Mount Lemmon	Mount Lemmon Survey	·	2.2 km	MPC · JPL
584117	2016 SL_{41}	—	August 27, 2016	Haleakala	Pan-STARRS 1	·	1.0 km	MPC · JPL
584118	2016 SZ_{41}	—	February 26, 2014	Haleakala	Pan-STARRS 1	EOS	1.7 km	MPC · JPL
584119	2016 SW_{42}	—	September 12, 2005	Kitt Peak	Spacewatch	THM	1.6 km	MPC · JPL
584120	2016 SL_{43}	—	October 13, 2007	Mount Lemmon	Mount Lemmon Survey	·	1.4 km	MPC · JPL
584121	2016 SQ_{43}	—	November 22, 2011	Catalina	CSS	·	2.1 km	MPC · JPL
584122	2016 SZ_{43}	—	February 10, 2013	Haleakala	Pan-STARRS 1	EOS	1.8 km	MPC · JPL
584123	2016 SM_{44}	—	September 27, 2016	Haleakala	Pan-STARRS 1	·	2.6 km	MPC · JPL
584124	2016 SZ_{44}	—	September 26, 2005	Kitt Peak	Spacewatch	·	2.2 km	MPC · JPL
584125	2016 SZ_{45}	—	August 27, 2005	Palomar	NEAT	EOS	1.7 km	MPC · JPL
584126	2016 SK_{46}	—	April 18, 2015	Haleakala	Pan-STARRS 1	PHO	890 m	MPC · JPL
584127	2016 SR_{48}	—	April 22, 2009	Mount Lemmon	Mount Lemmon Survey	·	2.0 km	MPC · JPL
584128	2016 SB_{51}	—	April 5, 2014	Haleakala	Pan-STARRS 1	·	2.7 km	MPC · JPL
584129	2016 SY_{51}	—	February 8, 2013	Haleakala	Pan-STARRS 1	·	2.5 km	MPC · JPL
584130	2016 SC_{52}	—	October 24, 2011	Haleakala	Pan-STARRS 1	·	2.9 km	MPC · JPL
584131	2016 SL_{52}	—	July 30, 2005	Palomar	NEAT	·	2.0 km	MPC · JPL
584132	2016 SA_{53}	—	June 12, 2015	Haleakala	Pan-STARRS 1	·	1.4 km	MPC · JPL
584133	2016 SL_{55}	—	September 30, 2016	Haleakala	Pan-STARRS 1	·	2.6 km	MPC · JPL
584134	2016 SW_{75}	—	September 22, 2016	Mount Lemmon	Mount Lemmon Survey	·	2.3 km	MPC · JPL
584135	2016 SD_{76}	—	September 27, 2016	Haleakala	Pan-STARRS 1	·	2.8 km	MPC · JPL
584136	2016 SY_{80}	—	September 25, 2016	Haleakala	Pan-STARRS 1	·	2.3 km	MPC · JPL
584137	2016 TE_{1}	—	January 18, 2013	Mount Lemmon	Mount Lemmon Survey	·	2.8 km	MPC · JPL
584138	2016 TE_{3}	—	August 28, 2005	Siding Spring	SSS	·	2.7 km	MPC · JPL
584139	2016 TY_{3}	—	November 14, 2003	Palomar	NEAT	·	2.5 km	MPC · JPL
584140	2016 TK_{5}	—	September 18, 2010	Kitt Peak	Spacewatch	·	3.6 km	MPC · JPL
584141	2016 TA_{6}	—	October 23, 2011	Haleakala	Pan-STARRS 1	·	2.6 km	MPC · JPL
584142	2016 TF_{6}	—	September 16, 2010	Mount Lemmon	Mount Lemmon Survey	T_{j} (2.94)	2.7 km	MPC · JPL
584143	2016 TH_{6}	—	February 25, 2007	Kitt Peak	Spacewatch	(5651)	2.9 km	MPC · JPL
584144	2016 TV_{6}	—	May 7, 2014	Haleakala	Pan-STARRS 1	EOS	2.1 km	MPC · JPL
584145	2016 TH_{7}	—	October 17, 2011	Kitt Peak	Spacewatch	EOS	1.7 km	MPC · JPL
584146	2016 TG_{8}	—	December 30, 2008	Mount Lemmon	Mount Lemmon Survey	·	1.6 km	MPC · JPL
584147	2016 TX_{9}	—	November 28, 2014	Haleakala	Pan-STARRS 1	H	570 m	MPC · JPL
584148	2016 TD_{12}	—	October 5, 2011	Piszkéstető	K. Sárneczky	·	1.6 km	MPC · JPL
584149	2016 TE_{14}	—	June 17, 2005	Mount Lemmon	Mount Lemmon Survey	·	2.6 km	MPC · JPL
584150	2016 TB_{17}	—	October 25, 2005	Catalina	CSS	H	550 m	MPC · JPL
584151	2016 TC_{17}	—	September 27, 2016	Mount Lemmon	Mount Lemmon Survey	·	2.2 km	MPC · JPL
584152	2016 TU_{17}	—	February 20, 2015	Haleakala	Pan-STARRS 1	H	410 m	MPC · JPL
584153	2016 TC_{21}	—	January 19, 2008	Mount Lemmon	Mount Lemmon Survey	·	2.8 km	MPC · JPL
584154	2016 TJ_{21}	—	May 19, 2015	Mount Lemmon	Mount Lemmon Survey	·	1.7 km	MPC · JPL
584155	2016 TW_{22}	—	March 30, 2008	Kitt Peak	Spacewatch	·	2.8 km	MPC · JPL
584156	2016 TL_{23}	—	August 31, 2005	Kitt Peak	Spacewatch	·	2.4 km	MPC · JPL
584157	2016 TT_{24}	—	April 23, 2014	Haleakala	Pan-STARRS 1	·	2.9 km	MPC · JPL
584158	2016 TR_{25}	—	November 1, 2005	Kitt Peak	Spacewatch	·	2.7 km	MPC · JPL
584159	2016 TW_{25}	—	September 1, 2005	Kitt Peak	Spacewatch	THM	1.9 km	MPC · JPL
584160	2016 TG_{27}	—	March 28, 2015	Haleakala	Pan-STARRS 1	·	1.1 km	MPC · JPL
584161	2016 TW_{29}	—	September 27, 2016	Mount Lemmon	Mount Lemmon Survey	·	3.5 km	MPC · JPL
584162	2016 TA_{30}	—	September 1, 2005	Palomar	NEAT	·	3.3 km	MPC · JPL
584163	2016 TF_{30}	—	January 14, 2002	Kitt Peak	Spacewatch	EOS	2.1 km	MPC · JPL
584164	2016 TF_{32}	—	July 18, 2012	Catalina	CSS	·	1.2 km	MPC · JPL
584165	2016 TZ_{32}	—	October 1, 2016	Mount Lemmon	Mount Lemmon Survey	·	1.8 km	MPC · JPL
584166	2016 TG_{34}	—	November 24, 2011	Mount Lemmon	Mount Lemmon Survey	·	3.0 km	MPC · JPL
584167	2016 TV_{34}	—	September 27, 2011	Mount Lemmon	Mount Lemmon Survey	·	1.6 km	MPC · JPL
584168	2016 TZ_{34}	—	October 20, 2011	Kitt Peak	Spacewatch	EOS	1.3 km	MPC · JPL
584169	2016 TD_{35}	—	October 24, 2011	Haleakala	Pan-STARRS 1	·	2.1 km	MPC · JPL
584170	2016 TN_{35}	—	September 5, 2016	Mount Lemmon	Mount Lemmon Survey	·	2.5 km	MPC · JPL
584171	2016 TF_{36}	—	December 2, 2005	Mauna Kea	A. Boattini	·	1.4 km	MPC · JPL
584172	2016 TJ_{36}	—	October 21, 2011	Kitt Peak	Spacewatch	·	2.2 km	MPC · JPL
584173	2016 TO_{38}	—	September 14, 2005	Kitt Peak	Spacewatch	·	2.5 km	MPC · JPL
584174	2016 TH_{40}	—	May 10, 2003	Kitt Peak	Spacewatch	HYG	2.6 km	MPC · JPL
584175	2016 TJ_{40}	—	March 13, 2008	Kitt Peak	Spacewatch	·	2.5 km	MPC · JPL
584176	2016 TF_{41}	—	September 29, 1995	Kitt Peak	Spacewatch	·	1.3 km	MPC · JPL
584177	2016 TH_{41}	—	September 8, 2000	Kitt Peak	Spacewatch	·	2.4 km	MPC · JPL
584178	2016 TH_{42}	—	April 9, 2015	Mount Lemmon	Mount Lemmon Survey	·	940 m	MPC · JPL
584179	2016 TG_{43}	—	May 13, 2009	Kitt Peak	Spacewatch	THM	2.3 km	MPC · JPL
584180	2016 TO_{43}	—	September 29, 2010	Mount Lemmon	Mount Lemmon Survey	·	2.8 km	MPC · JPL
584181	2016 TH_{44}	—	September 20, 2009	Kitt Peak	Spacewatch	·	380 m	MPC · JPL
584182	2016 TV_{44}	—	October 1, 2005	Mount Lemmon	Mount Lemmon Survey	·	2.9 km	MPC · JPL
584183	2016 TJ_{45}	—	November 23, 2011	XuYi	PMO NEO Survey Program	·	3.2 km	MPC · JPL
584184	2016 TQ_{51}	—	October 7, 2016	Haleakala	Pan-STARRS 1	·	2.1 km	MPC · JPL
584185	2016 TU_{51}	—	June 1, 2009	Mount Lemmon	Mount Lemmon Survey	·	2.4 km	MPC · JPL
584186	2016 TT_{52}	—	August 4, 2016	Haleakala	Pan-STARRS 1	·	2.7 km	MPC · JPL
584187	2016 TC_{53}	—	August 29, 2016	Mount Lemmon	Mount Lemmon Survey	·	2.4 km	MPC · JPL
584188	2016 TN_{56}	—	October 27, 2008	Siding Spring	SSS	H	710 m	MPC · JPL
584189	2016 TG_{58}	—	December 14, 2006	Kitt Peak	Spacewatch	EOS	2.3 km	MPC · JPL
584190	2016 TL_{58}	—	October 24, 2008	Kitt Peak	Spacewatch	MAR	910 m	MPC · JPL
584191	2016 TM_{58}	—	November 22, 2006	Mount Lemmon	Mount Lemmon Survey	(31811)	2.3 km	MPC · JPL
584192	2016 TT_{58}	—	September 6, 2010	Mount Lemmon	Mount Lemmon Survey	·	3.4 km	MPC · JPL
584193	2016 TP_{60}	—	September 14, 2005	Kitt Peak	Spacewatch	·	2.3 km	MPC · JPL
584194	2016 TH_{62}	—	August 27, 2011	Haleakala	Pan-STARRS 1	·	1.8 km	MPC · JPL
584195	2016 TL_{62}	—	February 28, 2014	Haleakala	Pan-STARRS 1	·	2.6 km	MPC · JPL
584196	2016 TJ_{65}	—	July 19, 2015	Haleakala	Pan-STARRS 1	·	2.6 km	MPC · JPL
584197	2016 TW_{65}	—	October 7, 2016	Haleakala	Pan-STARRS 1	·	3.4 km	MPC · JPL
584198	2016 TC_{67}	—	November 22, 2006	Mount Lemmon	Mount Lemmon Survey	·	3.4 km	MPC · JPL
584199	2016 TR_{67}	—	August 5, 2010	Sandlot	G. Hug	EOS	1.6 km	MPC · JPL
584200	2016 TX_{67}	—	June 13, 2010	Mount Lemmon	Mount Lemmon Survey	·	2.3 km	MPC · JPL

== 584201–584300 ==
back to top

Designation			Discovery			Properties		Ref
Permanent	Provisional	Named after	Date	Site	Discoverer(s)	Category	Diam.	Ref
584201	2016 TK_{68}	—	October 31, 2011	Mount Lemmon	Mount Lemmon Survey	EOS	1.4 km	MPC · JPL
584202	2016 TS_{68}	—	September 19, 2003	Kitt Peak	Spacewatch	·	580 m	MPC · JPL
584203	2016 TW_{69}	—	October 18, 2011	Haleakala	Pan-STARRS 1	·	1.6 km	MPC · JPL
584204	2016 TA_{71}	—	October 25, 2011	Haleakala	Pan-STARRS 1	·	3.0 km	MPC · JPL
584205	2016 TF_{73}	—	September 18, 2010	Mount Lemmon	Mount Lemmon Survey	·	2.9 km	MPC · JPL
584206	2016 TJ_{74}	—	August 20, 2004	Kitt Peak	Spacewatch	·	2.3 km	MPC · JPL
584207	2016 TP_{75}	—	August 13, 2010	Kitt Peak	Spacewatch	·	2.3 km	MPC · JPL
584208	2016 TS_{75}	—	October 20, 2003	Kitt Peak	Spacewatch	·	1.4 km	MPC · JPL
584209	2016 TH_{80}	—	April 3, 2008	Mount Lemmon	Mount Lemmon Survey	VER	2.4 km	MPC · JPL
584210	2016 TM_{80}	—	September 24, 2011	Haleakala	Pan-STARRS 1	EOS	1.7 km	MPC · JPL
584211	2016 TU_{81}	—	August 19, 2010	XuYi	PMO NEO Survey Program	·	3.2 km	MPC · JPL
584212	2016 TN_{84}	—	October 9, 2012	Haleakala	Pan-STARRS 1	·	1.5 km	MPC · JPL
584213	2016 TE_{89}	—	September 5, 2007	Anderson Mesa	LONEOS	·	1.8 km	MPC · JPL
584214	2016 TS_{90}	—	October 21, 2012	Haleakala	Pan-STARRS 1	·	760 m	MPC · JPL
584215	2016 TA_{93}	—	January 4, 2012	Mount Lemmon	Mount Lemmon Survey	H	480 m	MPC · JPL
584216	2016 TE_{95}	—	August 15, 2013	Haleakala	Pan-STARRS 1	H	360 m	MPC · JPL
584217	2016 TE_{96}	—	October 5, 2016	Mount Lemmon	Mount Lemmon Survey	EUN	1.0 km	MPC · JPL
584218	2016 TM_{96}	—	September 3, 2005	Palomar	NEAT	·	2.4 km	MPC · JPL
584219	2016 TZ_{96}	—	December 31, 2000	Haleakala	NEAT	·	3.6 km	MPC · JPL
584220	2016 TC_{97}	—	February 14, 2013	Haleakala	Pan-STARRS 1	·	2.7 km	MPC · JPL
584221	2016 TO_{97}	—	May 4, 2014	Mount Lemmon	Mount Lemmon Survey	EOS	1.8 km	MPC · JPL
584222	2016 TG_{98}	—	September 5, 2010	Ondřejov	Ondřejov, Observatoř	·	3.2 km	MPC · JPL
584223	2016 TJ_{100}	—	October 9, 2016	Haleakala	Pan-STARRS 1	·	2.8 km	MPC · JPL
584224	2016 TQ_{101}	—	October 13, 2016	Haleakala	Pan-STARRS 1	·	1.4 km	MPC · JPL
584225	2016 TL_{103}	—	October 13, 2016	Haleakala	Pan-STARRS 1	EUN	970 m	MPC · JPL
584226	2016 TO_{117}	—	October 7, 2016	Haleakala	Pan-STARRS 1	·	860 m	MPC · JPL
584227	2016 TX_{118}	—	October 12, 2016	Haleakala	Pan-STARRS 1	·	1.3 km	MPC · JPL
584228	2016 TQ_{122}	—	October 7, 2016	Kitt Peak	Spacewatch	·	2.6 km	MPC · JPL
584229	2016 TF_{124}	—	October 2, 2016	Mount Lemmon	Mount Lemmon Survey	·	2.4 km	MPC · JPL
584230	2016 TE_{132}	—	October 12, 2016	Haleakala	Pan-STARRS 1	·	2.4 km	MPC · JPL
584231	2016 TL_{132}	—	October 12, 2016	Haleakala	Pan-STARRS 1	·	1.6 km	MPC · JPL
584232	2016 TU_{138}	—	October 10, 2016	Haleakala	Pan-STARRS 1	·	1.3 km	MPC · JPL
584233	2016 UK	—	November 16, 2000	Anderson Mesa	LONEOS	·	2.1 km	MPC · JPL
584234	2016 UO	—	May 26, 2003	Kitt Peak	Spacewatch	·	3.1 km	MPC · JPL
584235	2016 UM_{1}	—	May 29, 2003	Cerro Tololo	Deep Ecliptic Survey	·	2.3 km	MPC · JPL
584236	2016 UP_{1}	—	October 25, 2011	Haleakala	Pan-STARRS 1	EOS	1.9 km	MPC · JPL
584237	2016 UO_{2}	—	November 26, 2011	Kitt Peak	Spacewatch	·	3.2 km	MPC · JPL
584238	2016 UJ_{3}	—	September 2, 2010	Mount Lemmon	Mount Lemmon Survey	·	3.2 km	MPC · JPL
584239	2016 UY_{4}	—	November 26, 2014	Haleakala	Pan-STARRS 1	H	650 m	MPC · JPL
584240	2016 UA_{5}	—	March 17, 2010	Kitt Peak	Spacewatch	H	430 m	MPC · JPL
584241	2016 UM_{9}	—	August 25, 2005	Palomar	NEAT	·	2.5 km	MPC · JPL
584242	2016 UK_{13}	—	August 2, 2016	Haleakala	Pan-STARRS 1	·	1.4 km	MPC · JPL
584243	2016 UC_{15}	—	November 15, 2011	Kitt Peak	Spacewatch	·	1.5 km	MPC · JPL
584244	2016 UN_{18}	—	March 8, 2013	Haleakala	Pan-STARRS 1	·	2.6 km	MPC · JPL
584245	2016 UK_{20}	—	October 10, 2005	Kitt Peak	Spacewatch	·	2.4 km	MPC · JPL
584246	2016 UR_{20}	—	August 15, 2004	Campo Imperatore	CINEOS	·	3.3 km	MPC · JPL
584247	2016 UD_{22}	—	August 13, 2010	Kitt Peak	Spacewatch	·	2.8 km	MPC · JPL
584248	2016 UW_{24}	—	September 30, 2005	Mount Lemmon	Mount Lemmon Survey	·	2.3 km	MPC · JPL
584249	2016 US_{25}	—	January 18, 2015	Haleakala	Pan-STARRS 1	H	610 m	MPC · JPL
584250	2016 UV_{26}	—	October 9, 1999	Socorro	LINEAR	·	2.7 km	MPC · JPL
584251	2016 UP_{28}	—	January 2, 2012	Mount Lemmon	Mount Lemmon Survey	·	2.9 km	MPC · JPL
584252	2016 UV_{28}	—	January 4, 2013	Cerro Tololo-DECam	DECam	·	2.7 km	MPC · JPL
584253	2016 UK_{35}	—	July 17, 2016	Haleakala	Pan-STARRS 1	·	1.2 km	MPC · JPL
584254	2016 UN_{38}	—	October 26, 2011	Haleakala	Pan-STARRS 1	·	2.4 km	MPC · JPL
584255	2016 UY_{39}	—	October 28, 2005	Catalina	CSS	·	3.0 km	MPC · JPL
584256	2016 UZ_{43}	—	November 3, 2011	Mount Lemmon	Mount Lemmon Survey	EOS	2.0 km	MPC · JPL
584257	2016 UB_{44}	—	January 5, 2013	Mount Lemmon	Mount Lemmon Survey	EOS	1.8 km	MPC · JPL
584258	2016 UO_{44}	—	October 3, 2011	Piszkéstető	K. Sárneczky	·	2.2 km	MPC · JPL
584259	2016 UP_{45}	—	April 4, 2003	Kitt Peak	Spacewatch	·	2.9 km	MPC · JPL
584260	2016 UC_{47}	—	January 20, 2013	Kitt Peak	Spacewatch	·	2.7 km	MPC · JPL
584261	2016 UL_{47}	—	September 26, 2005	Kitt Peak	Spacewatch	·	2.6 km	MPC · JPL
584262	2016 UM_{48}	—	October 24, 2005	Kitt Peak	Spacewatch	·	2.0 km	MPC · JPL
584263	2016 UA_{50}	—	March 6, 2008	Mount Lemmon	Mount Lemmon Survey	·	2.1 km	MPC · JPL
584264	2016 UZ_{50}	—	September 11, 2016	Mount Lemmon	Mount Lemmon Survey	·	2.4 km	MPC · JPL
584265	2016 UO_{52}	—	October 13, 2016	Haleakala	Pan-STARRS 1	·	3.1 km	MPC · JPL
584266	2016 US_{53}	—	September 20, 2006	Kitt Peak	Spacewatch	·	1.6 km	MPC · JPL
584267	2016 UT_{53}	—	March 8, 2014	Mount Lemmon	Mount Lemmon Survey	·	2.8 km	MPC · JPL
584268	2016 UE_{55}	—	August 30, 2005	Palomar	NEAT	·	3.5 km	MPC · JPL
584269	2016 UQ_{57}	—	September 1, 2005	Palomar	NEAT	·	2.5 km	MPC · JPL
584270	2016 UH_{58}	—	September 11, 2010	Kitt Peak	Spacewatch	·	2.3 km	MPC · JPL
584271	2016 UM_{58}	—	September 28, 2003	Kitt Peak	Spacewatch	H	410 m	MPC · JPL
584272	2016 UY_{60}	—	November 24, 2003	Kitt Peak	Spacewatch	·	1.6 km	MPC · JPL
584273	2016 UE_{62}	—	August 10, 2016	Haleakala	Pan-STARRS 1	MAR	890 m	MPC · JPL
584274	2016 UN_{62}	—	August 10, 2010	Kitt Peak	Spacewatch	·	2.9 km	MPC · JPL
584275	2016 UA_{64}	—	April 5, 2014	Haleakala	Pan-STARRS 1	·	2.7 km	MPC · JPL
584276	2016 UZ_{64}	—	November 24, 2008	Kitt Peak	Spacewatch	KON	1.8 km	MPC · JPL
584277	2016 UK_{65}	—	October 26, 2016	Mount Lemmon	Mount Lemmon Survey	·	2.7 km	MPC · JPL
584278	2016 UY_{67}	—	October 19, 2011	Kitt Peak	Spacewatch	·	2.0 km	MPC · JPL
584279	2016 UD_{69}	—	November 13, 2007	Kitt Peak	Spacewatch	·	1.9 km	MPC · JPL
584280	2016 UA_{72}	—	November 4, 2005	Mount Lemmon	Mount Lemmon Survey	·	2.4 km	MPC · JPL
584281	2016 UL_{75}	—	October 29, 2005	Mount Lemmon	Mount Lemmon Survey	·	2.5 km	MPC · JPL
584282	2016 UX_{75}	—	September 18, 2010	Mount Lemmon	Mount Lemmon Survey	·	2.7 km	MPC · JPL
584283	2016 UQ_{76}	—	December 22, 2008	Kitt Peak	Spacewatch	·	1.7 km	MPC · JPL
584284	2016 UY_{76}	—	October 11, 2010	Kitt Peak	Spacewatch	·	2.9 km	MPC · JPL
584285	2016 UQ_{79}	—	October 16, 2001	Cima Ekar	ADAS	·	1 km	MPC · JPL
584286	2016 UH_{81}	—	November 6, 2005	Kitt Peak	Spacewatch	·	2.7 km	MPC · JPL
584287	2016 UP_{81}	—	October 29, 2005	Mount Lemmon	Mount Lemmon Survey	·	1.9 km	MPC · JPL
584288	2016 UR_{94}	—	April 6, 2008	Kitt Peak	Spacewatch	·	2.5 km	MPC · JPL
584289	2016 UD_{95}	—	October 24, 2011	Mount Lemmon	Mount Lemmon Survey	EOS	1.5 km	MPC · JPL
584290	2016 UH_{98}	—	March 5, 2008	Mount Lemmon	Mount Lemmon Survey	·	1.6 km	MPC · JPL
584291	2016 UC_{101}	—	October 13, 2016	Mount Lemmon	Mount Lemmon Survey	H	410 m	MPC · JPL
584292	2016 UJ_{103}	—	May 1, 2014	Mount Lemmon	Mount Lemmon Survey	·	1.6 km	MPC · JPL
584293	2016 UG_{109}	—	April 4, 2014	Mount Lemmon	Mount Lemmon Survey	·	1.8 km	MPC · JPL
584294	2016 UQ_{109}	—	October 30, 2016	Mount Lemmon	Mount Lemmon Survey	H	600 m	MPC · JPL
584295	2016 UG_{110}	—	October 20, 2003	Kitt Peak	Spacewatch	HNS	1.2 km	MPC · JPL
584296	2016 UQ_{111}	—	April 5, 2014	Haleakala	Pan-STARRS 1	·	2.3 km	MPC · JPL
584297	2016 UE_{113}	—	February 19, 2001	Kitt Peak	Spacewatch	·	2.8 km	MPC · JPL
584298	2016 UN_{120}	—	October 21, 2016	Mount Lemmon	Mount Lemmon Survey	·	2.6 km	MPC · JPL
584299	2016 UM_{121}	—	October 23, 2011	Mount Lemmon	Mount Lemmon Survey	H	350 m	MPC · JPL
584300	2016 UW_{123}	—	June 26, 2015	Haleakala	Pan-STARRS 1	·	900 m	MPC · JPL

== 584301–584400 ==
back to top

Designation			Discovery			Properties		Ref
Permanent	Provisional	Named after	Date	Site	Discoverer(s)	Category	Diam.	Ref
584301	2016 UF_{126}	—	November 6, 2005	Mount Lemmon	Mount Lemmon Survey	THM	1.9 km	MPC · JPL
584302	2016 UU_{139}	—	May 3, 2008	Mount Lemmon	Mount Lemmon Survey	·	3.8 km	MPC · JPL
584303	2016 UK_{141}	—	May 21, 2015	Haleakala	Pan-STARRS 1	·	980 m	MPC · JPL
584304	2016 UN_{142}	—	October 2, 2016	Mount Lemmon	Mount Lemmon Survey	·	3.0 km	MPC · JPL
584305	2016 UQ_{144}	—	September 2, 2016	Mount Lemmon	Mount Lemmon Survey	·	2.3 km	MPC · JPL
584306	2016 UV_{144}	—	September 12, 2005	Kitt Peak	Spacewatch	·	2.4 km	MPC · JPL
584307	2016 US_{149}	—	November 27, 2006	Mount Lemmon	Mount Lemmon Survey	·	2.9 km	MPC · JPL
584308	2016 UJ_{155}	—	October 20, 2016	Mount Lemmon	Mount Lemmon Survey	·	1.7 km	MPC · JPL
584309	2016 UT_{251}	—	October 21, 2016	Mount Lemmon	Mount Lemmon Survey	·	1.4 km	MPC · JPL
584310	2016 UD_{257}	—	October 21, 2016	Mount Lemmon	Mount Lemmon Survey	·	2.5 km	MPC · JPL
584311 Pozhlakov	2016 VD_{1}	Pozhlakov	November 20, 2011	Zelenchukskaya Stn	T. V. Krjačko, Satovski, B.	H	540 m	MPC · JPL
584312	2016 VT_{9}	—	October 24, 2005	Kitt Peak	Spacewatch	TIR	1.9 km	MPC · JPL
584313	2016 VJ_{10}	—	April 27, 2006	Cerro Tololo	Deep Ecliptic Survey	·	1.2 km	MPC · JPL
584314	2016 VC_{16}	—	October 4, 2004	Socorro	LINEAR	EUP	4.6 km	MPC · JPL
584315	2016 VE_{16}	—	June 8, 2016	Haleakala	Pan-STARRS 1	·	2.1 km	MPC · JPL
584316	2016 VV_{33}	—	November 5, 2016	Haleakala	Pan-STARRS 1	·	1.2 km	MPC · JPL
584317	2016 VR_{37}	—	November 10, 2016	Mount Lemmon	Mount Lemmon Survey	·	1.2 km	MPC · JPL
584318	2016 WA_{1}	—	December 3, 2008	Mount Lemmon	Mount Lemmon Survey	H	550 m	MPC · JPL
584319	2016 WG_{2}	—	May 13, 2015	Haleakala	Pan-STARRS 1	H	500 m	MPC · JPL
584320	2016 WE_{3}	—	February 6, 2002	Kitt Peak	Spacewatch	H	440 m	MPC · JPL
584321	2016 WO_{3}	—	April 15, 2007	Mount Lemmon	Mount Lemmon Survey	H	550 m	MPC · JPL
584322	2016 WV_{12}	—	December 12, 2004	Kitt Peak	Spacewatch	EUN	1.0 km	MPC · JPL
584323	2016 WK_{13}	—	October 31, 2010	Mount Lemmon	Mount Lemmon Survey	·	2.7 km	MPC · JPL
584324	2016 WA_{15}	—	October 26, 2005	Kitt Peak	Spacewatch	·	2.5 km	MPC · JPL
584325	2016 WZ_{15}	—	October 9, 2010	Mount Lemmon	Mount Lemmon Survey	·	2.7 km	MPC · JPL
584326	2016 WZ_{16}	—	October 26, 2016	Haleakala	Pan-STARRS 1	·	3.0 km	MPC · JPL
584327	2016 WV_{18}	—	October 28, 2005	Mount Lemmon	Mount Lemmon Survey	·	2.0 km	MPC · JPL
584328	2016 WV_{20}	—	January 20, 2006	Anderson Mesa	LONEOS	·	2.5 km	MPC · JPL
584329	2016 WM_{30}	—	January 28, 2007	Mount Lemmon	Mount Lemmon Survey	·	3.1 km	MPC · JPL
584330	2016 WH_{34}	—	September 17, 2010	Kitt Peak	Spacewatch	VER	2.6 km	MPC · JPL
584331	2016 WJ_{34}	—	September 20, 2011	Mount Lemmon	Mount Lemmon Survey	·	1.6 km	MPC · JPL
584332	2016 WV_{34}	—	November 7, 2008	Mount Lemmon	Mount Lemmon Survey	·	1.2 km	MPC · JPL
584333	2016 WS_{39}	—	September 26, 2011	Haleakala	Pan-STARRS 1	·	1.4 km	MPC · JPL
584334	2016 WB_{40}	—	January 4, 2006	Kitt Peak	Spacewatch	·	2.6 km	MPC · JPL
584335	2016 WS_{51}	—	October 28, 2011	Ka-Dar	Gerke, V.	·	1.9 km	MPC · JPL
584336	2016 WW_{54}	—	March 15, 2013	Catalina	CSS	·	2.3 km	MPC · JPL
584337	2016 WJ_{55}	—	June 4, 2005	Kitt Peak	Spacewatch	H	550 m	MPC · JPL
584338	2016 WY_{55}	—	September 17, 2010	Kitt Peak	Spacewatch	·	2.6 km	MPC · JPL
584339	2016 WB_{56}	—	April 14, 2010	Mount Lemmon	Mount Lemmon Survey	·	1.6 km	MPC · JPL
584340	2016 XA_{1}	—	June 29, 2015	Haleakala	Pan-STARRS 1	·	2.4 km	MPC · JPL
584341	2016 XX_{1}	—	December 5, 2016	Mount Lemmon	Mount Lemmon Survey	H	460 m	MPC · JPL
584342	2016 XX_{5}	—	October 11, 1999	Kitt Peak	Spacewatch	·	2.6 km	MPC · JPL
584343	2016 XJ_{15}	—	November 14, 2002	Palomar	NEAT	H	580 m	MPC · JPL
584344	2016 XX_{21}	—	July 30, 2001	Palomar	NEAT	PHO	1.5 km	MPC · JPL
584345	2016 XC_{22}	—	May 18, 2007	Bergisch Gladbach	W. Bickel	·	5.8 km	MPC · JPL
584346	2016 XF_{26}	—	December 9, 2016	Mount Lemmon	Mount Lemmon Survey	H	510 m	MPC · JPL
584347	2016 YH_{1}	—	September 15, 2013	La Sagra	OAM	H	580 m	MPC · JPL
584348	2016 YY_{5}	—	December 7, 2015	Haleakala	Pan-STARRS 1	·	2.9 km	MPC · JPL
584349	2016 YA_{6}	—	December 15, 2006	Kitt Peak	Spacewatch	·	2.1 km	MPC · JPL
584350	2016 YL_{9}	—	November 5, 2016	Mount Lemmon	Mount Lemmon Survey	EUP	3.5 km	MPC · JPL
584351	2016 YH_{13}	—	December 24, 2016	Space Surveillance	Space Surveillance Telescope	H	570 m	MPC · JPL
584352	2016 YL_{17}	—	December 23, 2016	Haleakala	Pan-STARRS 1	L5	8.7 km	MPC · JPL
584353	2016 YD_{26}	—	December 22, 2016	Haleakala	Pan-STARRS 1	·	1.6 km	MPC · JPL
584354	2017 AL_{5}	—	February 7, 2013	Nogales	M. Schwartz, P. R. Holvorcem	·	2.0 km	MPC · JPL
584355	2017 AH_{7}	—	February 23, 2012	Mount Lemmon	Mount Lemmon Survey	·	2.0 km	MPC · JPL
584356	2017 AJ_{7}	—	October 3, 2013	Mount Lemmon	Mount Lemmon Survey	L5	9.4 km	MPC · JPL
584357	2017 AC_{10}	—	June 26, 2015	Haleakala	Pan-STARRS 1	H	470 m	MPC · JPL
584358	2017 AO_{10}	—	August 13, 2015	Space Surveillance	Space Surveillance Telescope	H	490 m	MPC · JPL
584359	2017 AA_{17}	—	June 27, 2015	Haleakala	Pan-STARRS 1	·	1.1 km	MPC · JPL
584360	2017 AS_{17}	—	October 10, 2010	Mount Lemmon	Mount Lemmon Survey	·	1.7 km	MPC · JPL
584361	2017 AE_{19}	—	February 3, 2009	Kitt Peak	Spacewatch	H	470 m	MPC · JPL
584362	2017 AS_{19}	—	December 18, 2003	Socorro	LINEAR	H	470 m	MPC · JPL
584363	2017 AO_{32}	—	July 28, 2011	Haleakala	Pan-STARRS 1	L5	7.2 km	MPC · JPL
584364	2017 AG_{33}	—	October 15, 2012	Mount Lemmon	Mount Lemmon Survey	L5	7.6 km	MPC · JPL
584365	2017 BD	—	February 10, 2007	Mount Lemmon	Mount Lemmon Survey	·	710 m	MPC · JPL
584366	2017 BK_{2}	—	December 1, 2006	Mount Lemmon	Mount Lemmon Survey	·	890 m	MPC · JPL
584367	2017 BA_{3}	—	October 30, 2007	Mount Lemmon	Mount Lemmon Survey	H	490 m	MPC · JPL
584368	2017 BG_{4}	—	November 18, 2010	Kitt Peak	Spacewatch	·	2.3 km	MPC · JPL
584369	2017 BJ_{6}	—	January 23, 2006	Kitt Peak	Spacewatch	H	480 m	MPC · JPL
584370	2017 BP_{7}	—	October 28, 2016	Haleakala	Pan-STARRS 1	H	520 m	MPC · JPL
584371	2017 BX_{11}	—	February 5, 2006	Kitt Peak	Spacewatch	EUP	3.3 km	MPC · JPL
584372	2017 BX_{18}	—	November 29, 2005	Mount Lemmon	Mount Lemmon Survey	EUP	2.9 km	MPC · JPL
584373	2017 BQ_{22}	—	September 28, 2003	Kitt Peak	Spacewatch	·	1.3 km	MPC · JPL
584374	2017 BD_{27}	—	October 9, 2008	Kitt Peak	Spacewatch	(2076)	1.0 km	MPC · JPL
584375	2017 BQ_{27}	—	November 21, 2009	Mount Lemmon	Mount Lemmon Survey	·	970 m	MPC · JPL
584376	2017 BC_{31}	—	January 22, 2006	Mount Lemmon	Mount Lemmon Survey	H	440 m	MPC · JPL
584377	2017 BQ_{36}	—	January 13, 2011	Mount Lemmon	Mount Lemmon Survey	·	3.2 km	MPC · JPL
584378	2017 BZ_{41}	—	January 9, 2006	Kitt Peak	Spacewatch	·	3.1 km	MPC · JPL
584379	2017 BR_{44}	—	March 29, 2014	Mount Lemmon	Mount Lemmon Survey	·	540 m	MPC · JPL
584380	2017 BB_{60}	—	January 3, 2017	Haleakala	Pan-STARRS 1	·	670 m	MPC · JPL
584381	2017 BN_{61}	—	December 23, 2016	Haleakala	Pan-STARRS 1	·	1.2 km	MPC · JPL
584382	2017 BU_{71}	—	December 13, 2015	Haleakala	Pan-STARRS 1	·	3.4 km	MPC · JPL
584383	2017 BH_{77}	—	January 27, 2017	Haleakala	Pan-STARRS 1	·	2.7 km	MPC · JPL
584384	2017 BK_{79}	—	January 27, 2017	Haleakala	Pan-STARRS 1	NYS	910 m	MPC · JPL
584385	2017 BH_{80}	—	November 20, 2014	Haleakala	Pan-STARRS 1	L5	7.5 km	MPC · JPL
584386	2017 BN_{83}	—	November 20, 2009	Mount Lemmon	Mount Lemmon Survey	·	1.0 km	MPC · JPL
584387	2017 BU_{86}	—	December 16, 2006	Kitt Peak	Spacewatch	·	760 m	MPC · JPL
584388	2017 BX_{94}	—	March 27, 2003	Socorro	LINEAR	·	890 m	MPC · JPL
584389	2017 BO_{123}	—	March 9, 2007	Kitt Peak	Spacewatch	L5	7.7 km	MPC · JPL
584390	2017 BG_{130}	—	September 25, 2012	Kitt Peak	Spacewatch	·	630 m	MPC · JPL
584391	2017 BQ_{139}	—	April 23, 2014	Cerro Tololo	DECam	·	490 m	MPC · JPL
584392	2017 BZ_{139}	—	July 29, 2008	Mount Lemmon	Mount Lemmon Survey	·	860 m	MPC · JPL
584393	2017 BH_{140}	—	September 18, 2015	Mount Lemmon	Mount Lemmon Survey	·	540 m	MPC · JPL
584394	2017 BZ_{158}	—	January 29, 2017	Haleakala	Pan-STARRS 1	L5	7.9 km	MPC · JPL
584395	2017 BM_{160}	—	January 27, 2017	Haleakala	Pan-STARRS 1	L5	6.7 km	MPC · JPL
584396	2017 BE_{166}	—	January 28, 2017	Haleakala	Pan-STARRS 1	·	1.4 km	MPC · JPL
584397	2017 BF_{180}	—	January 28, 2017	Haleakala	Pan-STARRS 1	·	1.0 km	MPC · JPL
584398	2017 CW	—	March 13, 2007	Mount Lemmon	Mount Lemmon Survey	H	360 m	MPC · JPL
584399	2017 CO_{3}	—	March 11, 2003	Palomar	NEAT	·	650 m	MPC · JPL
584400	2017 CQ_{12}	—	March 16, 2007	Kitt Peak	Spacewatch	·	570 m	MPC · JPL

== 584401–584500 ==
back to top

Designation			Discovery			Properties		Ref
Permanent	Provisional	Named after	Date	Site	Discoverer(s)	Category	Diam.	Ref
584401	2017 CS_{12}	—	November 7, 2015	Mount Lemmon	Mount Lemmon Survey	·	650 m	MPC · JPL
584402	2017 CS_{16}	—	February 1, 2008	Mount Lemmon	Mount Lemmon Survey	·	2.0 km	MPC · JPL
584403	2017 CC_{31}	—	October 9, 2012	Mount Lemmon	Mount Lemmon Survey	·	720 m	MPC · JPL
584404	2017 CE_{31}	—	July 19, 2015	Haleakala	Pan-STARRS 1	·	3.4 km	MPC · JPL
584405	2017 CP_{38}	—	February 3, 2017	Haleakala	Pan-STARRS 1	·	3.1 km	MPC · JPL
584406	2017 DH_{3}	—	August 24, 2008	Kitt Peak	Spacewatch	V	630 m	MPC · JPL
584407	2017 DX_{3}	—	January 23, 2006	Kitt Peak	Spacewatch	·	2.5 km	MPC · JPL
584408	2017 DK_{6}	—	December 11, 2006	Kitt Peak	Spacewatch	·	740 m	MPC · JPL
584409	2017 DL_{6}	—	March 14, 2004	Palomar	NEAT	·	860 m	MPC · JPL
584410	2017 DM_{12}	—	April 30, 2011	Mount Lemmon	Mount Lemmon Survey	·	640 m	MPC · JPL
584411	2017 DU_{14}	—	October 9, 2012	Mount Lemmon	Mount Lemmon Survey	·	530 m	MPC · JPL
584412	2017 DB_{21}	—	February 3, 2000	Kitt Peak	Spacewatch	VER	2.1 km	MPC · JPL
584413	2017 DY_{21}	—	August 25, 2012	Mount Lemmon	Mount Lemmon Survey	·	510 m	MPC · JPL
584414	2017 DK_{23}	—	July 28, 2011	Haleakala	Pan-STARRS 1	L5	7.0 km	MPC · JPL
584415	2017 DJ_{35}	—	January 9, 2014	Nogales	M. Schwartz, P. R. Holvorcem	·	1.0 km	MPC · JPL
584416	2017 DM_{39}	—	February 21, 2007	Kitt Peak	Spacewatch	·	470 m	MPC · JPL
584417	2017 DN_{41}	—	September 6, 2008	Mount Lemmon	Mount Lemmon Survey	·	710 m	MPC · JPL
584418	2017 DR_{47}	—	March 28, 2014	Mount Lemmon	Mount Lemmon Survey	·	510 m	MPC · JPL
584419	2017 DV_{50}	—	April 30, 2011	Mount Lemmon	Mount Lemmon Survey	·	620 m	MPC · JPL
584420	2017 DF_{52}	—	September 26, 2011	Haleakala	Pan-STARRS 1	·	940 m	MPC · JPL
584421	2017 DA_{58}	—	September 14, 2012	Kitt Peak	Spacewatch	·	840 m	MPC · JPL
584422	2017 DD_{69}	—	February 27, 2006	Mount Lemmon	Mount Lemmon Survey	THM	2.1 km	MPC · JPL
584423	2017 DS_{69}	—	September 20, 2003	Kitt Peak	Spacewatch	·	2.7 km	MPC · JPL
584424	2017 DG_{73}	—	October 1, 2005	Kitt Peak	Spacewatch	·	640 m	MPC · JPL
584425	2017 DO_{73}	—	October 8, 2012	Kitt Peak	Spacewatch	·	760 m	MPC · JPL
584426	2017 DL_{76}	—	February 10, 2011	Mount Lemmon	Mount Lemmon Survey	VER	2.2 km	MPC · JPL
584427	2017 DM_{76}	—	August 24, 2011	Haleakala	Pan-STARRS 1	·	640 m	MPC · JPL
584428	2017 DU_{76}	—	August 23, 2004	Kitt Peak	Spacewatch	·	890 m	MPC · JPL
584429	2017 DD_{77}	—	September 9, 2015	Haleakala	Pan-STARRS 1	·	580 m	MPC · JPL
584430	2017 DY_{82}	—	January 12, 2008	Kitt Peak	Spacewatch	·	1.6 km	MPC · JPL
584431	2017 DB_{83}	—	November 10, 2009	Mount Lemmon	Mount Lemmon Survey	·	640 m	MPC · JPL
584432	2017 DL_{83}	—	March 26, 2003	Palomar	NEAT	fast?	940 m	MPC · JPL
584433	2017 DK_{84}	—	February 27, 2012	Front Royal	Skillman, D.	·	2.4 km	MPC · JPL
584434	2017 DS_{84}	—	March 11, 2007	Kitt Peak	Spacewatch	·	940 m	MPC · JPL
584435	2017 DB_{85}	—	December 13, 2006	Mount Lemmon	Mount Lemmon Survey	·	650 m	MPC · JPL
584436	2017 DC_{88}	—	October 29, 2005	Mount Lemmon	Mount Lemmon Survey	·	630 m	MPC · JPL
584437	2017 DB_{94}	—	August 22, 2014	Haleakala	Pan-STARRS 1	·	1.7 km	MPC · JPL
584438	2017 DO_{95}	—	July 23, 2015	Haleakala	Pan-STARRS 1	·	600 m	MPC · JPL
584439	2017 DB_{99}	—	October 22, 2008	Kitt Peak	Spacewatch	·	980 m	MPC · JPL
584440	2017 DR_{104}	—	November 19, 2009	Kitt Peak	Spacewatch	·	630 m	MPC · JPL
584441	2017 DC_{111}	—	February 21, 2003	Palomar	NEAT	·	710 m	MPC · JPL
584442	2017 DD_{111}	—	March 23, 2004	Socorro	LINEAR	·	740 m	MPC · JPL
584443	2017 DK_{114}	—	February 16, 2010	Kitt Peak	Spacewatch	·	640 m	MPC · JPL
584444	2017 DR_{115}	—	November 6, 2012	Mount Lemmon	Mount Lemmon Survey	·	710 m	MPC · JPL
584445	2017 DG_{119}	—	August 16, 2009	Kitt Peak	Spacewatch	EOS	1.7 km	MPC · JPL
584446	2017 DT_{120}	—	November 13, 2006	Mount Lemmon	Mount Lemmon Survey	·	1.8 km	MPC · JPL
584447	2017 DU_{121}	—	February 15, 2013	Haleakala	Pan-STARRS 1	·	1.4 km	MPC · JPL
584448	2017 DY_{122}	—	April 24, 2007	Kitt Peak	Spacewatch	·	580 m	MPC · JPL
584449	2017 EQ_{5}	—	January 30, 2017	Mount Lemmon	Mount Lemmon Survey	PHO	920 m	MPC · JPL
584450	2017 EY_{6}	—	January 22, 2006	Mount Lemmon	Mount Lemmon Survey	·	2.0 km	MPC · JPL
584451	2017 EQ_{8}	—	January 30, 2006	Kitt Peak	Spacewatch	NYS	880 m	MPC · JPL
584452	2017 EO_{11}	—	April 19, 2007	Mount Lemmon	Mount Lemmon Survey	·	720 m	MPC · JPL
584453	2017 EL_{13}	—	August 25, 2003	Palomar	NEAT	·	1.3 km	MPC · JPL
584454	2017 EM_{14}	—	October 21, 2012	Haleakala	Pan-STARRS 1	·	710 m	MPC · JPL
584455	2017 EC_{17}	—	January 23, 2006	Kitt Peak	Spacewatch	·	1.0 km	MPC · JPL
584456	2017 EO_{17}	—	January 3, 2013	Haleakala	Pan-STARRS 1	·	890 m	MPC · JPL
584457	2017 EO_{27}	—	December 25, 2005	Mount Lemmon	Mount Lemmon Survey	·	730 m	MPC · JPL
584458	2017 EF_{31}	—	March 7, 2017	Haleakala	Pan-STARRS 1	·	630 m	MPC · JPL
584459	2017 EL_{31}	—	March 5, 2017	Haleakala	Pan-STARRS 1	·	570 m	MPC · JPL
584460	2017 EQ_{31}	—	March 7, 2017	Haleakala	Pan-STARRS 1	·	630 m	MPC · JPL
584461	2017 FJ_{5}	—	September 19, 2012	Mount Lemmon	Mount Lemmon Survey	·	870 m	MPC · JPL
584462	2017 FV_{5}	—	September 5, 2008	Kitt Peak	Spacewatch	·	830 m	MPC · JPL
584463	2017 FF_{6}	—	November 12, 2005	Kitt Peak	Spacewatch	·	830 m	MPC · JPL
584464	2017 FY_{7}	—	April 5, 2014	Haleakala	Pan-STARRS 1	·	540 m	MPC · JPL
584465	2017 FY_{10}	—	February 2, 2005	Kitt Peak	Spacewatch	L5	10 km	MPC · JPL
584466	2017 FR_{11}	—	May 21, 2014	Haleakala	Pan-STARRS 1	·	730 m	MPC · JPL
584467	2017 FM_{13}	—	March 31, 2014	Kitt Peak	Spacewatch	·	710 m	MPC · JPL
584468	2017 FE_{14}	—	April 1, 2014	Kitt Peak	Spacewatch	·	620 m	MPC · JPL
584469	2017 FG_{17}	—	October 20, 2012	Kitt Peak	Spacewatch	·	480 m	MPC · JPL
584470	2017 FV_{19}	—	April 15, 2007	Kitt Peak	Spacewatch	·	1.8 km	MPC · JPL
584471	2017 FS_{25}	—	March 21, 2004	Kitt Peak	Spacewatch	·	470 m	MPC · JPL
584472	2017 FY_{25}	—	April 9, 2010	Kitt Peak	Spacewatch	·	1.1 km	MPC · JPL
584473	2017 FL_{30}	—	October 27, 2005	Kitt Peak	Spacewatch	·	620 m	MPC · JPL
584474	2017 FM_{30}	—	March 14, 2007	Kitt Peak	Spacewatch	·	550 m	MPC · JPL
584475	2017 FN_{30}	—	March 11, 2007	Kitt Peak	Spacewatch	·	580 m	MPC · JPL
584476	2017 FU_{30}	—	June 15, 2001	Palomar	NEAT	·	790 m	MPC · JPL
584477	2017 FQ_{32}	—	March 12, 2010	Mount Lemmon	Mount Lemmon Survey	·	720 m	MPC · JPL
584478	2017 FY_{32}	—	April 18, 2007	Mount Lemmon	Mount Lemmon Survey	·	510 m	MPC · JPL
584479	2017 FB_{33}	—	January 26, 2007	Kitt Peak	Spacewatch	·	460 m	MPC · JPL
584480	2017 FY_{34}	—	April 30, 2014	Haleakala	Pan-STARRS 1	·	670 m	MPC · JPL
584481	2017 FG_{35}	—	August 24, 2007	Kitt Peak	Spacewatch	·	980 m	MPC · JPL
584482	2017 FP_{35}	—	January 27, 2006	Mount Lemmon	Mount Lemmon Survey	MAS	640 m	MPC · JPL
584483	2017 FK_{36}	—	January 27, 2007	Mount Lemmon	Mount Lemmon Survey	·	620 m	MPC · JPL
584484	2017 FT_{36}	—	October 23, 2005	Catalina	CSS	·	740 m	MPC · JPL
584485	2017 FW_{39}	—	April 11, 2007	Kitt Peak	Spacewatch	·	700 m	MPC · JPL
584486	2017 FH_{40}	—	March 18, 2010	Mount Lemmon	Mount Lemmon Survey	·	660 m	MPC · JPL
584487	2017 FJ_{40}	—	July 30, 2005	Palomar	NEAT	·	770 m	MPC · JPL
584488	2017 FQ_{40}	—	January 9, 2006	Mount Lemmon	Mount Lemmon Survey	·	790 m	MPC · JPL
584489	2017 FS_{40}	—	April 11, 2003	Kitt Peak	Spacewatch	V	690 m	MPC · JPL
584490	2017 FT_{40}	—	February 15, 2010	Kitt Peak	Spacewatch	·	730 m	MPC · JPL
584491	2017 FK_{42}	—	October 9, 2015	Haleakala	Pan-STARRS 1	·	740 m	MPC · JPL
584492	2017 FR_{42}	—	October 1, 2005	Mount Lemmon	Mount Lemmon Survey	·	600 m	MPC · JPL
584493	2017 FR_{52}	—	December 24, 2005	Kitt Peak	Spacewatch	·	790 m	MPC · JPL
584494	2017 FE_{53}	—	April 24, 2003	Kitt Peak	Spacewatch	·	790 m	MPC · JPL
584495	2017 FN_{53}	—	January 6, 2006	Mount Lemmon	Mount Lemmon Survey	H	550 m	MPC · JPL
584496	2017 FW_{60}	—	June 21, 2014	Haleakala	Pan-STARRS 1	·	600 m	MPC · JPL
584497	2017 FR_{71}	—	November 4, 2005	Mount Lemmon	Mount Lemmon Survey	·	730 m	MPC · JPL
584498	2017 FA_{74}	—	September 29, 2008	Kitt Peak	Spacewatch	·	630 m	MPC · JPL
584499	2017 FZ_{75}	—	February 3, 2013	Haleakala	Pan-STARRS 1	V	650 m	MPC · JPL
584500	2017 FZ_{76}	—	August 23, 2014	Haleakala	Pan-STARRS 1	·	1.7 km	MPC · JPL

== 584501–584600 ==
back to top

Designation			Discovery			Properties		Ref
Permanent	Provisional	Named after	Date	Site	Discoverer(s)	Category	Diam.	Ref
584501	2017 FC_{77}	—	March 25, 2003	Palomar	NEAT	·	750 m	MPC · JPL
584502	2017 FN_{81}	—	March 23, 2003	Kitt Peak	Spacewatch	V	620 m	MPC · JPL
584503	2017 FQ_{81}	—	July 22, 2011	Haleakala	Pan-STARRS 1	·	750 m	MPC · JPL
584504	2017 FR_{81}	—	October 28, 2005	Catalina	CSS	·	670 m	MPC · JPL
584505	2017 FE_{84}	—	January 18, 2004	Kitt Peak	Spacewatch	L5	10 km	MPC · JPL
584506	2017 FL_{84}	—	January 2, 2017	Haleakala	Pan-STARRS 1	·	560 m	MPC · JPL
584507	2017 FZ_{87}	—	January 8, 2010	Mount Lemmon	Mount Lemmon Survey	·	700 m	MPC · JPL
584508	2017 FB_{88}	—	February 15, 2010	Kitt Peak	Spacewatch	·	580 m	MPC · JPL
584509	2017 FS_{94}	—	May 8, 2014	Haleakala	Pan-STARRS 1	·	530 m	MPC · JPL
584510	2017 FM_{97}	—	January 27, 2007	Kitt Peak	Spacewatch	·	520 m	MPC · JPL
584511	2017 FD_{99}	—	July 25, 2011	Haleakala	Pan-STARRS 1	·	640 m	MPC · JPL
584512	2017 FM_{109}	—	August 20, 2004	Kitt Peak	Spacewatch	·	660 m	MPC · JPL
584513	2017 FT_{110}	—	May 6, 2014	Mount Lemmon	Mount Lemmon Survey	·	420 m	MPC · JPL
584514	2017 FY_{111}	—	September 10, 2009	Catalina	CSS	·	2.4 km	MPC · JPL
584515	2017 FR_{112}	—	February 21, 2017	Haleakala	Pan-STARRS 1	·	610 m	MPC · JPL
584516	2017 FO_{113}	—	November 3, 2008	Kitt Peak	Spacewatch	·	1.0 km	MPC · JPL
584517	2017 FB_{118}	—	September 12, 2015	Haleakala	Pan-STARRS 1	CLA	1.5 km	MPC · JPL
584518	2017 FG_{122}	—	November 3, 2015	Mount Lemmon	Mount Lemmon Survey	·	640 m	MPC · JPL
584519	2017 FK_{123}	—	April 1, 2003	Kitt Peak	Deep Ecliptic Survey	·	690 m	MPC · JPL
584520	2017 FF_{134}	—	January 9, 2007	Mount Lemmon	Mount Lemmon Survey	·	430 m	MPC · JPL
584521	2017 FL_{140}	—	October 18, 2015	Haleakala	Pan-STARRS 1	·	510 m	MPC · JPL
584522	2017 FP_{151}	—	April 10, 2003	Kitt Peak	Spacewatch	·	680 m	MPC · JPL
584523	2017 FO_{153}	—	April 4, 2014	Haleakala	Pan-STARRS 1	·	660 m	MPC · JPL
584524	2017 FL_{155}	—	September 23, 2015	Haleakala	Pan-STARRS 1	·	680 m	MPC · JPL
584525	2017 FZ_{155}	—	November 19, 2008	Mount Lemmon	Mount Lemmon Survey	·	1.1 km	MPC · JPL
584526	2017 FR_{156}	—	July 25, 2015	Haleakala	Pan-STARRS 1	·	540 m	MPC · JPL
584527	2017 FG_{163}	—	March 18, 2017	Mount Lemmon	Mount Lemmon Survey	(2076)	620 m	MPC · JPL
584528	2017 GH_{3}	—	September 26, 2011	Haleakala	Pan-STARRS 1	·	590 m	MPC · JPL
584529	2017 GT_{9}	—	March 6, 2013	Haleakala	Pan-STARRS 1	·	1.1 km	MPC · JPL
584530	2017 GY_{10}	—	July 17, 2007	Dauban	C. Rinner, Kugel, F.	T_{j} (2.73)	4.3 km	MPC · JPL
584531	2017 HU_{1}	—	May 15, 2012	Haleakala	Pan-STARRS 1	H	530 m	MPC · JPL
584532	2017 HB_{2}	—	March 23, 2001	Haleakala	NEAT	EUP	3.8 km	MPC · JPL
584533	2017 HL_{3}	—	April 27, 2012	Haleakala	Pan-STARRS 1	H	380 m	MPC · JPL
584534	2017 HQ_{9}	—	November 28, 2006	Mount Lemmon	Mount Lemmon Survey	·	540 m	MPC · JPL
584535	2017 HX_{10}	—	February 25, 2012	Mount Lemmon	Mount Lemmon Survey	H	370 m	MPC · JPL
584536	2017 HC_{14}	—	January 22, 2013	Mount Lemmon	Mount Lemmon Survey	·	850 m	MPC · JPL
584537	2017 HF_{14}	—	January 7, 2006	Kitt Peak	Spacewatch	·	730 m	MPC · JPL
584538	2017 HT_{15}	—	November 21, 2015	Mount Lemmon	Mount Lemmon Survey	V	460 m	MPC · JPL
584539	2017 HC_{16}	—	October 5, 2003	Kitt Peak	Spacewatch	·	1.1 km	MPC · JPL
584540	2017 HQ_{16}	—	October 8, 2007	Mount Lemmon	Mount Lemmon Survey	·	920 m	MPC · JPL
584541	2017 HX_{16}	—	September 22, 2008	Kitt Peak	Spacewatch	·	2.7 km	MPC · JPL
584542	2017 HN_{17}	—	March 25, 2010	Kitt Peak	Spacewatch	·	630 m	MPC · JPL
584543	2017 HO_{19}	—	March 18, 2010	Mount Lemmon	Mount Lemmon Survey	·	520 m	MPC · JPL
584544	2017 HX_{19}	—	September 17, 1995	Kitt Peak	Spacewatch	·	660 m	MPC · JPL
584545	2017 HR_{20}	—	February 17, 2013	Mount Lemmon	Mount Lemmon Survey	·	910 m	MPC · JPL
584546	2017 HF_{24}	—	March 19, 2013	Haleakala	Pan-STARRS 1	·	1.0 km	MPC · JPL
584547	2017 HV_{24}	—	October 29, 2005	Mount Lemmon	Mount Lemmon Survey	·	730 m	MPC · JPL
584548	2017 HS_{30}	—	February 1, 2016	Haleakala	Pan-STARRS 1	·	1.6 km	MPC · JPL
584549	2017 HC_{32}	—	May 2, 2003	Kitt Peak	Spacewatch	V	750 m	MPC · JPL
584550	2017 HD_{32}	—	August 24, 2007	Kitt Peak	Spacewatch	V	490 m	MPC · JPL
584551	2017 HJ_{35}	—	November 29, 2003	Kitt Peak	Spacewatch	·	1.2 km	MPC · JPL
584552	2017 HK_{35}	—	July 31, 2014	Haleakala	Pan-STARRS 1	·	950 m	MPC · JPL
584553	2017 HX_{36}	—	February 21, 2003	Palomar	NEAT	·	620 m	MPC · JPL
584554	2017 HG_{40}	—	May 6, 2006	Kitt Peak	Spacewatch	·	900 m	MPC · JPL
584555	2017 HK_{47}	—	January 16, 2013	Mount Lemmon	Mount Lemmon Survey	·	460 m	MPC · JPL
584556	2017 HK_{48}	—	July 25, 2014	Haleakala	Pan-STARRS 1	·	1.2 km	MPC · JPL
584557	2017 HC_{50}	—	October 15, 2001	Palomar	NEAT	·	780 m	MPC · JPL
584558	2017 HE_{62}	—	October 10, 2015	Haleakala	Pan-STARRS 1	·	570 m	MPC · JPL
584559	2017 HC_{68}	—	April 26, 2017	Haleakala	Pan-STARRS 1	·	860 m	MPC · JPL
584560	2017 HS_{68}	—	April 26, 2017	Haleakala	Pan-STARRS 1	V	630 m	MPC · JPL
584561	2017 HD_{69}	—	September 1, 2014	Mount Lemmon	Mount Lemmon Survey	·	790 m	MPC · JPL
584562	2017 HN_{78}	—	April 26, 2017	Haleakala	Pan-STARRS 1	·	800 m	MPC · JPL
584563	2017 JK_{4}	—	September 20, 2011	Kitt Peak	Spacewatch	V	740 m	MPC · JPL
584564	2017 KB	—	October 6, 2008	Kitt Peak	Spacewatch	·	710 m	MPC · JPL
584565	2017 KP	—	May 26, 2000	Kitt Peak	Spacewatch	·	560 m	MPC · JPL
584566	2017 KO_{2}	—	September 5, 2015	Haleakala	Pan-STARRS 1	H	410 m	MPC · JPL
584567	2017 KA_{6}	—	February 13, 2009	Mount Lemmon	Mount Lemmon Survey	·	1.2 km	MPC · JPL
584568	2017 KM_{7}	—	March 8, 2013	Haleakala	Pan-STARRS 1	·	1.2 km	MPC · JPL
584569	2017 KO_{9}	—	March 16, 2007	Kitt Peak	Spacewatch	·	620 m	MPC · JPL
584570	2017 KY_{13}	—	February 16, 2013	Mount Lemmon	Mount Lemmon Survey	·	890 m	MPC · JPL
584571	2017 KY_{14}	—	November 9, 2007	Mount Lemmon	Mount Lemmon Survey	·	1.6 km	MPC · JPL
584572	2017 KA_{15}	—	January 5, 2013	Kitt Peak	Spacewatch	·	780 m	MPC · JPL
584573	2017 KC_{17}	—	January 5, 2013	Kitt Peak	Spacewatch	·	570 m	MPC · JPL
584574	2017 KD_{21}	—	October 2, 2008	Kitt Peak	Spacewatch	·	730 m	MPC · JPL
584575	2017 KP_{21}	—	February 14, 2010	Mount Lemmon	Mount Lemmon Survey	·	690 m	MPC · JPL
584576	2017 KR_{21}	—	January 18, 2009	Mount Lemmon	Mount Lemmon Survey	·	1.2 km	MPC · JPL
584577	2017 KQ_{24}	—	November 16, 2014	Mount Lemmon	Mount Lemmon Survey	·	850 m	MPC · JPL
584578	2017 KR_{24}	—	January 30, 2006	Kitt Peak	Spacewatch	·	630 m	MPC · JPL
584579	2017 KY_{24}	—	March 4, 2011	Kitt Peak	Spacewatch	·	2.5 km	MPC · JPL
584580	2017 KP_{29}	—	May 11, 2010	Mount Lemmon	Mount Lemmon Survey	·	830 m	MPC · JPL
584581	2017 KE_{30}	—	November 18, 2008	Kitt Peak	Spacewatch	·	870 m	MPC · JPL
584582	2017 KY_{30}	—	October 24, 2015	Haleakala	Pan-STARRS 1	H	510 m	MPC · JPL
584583	2017 KB_{31}	—	November 18, 2015	Haleakala	Pan-STARRS 1	H	520 m	MPC · JPL
584584	2017 KX_{32}	—	April 4, 2017	Haleakala	Pan-STARRS 1	PHO	840 m	MPC · JPL
584585	2017 KG_{33}	—	December 30, 2008	Kitt Peak	Spacewatch	·	1.3 km	MPC · JPL
584586	2017 KF_{35}	—	June 20, 2013	Mount Lemmon	Mount Lemmon Survey	·	1.4 km	MPC · JPL
584587	2017 KS_{36}	—	December 1, 2008	Kitt Peak	Spacewatch	·	820 m	MPC · JPL
584588	2017 LM	—	June 10, 2013	Mount Lemmon	Mount Lemmon Survey	·	1.5 km	MPC · JPL
584589	2017 MB_{16}	—	June 25, 2017	Haleakala	Pan-STARRS 1	HNS	880 m	MPC · JPL
584590	2017 ML_{17}	—	June 25, 2017	Haleakala	Pan-STARRS 1	EOS	1.3 km	MPC · JPL
584591	2017 NM	—	September 7, 2004	Socorro	LINEAR	·	1.6 km	MPC · JPL
584592	2017 OC_{3}	—	February 21, 2003	Palomar	NEAT	·	1.4 km	MPC · JPL
584593	2017 OH_{3}	—	February 10, 2016	Haleakala	Pan-STARRS 1	NYS	1.1 km	MPC · JPL
584594	2017 OW_{3}	—	January 18, 1999	Kitt Peak	Spacewatch	EOS	2.1 km	MPC · JPL
584595	2017 OA_{4}	—	July 13, 2013	Mount Lemmon	Mount Lemmon Survey	·	1.3 km	MPC · JPL
584596	2017 OG_{4}	—	July 30, 2009	Kitt Peak	Spacewatch	·	940 m	MPC · JPL
584597	2017 OY_{4}	—	February 8, 2007	Palomar	NEAT	ADE	1.8 km	MPC · JPL
584598	2017 OF_{5}	—	February 14, 2010	Mount Lemmon	Mount Lemmon Survey	·	1.6 km	MPC · JPL
584599	2017 OL_{9}	—	January 18, 2015	Haleakala	Pan-STARRS 1	·	2.1 km	MPC · JPL
584600	2017 OB_{10}	—	June 20, 2013	Haleakala	Pan-STARRS 1	·	890 m	MPC · JPL

== 584601–584700 ==
back to top

Designation			Discovery			Properties		Ref
Permanent	Provisional	Named after	Date	Site	Discoverer(s)	Category	Diam.	Ref
584601	2017 OM_{10}	—	September 15, 2010	Kitt Peak	Spacewatch	3:2	4.4 km	MPC · JPL
584602	2017 OL_{11}	—	March 11, 2003	Palomar	NEAT	·	1.4 km	MPC · JPL
584603	2017 OJ_{18}	—	April 5, 2016	Haleakala	Pan-STARRS 1	·	1.4 km	MPC · JPL
584604	2017 OD_{20}	—	July 27, 2017	Haleakala	Pan-STARRS 1	AMO	100 m	MPC · JPL
584605	2017 OW_{21}	—	July 14, 2013	Haleakala	Pan-STARRS 1	·	890 m	MPC · JPL
584606	2017 OC_{22}	—	December 26, 2014	Haleakala	Pan-STARRS 1	AGN	960 m	MPC · JPL
584607	2017 OK_{23}	—	January 16, 2015	Haleakala	Pan-STARRS 1	·	1.5 km	MPC · JPL
584608	2017 OM_{25}	—	April 24, 2004	Kitt Peak	Spacewatch	·	1.2 km	MPC · JPL
584609	2017 OD_{30}	—	May 15, 2012	Haleakala	Pan-STARRS 1	·	1.3 km	MPC · JPL
584610	2017 OW_{30}	—	April 11, 2016	Haleakala	Pan-STARRS 1	·	1.4 km	MPC · JPL
584611	2017 OG_{31}	—	January 22, 2015	Haleakala	Pan-STARRS 1	·	1.8 km	MPC · JPL
584612	2017 OX_{31}	—	November 1, 2013	Kitt Peak	Spacewatch	·	1.7 km	MPC · JPL
584613	2017 OY_{31}	—	January 26, 2015	Haleakala	Pan-STARRS 1	EUN	1.1 km	MPC · JPL
584614	2017 OA_{36}	—	October 11, 2001	Kitt Peak	Spacewatch	·	950 m	MPC · JPL
584615	2017 OM_{36}	—	April 15, 2004	Siding Spring	SSS	·	1.1 km	MPC · JPL
584616	2017 ON_{36}	—	August 26, 2013	Haleakala	Pan-STARRS 1	·	1.5 km	MPC · JPL
584617	2017 OH_{37}	—	February 10, 2011	Mount Lemmon	Mount Lemmon Survey	·	890 m	MPC · JPL
584618	2017 OK_{38}	—	September 11, 2004	Kitt Peak	Spacewatch	·	1.6 km	MPC · JPL
584619	2017 OB_{40}	—	April 4, 2016	Haleakala	Pan-STARRS 1	·	1.1 km	MPC · JPL
584620	2017 OE_{40}	—	September 15, 2013	Haleakala	Pan-STARRS 1	RAF	610 m	MPC · JPL
584621	2017 OZ_{41}	—	September 9, 2004	Kitt Peak	Spacewatch	·	1.3 km	MPC · JPL
584622	2017 OP_{44}	—	January 18, 2015	Mount Lemmon	Mount Lemmon Survey	·	1.2 km	MPC · JPL
584623	2017 OZ_{44}	—	April 18, 2015	Cerro Tololo	DECam	VER	2.7 km	MPC · JPL
584624	2017 OV_{45}	—	February 20, 2015	Haleakala	Pan-STARRS 1	EOS	1.8 km	MPC · JPL
584625	2017 OB_{46}	—	February 8, 2015	Mount Lemmon	Mount Lemmon Survey	·	1.9 km	MPC · JPL
584626	2017 OO_{46}	—	April 26, 2008	Kitt Peak	Spacewatch	·	1.3 km	MPC · JPL
584627	2017 OZ_{46}	—	October 27, 2005	Mount Lemmon	Mount Lemmon Survey	(5)	750 m	MPC · JPL
584628	2017 OE_{47}	—	December 29, 2014	Haleakala	Pan-STARRS 1	·	1.2 km	MPC · JPL
584629	2017 OO_{47}	—	September 14, 2010	Mount Lemmon	Mount Lemmon Survey	·	850 m	MPC · JPL
584630	2017 OK_{48}	—	January 27, 2011	Mount Lemmon	Mount Lemmon Survey	·	1.7 km	MPC · JPL
584631	2017 OB_{49}	—	June 25, 2017	Haleakala	Pan-STARRS 1	·	1.3 km	MPC · JPL
584632	2017 OP_{50}	—	December 6, 2013	Haleakala	Pan-STARRS 1	·	1.9 km	MPC · JPL
584633	2017 OW_{50}	—	February 13, 2007	Mount Lemmon	Mount Lemmon Survey	·	1.3 km	MPC · JPL
584634	2017 OL_{52}	—	July 14, 2013	Haleakala	Pan-STARRS 1	·	1.2 km	MPC · JPL
584635	2017 OE_{53}	—	December 21, 2014	Haleakala	Pan-STARRS 1	KOR	990 m	MPC · JPL
584636	2017 OL_{54}	—	February 24, 2012	Mount Lemmon	Mount Lemmon Survey	·	880 m	MPC · JPL
584637	2017 OR_{57}	—	October 9, 2012	Haleakala	Pan-STARRS 1	·	2.2 km	MPC · JPL
584638	2017 OT_{57}	—	July 30, 2017	Haleakala	Pan-STARRS 1	·	2.3 km	MPC · JPL
584639	2017 OG_{58}	—	February 21, 2007	Mount Lemmon	Mount Lemmon Survey	MAR	1.0 km	MPC · JPL
584640	2017 OW_{60}	—	December 31, 2013	Mount Lemmon	Mount Lemmon Survey	·	2.4 km	MPC · JPL
584641	2017 OL_{63}	—	September 10, 2013	Haleakala	Pan-STARRS 1	·	1.5 km	MPC · JPL
584642	2017 OY_{63}	—	January 17, 2015	Haleakala	Pan-STARRS 1	HNS	660 m	MPC · JPL
584643	2017 OM_{64}	—	July 17, 2004	Cerro Tololo	Deep Ecliptic Survey	EUN	1.2 km	MPC · JPL
584644	2017 OO_{64}	—	September 22, 2008	Mount Lemmon	Mount Lemmon Survey	·	1.8 km	MPC · JPL
584645	2017 OP_{66}	—	September 28, 2013	Catalina	CSS	·	1.6 km	MPC · JPL
584646	2017 OH_{80}	—	March 1, 2011	Mount Lemmon	Mount Lemmon Survey	·	1.6 km	MPC · JPL
584647	2017 OE_{88}	—	April 30, 2016	Haleakala	Pan-STARRS 1	·	1.5 km	MPC · JPL
584648	2017 OG_{100}	—	July 26, 2017	Haleakala	Pan-STARRS 1	·	2.8 km	MPC · JPL
584649	2017 OC_{108}	—	July 25, 2017	Haleakala	Pan-STARRS 1	·	1.5 km	MPC · JPL
584650	2017 PX	—	March 1, 2011	Mount Lemmon	Mount Lemmon Survey	·	1.2 km	MPC · JPL
584651	2017 PU_{4}	—	February 16, 2015	Haleakala	Pan-STARRS 1	·	1.6 km	MPC · JPL
584652	2017 PZ_{5}	—	August 9, 2013	Kitt Peak	Spacewatch	·	830 m	MPC · JPL
584653	2017 PB_{6}	—	July 13, 2013	Haleakala	Pan-STARRS 1	·	800 m	MPC · JPL
584654	2017 PN_{7}	—	August 27, 2005	Palomar	NEAT	·	950 m	MPC · JPL
584655	2017 PR_{8}	—	August 10, 2007	Kitt Peak	Spacewatch	·	1.6 km	MPC · JPL
584656	2017 PQ_{9}	—	January 11, 2011	Kitt Peak	Spacewatch	JUN	820 m	MPC · JPL
584657	2017 PW_{9}	—	October 3, 2013	Haleakala	Pan-STARRS 1	·	1.3 km	MPC · JPL
584658	2017 PJ_{12}	—	August 1, 2017	Haleakala	Pan-STARRS 1	·	620 m	MPC · JPL
584659	2017 PQ_{13}	—	February 21, 2007	Mount Lemmon	Mount Lemmon Survey	·	1.0 km	MPC · JPL
584660	2017 PM_{15}	—	March 6, 2011	Mount Lemmon	Mount Lemmon Survey	(11882)	1.3 km	MPC · JPL
584661	2017 PO_{15}	—	September 11, 2004	Kitt Peak	Spacewatch	(17392)	1.7 km	MPC · JPL
584662	2017 PN_{18}	—	December 11, 2013	Haleakala	Pan-STARRS 1	GEF	1.1 km	MPC · JPL
584663	2017 PV_{19}	—	November 25, 2013	Nogales	M. Schwartz, P. R. Holvorcem	·	1.4 km	MPC · JPL
584664	2017 PY_{19}	—	March 26, 2003	Palomar	NEAT	·	1.3 km	MPC · JPL
584665	2017 PQ_{21}	—	November 24, 2009	Kitt Peak	Spacewatch	(29841)	1.5 km	MPC · JPL
584666	2017 PN_{29}	—	October 26, 2013	Mount Lemmon	Mount Lemmon Survey	·	1.5 km	MPC · JPL
584667	2017 PD_{31}	—	November 27, 2013	Haleakala	Pan-STARRS 1	·	1.3 km	MPC · JPL
584668	2017 PR_{31}	—	October 2, 2010	Mount Lemmon	Mount Lemmon Survey	·	1.0 km	MPC · JPL
584669	2017 PB_{32}	—	March 2, 2008	Kitt Peak	Spacewatch	·	830 m	MPC · JPL
584670	2017 PC_{32}	—	February 5, 2011	Haleakala	Pan-STARRS 1	·	1.6 km	MPC · JPL
584671	2017 PN_{33}	—	September 5, 2008	Socorro	LINEAR	·	2.1 km	MPC · JPL
584672	2017 PV_{33}	—	January 13, 2008	Kitt Peak	Spacewatch	·	1.2 km	MPC · JPL
584673	2017 PG_{34}	—	October 21, 2008	Kitt Peak	Spacewatch	·	1.4 km	MPC · JPL
584674	2017 PR_{38}	—	March 4, 2011	Mount Lemmon	Mount Lemmon Survey	·	1.3 km	MPC · JPL
584675	2017 PT_{38}	—	July 1, 2013	Haleakala	Pan-STARRS 1	MAS	780 m	MPC · JPL
584676	2017 PZ_{38}	—	August 23, 2004	Kitt Peak	Spacewatch	EUN	1.1 km	MPC · JPL
584677	2017 PY_{39}	—	November 15, 2006	Kitt Peak	Spacewatch	·	950 m	MPC · JPL
584678	2017 PB_{40}	—	October 3, 2013	Haleakala	Pan-STARRS 1	·	1.4 km	MPC · JPL
584679	2017 PB_{52}	—	August 12, 2017	Haleakala	Pan-STARRS 1	·	2.7 km	MPC · JPL
584680	2017 PP_{53}	—	August 3, 2017	Haleakala	Pan-STARRS 1	·	1.3 km	MPC · JPL
584681	2017 PQ_{53}	—	August 4, 2017	Haleakala	Pan-STARRS 1	EUN	900 m	MPC · JPL
584682	2017 PJ_{55}	—	August 1, 2017	Haleakala	Pan-STARRS 1	·	2.2 km	MPC · JPL
584683	2017 QF_{1}	—	September 12, 2005	Kitt Peak	Spacewatch	·	650 m	MPC · JPL
584684	2017 QW_{3}	—	September 20, 2003	Kitt Peak	Spacewatch	·	1.9 km	MPC · JPL
584685	2017 QW_{4}	—	March 8, 2005	Mount Lemmon	Mount Lemmon Survey	MAS	640 m	MPC · JPL
584686	2017 QV_{5}	—	August 9, 2013	Kitt Peak	Spacewatch	·	790 m	MPC · JPL
584687	2017 QD_{7}	—	October 26, 2008	Mount Lemmon	Mount Lemmon Survey	·	1.9 km	MPC · JPL
584688	2017 QD_{9}	—	June 5, 2016	Haleakala	Pan-STARRS 1	EOS	1.5 km	MPC · JPL
584689	2017 QW_{10}	—	April 15, 2007	Kitt Peak	Spacewatch	·	1.1 km	MPC · JPL
584690	2017 QX_{11}	—	October 18, 1998	Kitt Peak	Spacewatch	·	1.0 km	MPC · JPL
584691	2017 QP_{12}	—	April 10, 2013	Haleakala	Pan-STARRS 1	·	510 m	MPC · JPL
584692	2017 QF_{14}	—	March 6, 2011	Kitt Peak	Spacewatch	·	1.6 km	MPC · JPL
584693	2017 QF_{17}	—	July 27, 2017	Haleakala	Pan-STARRS 1	AMO	400 m	MPC · JPL
584694	2017 QH_{19}	—	May 5, 2008	Mount Lemmon	Mount Lemmon Survey	·	1.6 km	MPC · JPL
584695	2017 QY_{20}	—	August 8, 2013	Haleakala	Pan-STARRS 1	·	900 m	MPC · JPL
584696	2017 QM_{21}	—	February 14, 2012	Haleakala	Pan-STARRS 1	·	980 m	MPC · JPL
584697	2017 QB_{22}	—	September 7, 2008	Mount Lemmon	Mount Lemmon Survey	AST	1.4 km	MPC · JPL
584698	2017 QC_{23}	—	May 29, 2012	Mount Lemmon	Mount Lemmon Survey	·	1.4 km	MPC · JPL
584699	2017 QO_{24}	—	March 22, 2012	Mount Lemmon	Mount Lemmon Survey	EUN	830 m	MPC · JPL
584700	2017 QQ_{24}	—	March 14, 2016	Mount Lemmon	Mount Lemmon Survey	·	1.7 km	MPC · JPL

== 584701–584800 ==
back to top

Designation			Discovery			Properties		Ref
Permanent	Provisional	Named after	Date	Site	Discoverer(s)	Category	Diam.	Ref
584701	2017 QU_{24}	—	February 9, 2010	Kitt Peak	Spacewatch	·	1.7 km	MPC · JPL
584702	2017 QY_{25}	—	August 23, 2003	Palomar	NEAT	(2076)	1.1 km	MPC · JPL
584703	2017 QO_{28}	—	February 10, 2011	Mount Lemmon	Mount Lemmon Survey	·	1.2 km	MPC · JPL
584704	2017 QA_{31}	—	February 11, 2011	Mount Lemmon	Mount Lemmon Survey	EUN	980 m	MPC · JPL
584705	2017 QD_{31}	—	November 9, 2013	Oukaïmeden	C. Rinner	·	1.6 km	MPC · JPL
584706	2017 QG_{31}	—	December 21, 2008	Mount Lemmon	Mount Lemmon Survey	EOS	2.1 km	MPC · JPL
584707	2017 QJ_{31}	—	April 3, 2008	Mount Lemmon	Mount Lemmon Survey	·	1.5 km	MPC · JPL
584708	2017 QJ_{32}	—	May 22, 2003	Kitt Peak	Spacewatch	EUN	1.1 km	MPC · JPL
584709	2017 QG_{36}	—	August 1, 2009	Bergisch Gladbach	W. Bickel	·	1.4 km	MPC · JPL
584710	2017 QL_{36}	—	November 9, 1999	Kitt Peak	Spacewatch	NYS	840 m	MPC · JPL
584711	2017 QR_{36}	—	June 21, 2009	Mount Lemmon	Mount Lemmon Survey	·	900 m	MPC · JPL
584712	2017 QX_{36}	—	December 10, 2009	Mount Lemmon	Mount Lemmon Survey	·	1.8 km	MPC · JPL
584713	2017 QZ_{37}	—	July 1, 2017	Haleakala	Pan-STARRS 1	·	1.7 km	MPC · JPL
584714	2017 QN_{38}	—	February 10, 2016	Haleakala	Pan-STARRS 1	AGN	1.0 km	MPC · JPL
584715	2017 QX_{39}	—	August 6, 2012	Haleakala	Pan-STARRS 1	EOS	1.6 km	MPC · JPL
584716	2017 QT_{40}	—	August 27, 2006	Kitt Peak	Spacewatch	·	1 km	MPC · JPL
584717	2017 QV_{41}	—	October 1, 2008	Mount Lemmon	Mount Lemmon Survey	·	2.0 km	MPC · JPL
584718	2017 QK_{42}	—	March 14, 2007	Mount Lemmon	Mount Lemmon Survey	·	1.7 km	MPC · JPL
584719	2017 QQ_{42}	—	January 19, 2012	Haleakala	Pan-STARRS 1	·	810 m	MPC · JPL
584720	2017 QX_{42}	—	January 26, 2006	Mount Lemmon	Mount Lemmon Survey	·	1.5 km	MPC · JPL
584721	2017 QF_{43}	—	April 1, 2008	Kitt Peak	Spacewatch	·	930 m	MPC · JPL
584722	2017 QJ_{44}	—	December 4, 2013	Haleakala	Pan-STARRS 1	·	2.7 km	MPC · JPL
584723	2017 QY_{44}	—	January 4, 2011	Mount Lemmon	Mount Lemmon Survey	JUN	800 m	MPC · JPL
584724	2017 QK_{45}	—	November 28, 2013	Mount Lemmon	Mount Lemmon Survey	·	1.9 km	MPC · JPL
584725	2017 QS_{45}	—	January 11, 2011	Mount Lemmon	Mount Lemmon Survey	·	1.6 km	MPC · JPL
584726	2017 QH_{48}	—	February 10, 1999	Kitt Peak	Spacewatch	·	1.2 km	MPC · JPL
584727	2017 QU_{48}	—	January 20, 2015	Haleakala	Pan-STARRS 1	·	1.5 km	MPC · JPL
584728	2017 QZ_{48}	—	January 10, 2007	Mount Lemmon	Mount Lemmon Survey	·	820 m	MPC · JPL
584729	2017 QO_{49}	—	August 14, 2013	Haleakala	Pan-STARRS 1	·	970 m	MPC · JPL
584730	2017 QM_{50}	—	April 12, 2004	Kitt Peak	Spacewatch	·	1.0 km	MPC · JPL
584731	2017 QT_{50}	—	November 13, 2010	Mount Lemmon	Mount Lemmon Survey	·	1 km	MPC · JPL
584732	2017 QX_{50}	—	September 28, 2003	Kitt Peak	Spacewatch	·	2.0 km	MPC · JPL
584733	2017 QH_{51}	—	September 21, 2008	Kitt Peak	Spacewatch	·	2.4 km	MPC · JPL
584734	2017 QQ_{51}	—	September 11, 2007	Kitt Peak	Spacewatch	·	570 m	MPC · JPL
584735	2017 QT_{51}	—	March 13, 2012	Mount Lemmon	Mount Lemmon Survey	MAS	780 m	MPC · JPL
584736	2017 QB_{52}	—	September 15, 2013	Catalina	CSS	·	1.2 km	MPC · JPL
584737	2017 QJ_{52}	—	August 26, 2012	Haleakala	Pan-STARRS 1	EOS	1.9 km	MPC · JPL
584738	2017 QU_{53}	—	October 24, 2013	Mount Lemmon	Mount Lemmon Survey	·	1.4 km	MPC · JPL
584739	2017 QB_{54}	—	March 11, 2015	Mount Lemmon	Mount Lemmon Survey	·	1.6 km	MPC · JPL
584740	2017 QW_{54}	—	October 10, 1999	Kitt Peak	Spacewatch	NYS	810 m	MPC · JPL
584741	2017 QG_{55}	—	March 31, 2013	Kitt Peak	Spacewatch	·	690 m	MPC · JPL
584742	2017 QL_{55}	—	September 13, 2005	Kitt Peak	Spacewatch	·	870 m	MPC · JPL
584743	2017 QX_{56}	—	September 20, 2007	Kitt Peak	Spacewatch	·	2.8 km	MPC · JPL
584744	2017 QV_{58}	—	February 26, 2007	Mount Lemmon	Mount Lemmon Survey	·	1.7 km	MPC · JPL
584745	2017 QW_{58}	—	January 31, 2006	Kitt Peak	Spacewatch	·	1.7 km	MPC · JPL
584746	2017 QO_{59}	—	March 16, 2007	Mount Lemmon	Mount Lemmon Survey	(5)	1.3 km	MPC · JPL
584747	2017 QV_{59}	—	January 22, 2015	Haleakala	Pan-STARRS 1	HOF	2.4 km	MPC · JPL
584748	2017 QZ_{59}	—	December 25, 2005	Kitt Peak	Spacewatch	·	1.6 km	MPC · JPL
584749	2017 QK_{60}	—	September 21, 2009	Mount Lemmon	Mount Lemmon Survey	·	960 m	MPC · JPL
584750	2017 QA_{61}	—	August 22, 2003	Palomar	NEAT	·	610 m	MPC · JPL
584751	2017 QF_{61}	—	September 8, 2010	Kitt Peak	Spacewatch	·	870 m	MPC · JPL
584752	2017 QJ_{61}	—	March 2, 2011	Mount Lemmon	Mount Lemmon Survey	·	1.5 km	MPC · JPL
584753	2017 QL_{61}	—	March 1, 2012	Mount Lemmon	Mount Lemmon Survey	·	1.2 km	MPC · JPL
584754	2017 QU_{61}	—	August 31, 2014	Haleakala	Pan-STARRS 1	·	530 m	MPC · JPL
584755	2017 QL_{62}	—	July 27, 1995	Kitt Peak	Spacewatch	·	1.4 km	MPC · JPL
584756	2017 QZ_{62}	—	April 1, 2011	Mount Lemmon	Mount Lemmon Survey	·	1.7 km	MPC · JPL
584757	2017 QD_{63}	—	August 24, 2012	Kitt Peak	Spacewatch	·	1.9 km	MPC · JPL
584758	2017 QG_{63}	—	September 1, 2013	Mount Lemmon	Mount Lemmon Survey	·	1.1 km	MPC · JPL
584759	2017 QT_{64}	—	September 18, 2003	Kitt Peak	Spacewatch	·	1.8 km	MPC · JPL
584760	2017 QM_{65}	—	December 7, 2013	Nogales	M. Schwartz, P. R. Holvorcem	·	2.2 km	MPC · JPL
584761	2017 QF_{66}	—	September 2, 2005	Palomar	NEAT	·	1.2 km	MPC · JPL
584762	2017 QR_{66}	—	May 16, 2012	Haleakala	Pan-STARRS 1	·	1.9 km	MPC · JPL
584763	2017 QT_{66}	—	May 16, 2005	Palomar	NEAT	NYS	1.5 km	MPC · JPL
584764	2017 QV_{81}	—	June 18, 2005	Mount Lemmon	Mount Lemmon Survey	·	2.8 km	MPC · JPL
584765	2017 QJ_{92}	—	August 24, 2017	Haleakala	Pan-STARRS 1	·	1.2 km	MPC · JPL
584766	2017 QK_{92}	—	August 31, 2017	Mount Lemmon	Mount Lemmon Survey	·	1.3 km	MPC · JPL
584767	2017 QT_{97}	—	August 23, 2017	Haleakala	Pan-STARRS 1	EOS	1.7 km	MPC · JPL
584768	2017 QH_{109}	—	August 23, 2017	Haleakala	Pan-STARRS 1	·	2.2 km	MPC · JPL
584769	2017 RQ_{1}	—	March 9, 2011	Kitt Peak	Spacewatch	H	390 m	MPC · JPL
584770	2017 RZ_{2}	—	October 26, 2008	Catalina	CSS	·	2.2 km	MPC · JPL
584771	2017 RM_{3}	—	March 13, 2010	Mount Lemmon	Mount Lemmon Survey	·	1.2 km	MPC · JPL
584772	2017 RT_{4}	—	September 15, 2009	Kitt Peak	Spacewatch	EUN	890 m	MPC · JPL
584773	2017 RL_{5}	—	October 15, 2012	Haleakala	Pan-STARRS 1	EOS	1.4 km	MPC · JPL
584774	2017 RD_{6}	—	October 7, 2008	Mount Lemmon	Mount Lemmon Survey	HOF	2.1 km	MPC · JPL
584775	2017 RS_{7}	—	September 16, 2004	Kitt Peak	Spacewatch	·	1.2 km	MPC · JPL
584776	2017 RB_{11}	—	August 24, 2017	Haleakala	Pan-STARRS 1	EUP	2.7 km	MPC · JPL
584777	2017 RY_{12}	—	October 27, 2005	Kitt Peak	Spacewatch	(5)	1.0 km	MPC · JPL
584778	2017 RG_{16}	—	August 6, 2017	Haleakala	Pan-STARRS 1	T_{j} (0.91) · centaur	30 km	MPC · JPL
584779	2017 RG_{18}	—	December 21, 2008	Mount Lemmon	Mount Lemmon Survey	·	1.6 km	MPC · JPL
584780	2017 RQ_{19}	—	September 16, 2012	Mount Lemmon	Mount Lemmon Survey	·	1.9 km	MPC · JPL
584781	2017 RE_{20}	—	September 20, 2009	Mount Lemmon	Mount Lemmon Survey	·	1.4 km	MPC · JPL
584782	2017 RF_{20}	—	February 9, 2003	Palomar	NEAT	·	3.7 km	MPC · JPL
584783	2017 RJ_{20}	—	April 8, 2002	Kitt Peak	Spacewatch	JUN	1.1 km	MPC · JPL
584784	2017 RV_{20}	—	October 16, 2013	Mount Lemmon	Mount Lemmon Survey	·	1.3 km	MPC · JPL
584785	2017 RZ_{20}	—	February 27, 2012	Haleakala	Pan-STARRS 1	·	1.3 km	MPC · JPL
584786	2017 RK_{21}	—	April 11, 2005	Mount Lemmon	Mount Lemmon Survey	·	2.0 km	MPC · JPL
584787	2017 RM_{21}	—	November 27, 2013	Mount Lemmon	Mount Lemmon Survey	GEF	1.2 km	MPC · JPL
584788	2017 RZ_{21}	—	September 17, 2009	Kitt Peak	Spacewatch	·	1.2 km	MPC · JPL
584789	2017 RG_{22}	—	July 13, 2013	Mount Lemmon	Mount Lemmon Survey	V	570 m	MPC · JPL
584790	2017 RB_{23}	—	October 14, 2007	Mount Lemmon	Mount Lemmon Survey	·	690 m	MPC · JPL
584791	2017 RQ_{23}	—	January 14, 2011	Mount Lemmon	Mount Lemmon Survey	·	1.3 km	MPC · JPL
584792	2017 RZ_{23}	—	March 10, 2007	Mount Lemmon	Mount Lemmon Survey	·	1.4 km	MPC · JPL
584793	2017 RS_{25}	—	January 18, 2012	Mount Lemmon	Mount Lemmon Survey	·	960 m	MPC · JPL
584794	2017 RV_{26}	—	October 26, 2009	Bisei	BATTeRS	·	1.0 km	MPC · JPL
584795	2017 RD_{29}	—	August 7, 2008	Kitt Peak	Spacewatch	·	1.7 km	MPC · JPL
584796	2017 RH_{30}	—	October 24, 2009	Kitt Peak	Spacewatch	·	1.1 km	MPC · JPL
584797	2017 RQ_{30}	—	May 1, 2013	Mount Lemmon	Mount Lemmon Survey	·	670 m	MPC · JPL
584798	2017 RJ_{31}	—	November 17, 2009	Mount Lemmon	Mount Lemmon Survey	·	1.5 km	MPC · JPL
584799	2017 RO_{31}	—	September 28, 2000	Kitt Peak	Spacewatch	·	1.2 km	MPC · JPL
584800	2017 RY_{31}	—	February 15, 2015	Haleakala	Pan-STARRS 1	·	1.4 km	MPC · JPL

== 584801–584900 ==
back to top

Designation			Discovery			Properties		Ref
Permanent	Provisional	Named after	Date	Site	Discoverer(s)	Category	Diam.	Ref
584801	2017 RJ_{33}	—	October 10, 2012	Mount Lemmon	Mount Lemmon Survey	·	2.8 km	MPC · JPL
584802	2017 RL_{34}	—	May 6, 2011	Kitt Peak	Spacewatch	·	1.6 km	MPC · JPL
584803	2017 RB_{36}	—	March 2, 2006	Kitt Peak	Spacewatch	AGN	1.1 km	MPC · JPL
584804	2017 RJ_{36}	—	February 15, 2013	ESA OGS	ESA OGS	·	600 m	MPC · JPL
584805	2017 RR_{36}	—	April 6, 2002	Kitt Peak	Spacewatch	·	730 m	MPC · JPL
584806	2017 RF_{37}	—	March 2, 2006	Kitt Peak	Spacewatch	·	520 m	MPC · JPL
584807	2017 RH_{37}	—	October 13, 2013	Oukaïmeden	C. Rinner	·	1.5 km	MPC · JPL
584808	2017 RN_{37}	—	September 13, 2007	Mount Lemmon	Mount Lemmon Survey	·	1.7 km	MPC · JPL
584809	2017 RV_{39}	—	November 1, 2010	Mount Lemmon	Mount Lemmon Survey	·	880 m	MPC · JPL
584810	2017 RS_{40}	—	September 6, 2008	Mount Lemmon	Mount Lemmon Survey	·	1.4 km	MPC · JPL
584811	2017 RY_{40}	—	September 16, 2004	Kitt Peak	Spacewatch	·	1.4 km	MPC · JPL
584812	2017 RH_{41}	—	November 3, 1996	Kitt Peak	Spacewatch	·	1.7 km	MPC · JPL
584813	2017 RQ_{41}	—	September 10, 2007	Mount Lemmon	Mount Lemmon Survey	KOR	1.3 km	MPC · JPL
584814	2017 RO_{42}	—	February 5, 2011	Haleakala	Pan-STARRS 1	·	1.0 km	MPC · JPL
584815	2017 RP_{43}	—	March 11, 2003	Palomar	NEAT	MAR	1.4 km	MPC · JPL
584816	2017 RP_{44}	—	February 13, 2008	Kitt Peak	Spacewatch	NYS	1.1 km	MPC · JPL
584817	2017 RT_{44}	—	March 3, 2006	Kitt Peak	Spacewatch	·	1.4 km	MPC · JPL
584818	2017 RX_{45}	—	March 26, 2007	Kitt Peak	Spacewatch	·	680 m	MPC · JPL
584819	2017 RP_{46}	—	March 1, 2011	Mount Lemmon	Mount Lemmon Survey	·	1.4 km	MPC · JPL
584820	2017 RA_{47}	—	December 13, 2004	Mauna Kea	M. Tombelli	·	1.1 km	MPC · JPL
584821	2017 RC_{48}	—	September 17, 1995	Kitt Peak	Spacewatch	HNS	920 m	MPC · JPL
584822	2017 RR_{48}	—	October 5, 2013	Haleakala	Pan-STARRS 1	·	1.2 km	MPC · JPL
584823	2017 RZ_{50}	—	December 13, 2006	Kitt Peak	Spacewatch	·	900 m	MPC · JPL
584824	2017 RQ_{52}	—	November 30, 2008	Mount Lemmon	Mount Lemmon Survey	KOR	1.3 km	MPC · JPL
584825	2017 RZ_{54}	—	February 10, 2015	Mount Lemmon	Mount Lemmon Survey	·	1.2 km	MPC · JPL
584826	2017 RK_{56}	—	September 18, 2007	Kitt Peak	Spacewatch	EOS	1.6 km	MPC · JPL
584827	2017 RX_{56}	—	October 5, 2013	Haleakala	Pan-STARRS 1	·	1.0 km	MPC · JPL
584828	2017 RL_{57}	—	August 29, 2006	Kitt Peak	Spacewatch	·	2.4 km	MPC · JPL
584829	2017 RJ_{58}	—	October 18, 2012	Haleakala	Pan-STARRS 1	·	2.3 km	MPC · JPL
584830	2017 RV_{60}	—	August 29, 2013	Haleakala	Pan-STARRS 1	·	1.1 km	MPC · JPL
584831	2017 RR_{61}	—	February 21, 2006	Mount Lemmon	Mount Lemmon Survey	·	1.6 km	MPC · JPL
584832	2017 RS_{61}	—	October 3, 2013	Haleakala	Pan-STARRS 1	·	980 m	MPC · JPL
584833	2017 RE_{63}	—	October 21, 2012	Mount Lemmon	Mount Lemmon Survey	·	1.9 km	MPC · JPL
584834	2017 RY_{63}	—	September 13, 2007	Catalina	CSS	·	660 m	MPC · JPL
584835	2017 RZ_{64}	—	October 23, 2009	Kitt Peak	Spacewatch	·	930 m	MPC · JPL
584836	2017 RB_{66}	—	March 9, 2007	Mount Lemmon	Mount Lemmon Survey	·	1.2 km	MPC · JPL
584837	2017 RQ_{66}	—	April 24, 2006	Kitt Peak	Spacewatch	KOR	1.5 km	MPC · JPL
584838	2017 RB_{67}	—	November 16, 1995	Kitt Peak	Spacewatch	·	1.5 km	MPC · JPL
584839	2017 RJ_{67}	—	March 14, 2007	Kitt Peak	Spacewatch	·	1.6 km	MPC · JPL
584840	2017 RS_{67}	—	November 9, 2009	Kitt Peak	Spacewatch	·	1.2 km	MPC · JPL
584841	2017 RB_{68}	—	February 5, 2011	Haleakala	Pan-STARRS 1	·	1.2 km	MPC · JPL
584842	2017 RH_{68}	—	September 16, 2012	Kitt Peak	Spacewatch	EOS	1.5 km	MPC · JPL
584843	2017 RL_{68}	—	August 22, 2004	Kitt Peak	Spacewatch	·	1.3 km	MPC · JPL
584844	2017 RR_{68}	—	September 17, 2012	Mount Lemmon	Mount Lemmon Survey	·	1.6 km	MPC · JPL
584845	2017 RV_{68}	—	September 7, 2008	Mount Lemmon	Mount Lemmon Survey	AGN	990 m	MPC · JPL
584846	2017 RB_{70}	—	February 26, 2009	Mount Lemmon	Mount Lemmon Survey	·	1.7 km	MPC · JPL
584847	2017 RV_{70}	—	October 7, 2007	Mount Lemmon	Mount Lemmon Survey	·	1.5 km	MPC · JPL
584848	2017 RS_{71}	—	January 29, 2012	Mount Lemmon	Mount Lemmon Survey	·	670 m	MPC · JPL
584849	2017 RV_{71}	—	October 20, 2003	Kitt Peak	Spacewatch	KOR	1.3 km	MPC · JPL
584850	2017 RV_{74}	—	April 20, 2012	Kitt Peak	Spacewatch	·	1.2 km	MPC · JPL
584851	2017 RZ_{74}	—	April 24, 2012	Mount Lemmon	Mount Lemmon Survey	EUN	1 km	MPC · JPL
584852	2017 RC_{75}	—	February 24, 2009	Mount Lemmon	Mount Lemmon Survey	·	2.7 km	MPC · JPL
584853	2017 RZ_{75}	—	September 23, 2009	Mount Lemmon	Mount Lemmon Survey	·	910 m	MPC · JPL
584854	2017 RC_{76}	—	October 3, 2013	Mount Lemmon	Mount Lemmon Survey	·	1.3 km	MPC · JPL
584855	2017 RR_{76}	—	March 27, 2012	Kitt Peak	Spacewatch	·	1.5 km	MPC · JPL
584856	2017 RC_{78}	—	October 25, 2013	Mount Lemmon	Mount Lemmon Survey	·	1.2 km	MPC · JPL
584857	2017 RG_{78}	—	January 14, 2011	Mount Lemmon	Mount Lemmon Survey	·	1.2 km	MPC · JPL
584858	2017 RR_{78}	—	December 26, 2005	Mount Lemmon	Mount Lemmon Survey	·	1.2 km	MPC · JPL
584859	2017 RW_{79}	—	April 20, 2007	Mount Lemmon	Mount Lemmon Survey	·	1.1 km	MPC · JPL
584860	2017 RX_{80}	—	October 2, 2006	Mount Lemmon	Mount Lemmon Survey	VER	2.3 km	MPC · JPL
584861	2017 RE_{81}	—	September 20, 2008	Mount Lemmon	Mount Lemmon Survey	·	1.5 km	MPC · JPL
584862	2017 RD_{83}	—	April 1, 2003	Palomar	NEAT	·	1.2 km	MPC · JPL
584863	2017 RM_{83}	—	October 16, 2012	Mount Lemmon	Mount Lemmon Survey	·	2.4 km	MPC · JPL
584864	2017 RA_{84}	—	October 2, 2014	Kitt Peak	Spacewatch	·	520 m	MPC · JPL
584865	2017 RB_{84}	—	April 13, 2004	Kitt Peak	Spacewatch	V	620 m	MPC · JPL
584866	2017 RN_{84}	—	February 10, 2011	Mount Lemmon	Mount Lemmon Survey	NEM	1.9 km	MPC · JPL
584867	2017 RB_{85}	—	December 30, 2008	Kitt Peak	Spacewatch	·	1.5 km	MPC · JPL
584868	2017 RN_{85}	—	September 3, 2008	Kitt Peak	Spacewatch	·	1.5 km	MPC · JPL
584869	2017 RO_{85}	—	January 30, 2006	Kitt Peak	Spacewatch	AGN	1.2 km	MPC · JPL
584870	2017 RV_{85}	—	February 9, 2010	Mount Lemmon	Mount Lemmon Survey	·	1.9 km	MPC · JPL
584871	2017 RW_{85}	—	November 27, 2013	Haleakala	Pan-STARRS 1	·	1.6 km	MPC · JPL
584872	2017 RC_{86}	—	December 14, 2013	Mount Lemmon	Mount Lemmon Survey	·	1.4 km	MPC · JPL
584873	2017 RO_{87}	—	November 1, 2005	Kitt Peak	Spacewatch	(5)	810 m	MPC · JPL
584874	2017 RT_{87}	—	September 21, 2009	Mount Lemmon	Mount Lemmon Survey	·	950 m	MPC · JPL
584875	2017 RY_{87}	—	November 23, 2009	Kitt Peak	Spacewatch	(5)	1.2 km	MPC · JPL
584876	2017 RO_{88}	—	September 23, 2004	Kitt Peak	Spacewatch	EUN	1.1 km	MPC · JPL
584877	2017 RS_{88}	—	April 25, 2003	Kitt Peak	Spacewatch	·	1.6 km	MPC · JPL
584878	2017 RM_{89}	—	January 28, 2015	Haleakala	Pan-STARRS 1	·	2.5 km	MPC · JPL
584879	2017 RW_{89}	—	October 9, 2007	Mount Lemmon	Mount Lemmon Survey	·	1.8 km	MPC · JPL
584880	2017 RP_{90}	—	January 31, 2006	Kitt Peak	Spacewatch	·	1.4 km	MPC · JPL
584881	2017 RE_{91}	—	March 10, 2007	Kitt Peak	Spacewatch	·	1.4 km	MPC · JPL
584882	2017 RP_{91}	—	October 6, 2004	Kitt Peak	Spacewatch	·	1.3 km	MPC · JPL
584883	2017 RW_{91}	—	January 30, 2006	Kitt Peak	Spacewatch	·	1.4 km	MPC · JPL
584884	2017 RD_{92}	—	October 15, 2004	Mount Lemmon	Mount Lemmon Survey	·	1.4 km	MPC · JPL
584885	2017 RE_{92}	—	August 8, 2013	Haleakala	Pan-STARRS 1	·	690 m	MPC · JPL
584886	2017 RK_{92}	—	January 20, 2015	Haleakala	Pan-STARRS 1	·	1.2 km	MPC · JPL
584887	2017 RL_{92}	—	December 30, 2005	Kitt Peak	Spacewatch	·	1.6 km	MPC · JPL
584888	2017 RD_{94}	—	October 19, 1999	Kitt Peak	Spacewatch	·	1.7 km	MPC · JPL
584889	2017 RM_{95}	—	October 3, 2013	Mount Lemmon	Mount Lemmon Survey	·	850 m	MPC · JPL
584890	2017 RP_{95}	—	February 16, 2010	Mount Lemmon	Mount Lemmon Survey	AST	1.4 km	MPC · JPL
584891	2017 RQ_{96}	—	October 3, 2013	Mount Lemmon	Mount Lemmon Survey	·	920 m	MPC · JPL
584892	2017 RX_{100}	—	October 2, 2000	Anderson Mesa	LONEOS	·	1.6 km	MPC · JPL
584893	2017 RB_{101}	—	October 11, 2012	Haleakala	Pan-STARRS 1	EOS	1.4 km	MPC · JPL
584894	2017 RK_{102}	—	October 2, 2008	Kitt Peak	Spacewatch	AGN	1 km	MPC · JPL
584895	2017 RU_{102}	—	July 14, 2013	Haleakala	Pan-STARRS 1	·	1.4 km	MPC · JPL
584896	2017 RV_{102}	—	September 2, 2017	Haleakala	Pan-STARRS 1	H	340 m	MPC · JPL
584897	2017 RZ_{102}	—	February 23, 2015	Haleakala	Pan-STARRS 1	·	1.2 km	MPC · JPL
584898	2017 RC_{103}	—	August 21, 2000	Anderson Mesa	LONEOS	·	1.3 km	MPC · JPL
584899	2017 RL_{103}	—	September 16, 2006	Catalina	CSS	·	3.3 km	MPC · JPL
584900	2017 RJ_{104}	—	July 16, 2008	Charleston	R. Holmes	·	2.1 km	MPC · JPL

== 584901–585000 ==
back to top

Designation			Discovery			Properties		Ref
Permanent	Provisional	Named after	Date	Site	Discoverer(s)	Category	Diam.	Ref
584901	2017 RU_{104}	—	March 3, 2016	Haleakala	Pan-STARRS 1	EUN	880 m	MPC · JPL
584902	2017 RG_{108}	—	November 9, 2013	Mount Lemmon	Mount Lemmon Survey	·	1.1 km	MPC · JPL
584903	2017 RJ_{108}	—	January 26, 2015	Haleakala	Pan-STARRS 1	·	1.4 km	MPC · JPL
584904	2017 RW_{108}	—	October 9, 2008	Mount Lemmon	Mount Lemmon Survey	·	2.0 km	MPC · JPL
584905	2017 RL_{109}	—	December 29, 2003	Kitt Peak	Spacewatch	·	1.9 km	MPC · JPL
584906	2017 RO_{110}	—	September 14, 2017	Haleakala	Pan-STARRS 1	·	2.1 km	MPC · JPL
584907	2017 RA_{119}	—	September 12, 2017	Haleakala	Pan-STARRS 1	·	2.0 km	MPC · JPL
584908	2017 RK_{121}	—	September 2, 2017	Haleakala	Pan-STARRS 1	·	470 m	MPC · JPL
584909	2017 SL_{3}	—	October 21, 2008	Mount Lemmon	Mount Lemmon Survey	·	1.3 km	MPC · JPL
584910	2017 SF_{4}	—	November 9, 2013	Mount Lemmon	Mount Lemmon Survey	·	1.4 km	MPC · JPL
584911	2017 SX_{4}	—	January 27, 2015	Haleakala	Pan-STARRS 1	·	1.5 km	MPC · JPL
584912	2017 SW_{7}	—	September 16, 2017	Haleakala	Pan-STARRS 1	·	1.9 km	MPC · JPL
584913	2017 SM_{14}	—	November 10, 2013	Kitt Peak	Spacewatch	·	1.6 km	MPC · JPL
584914	2017 SJ_{15}	—	December 31, 2013	Mayhill-ISON	L. Elenin	·	1.9 km	MPC · JPL
584915	2017 SW_{16}	—	June 3, 2011	Mount Lemmon	Mount Lemmon Survey	H	410 m	MPC · JPL
584916	2017 SC_{23}	—	October 1, 2008	Mount Lemmon	Mount Lemmon Survey	·	1.8 km	MPC · JPL
584917	2017 SD_{23}	—	August 27, 2000	Cerro Tololo	Deep Ecliptic Survey	·	2.5 km	MPC · JPL
584918	2017 SJ_{23}	—	April 20, 2012	Mount Lemmon	Mount Lemmon Survey	·	780 m	MPC · JPL
584919	2017 ST_{24}	—	July 19, 2007	Mount Lemmon	Mount Lemmon Survey	KOR	1.2 km	MPC · JPL
584920	2017 SW_{25}	—	March 20, 2002	Kitt Peak	Deep Ecliptic Survey	·	1.4 km	MPC · JPL
584921	2017 SF_{30}	—	March 21, 2015	Haleakala	Pan-STARRS 1	·	1.7 km	MPC · JPL
584922	2017 SR_{30}	—	April 28, 2011	Mount Lemmon	Mount Lemmon Survey	DOR	1.8 km	MPC · JPL
584923	2017 SM_{31}	—	April 21, 2012	Mount Lemmon	Mount Lemmon Survey	EUN	920 m	MPC · JPL
584924	2017 SQ_{31}	—	November 7, 2007	Kitt Peak	Spacewatch	·	1.7 km	MPC · JPL
584925	2017 SK_{32}	—	October 23, 2003	Kitt Peak	Deep Ecliptic Survey	KOR	1.2 km	MPC · JPL
584926	2017 SR_{33}	—	September 28, 2008	Mount Lemmon	Mount Lemmon Survey	·	1.5 km	MPC · JPL
584927	2017 SZ_{35}	—	November 27, 2013	Haleakala	Pan-STARRS 1	·	1.1 km	MPC · JPL
584928	2017 SG_{37}	—	October 26, 2013	Mount Lemmon	Mount Lemmon Survey	·	1.5 km	MPC · JPL
584929	2017 SK_{37}	—	November 20, 2009	Kitt Peak	Spacewatch	EUN	1.4 km	MPC · JPL
584930	2017 SP_{37}	—	August 2, 2011	Haleakala	Pan-STARRS 1	·	2.6 km	MPC · JPL
584931	2017 SF_{38}	—	April 12, 2016	Haleakala	Pan-STARRS 1	ADE	1.6 km	MPC · JPL
584932	2017 SR_{38}	—	January 22, 2015	Haleakala	Pan-STARRS 1	·	1.7 km	MPC · JPL
584933	2017 SN_{39}	—	June 15, 2004	Socorro	LINEAR	·	1.6 km	MPC · JPL
584934	2017 SO_{39}	—	January 13, 2015	Haleakala	Pan-STARRS 1	·	2.1 km	MPC · JPL
584935	2017 SH_{40}	—	September 5, 2008	Kitt Peak	Spacewatch	·	1.5 km	MPC · JPL
584936	2017 SW_{41}	—	March 19, 2009	Pla D'Arguines	R. Ferrando, C. Segarra	EOS	1.5 km	MPC · JPL
584937	2017 SA_{42}	—	September 25, 2011	Haleakala	Pan-STARRS 1	·	2.6 km	MPC · JPL
584938	2017 SQ_{42}	—	October 29, 2005	Catalina	CSS	·	1.5 km	MPC · JPL
584939	2017 SW_{42}	—	December 30, 2008	Mount Lemmon	Mount Lemmon Survey	NAE	1.9 km	MPC · JPL
584940	2017 SM_{43}	—	September 26, 2013	Mount Lemmon	Mount Lemmon Survey	·	1.0 km	MPC · JPL
584941	2017 SR_{43}	—	November 10, 2013	Mount Lemmon	Mount Lemmon Survey	·	1.6 km	MPC · JPL
584942	2017 ST_{43}	—	January 17, 2008	Kitt Peak	Spacewatch	·	2.3 km	MPC · JPL
584943	2017 SW_{43}	—	September 10, 2013	Haleakala	Pan-STARRS 1	·	1.3 km	MPC · JPL
584944	2017 SZ_{43}	—	February 4, 2000	Kitt Peak	Spacewatch	·	2.0 km	MPC · JPL
584945	2017 SR_{44}	—	October 15, 2007	Kitt Peak	Spacewatch	·	1.6 km	MPC · JPL
584946	2017 SD_{45}	—	October 3, 2013	Kitt Peak	Spacewatch	·	1.4 km	MPC · JPL
584947 Shistovsky	2017 SM_{46}	Shistovsky	September 2, 2008	Zelenchukskaya	T. V. Krjačko	·	1.6 km	MPC · JPL
584948	2017 SR_{46}	—	November 21, 2009	Kitt Peak	Spacewatch	·	1.7 km	MPC · JPL
584949	2017 SN_{47}	—	August 16, 2017	Haleakala	Pan-STARRS 1	·	1.5 km	MPC · JPL
584950	2017 SR_{47}	—	October 27, 2005	Kitt Peak	Spacewatch	·	1.1 km	MPC · JPL
584951	2017 SV_{47}	—	October 15, 2013	Mount Lemmon	Mount Lemmon Survey	·	1.2 km	MPC · JPL
584952	2017 SZ_{47}	—	October 3, 2013	Kitt Peak	Spacewatch	WIT	840 m	MPC · JPL
584953	2017 SA_{48}	—	August 14, 2004	Cerro Tololo	Deep Ecliptic Survey	·	1.3 km	MPC · JPL
584954	2017 SQ_{48}	—	February 10, 2011	Mount Lemmon	Mount Lemmon Survey	·	1.1 km	MPC · JPL
584955	2017 ST_{48}	—	July 30, 2008	Mount Lemmon	Mount Lemmon Survey	·	1.5 km	MPC · JPL
584956	2017 SV_{51}	—	January 1, 2012	Mount Lemmon	Mount Lemmon Survey	·	700 m	MPC · JPL
584957	2017 SX_{51}	—	March 13, 2007	Mount Lemmon	Mount Lemmon Survey	KON	1.5 km	MPC · JPL
584958	2017 SD_{52}	—	September 9, 2008	Mount Lemmon	Mount Lemmon Survey	·	1.9 km	MPC · JPL
584959	2017 SF_{52}	—	September 4, 2008	Kitt Peak	Spacewatch	·	1.4 km	MPC · JPL
584960	2017 SO_{52}	—	March 1, 2008	Mount Lemmon	Mount Lemmon Survey	·	2.6 km	MPC · JPL
584961	2017 SN_{54}	—	October 11, 2004	Kitt Peak	Spacewatch	·	1.6 km	MPC · JPL
584962	2017 SK_{55}	—	February 12, 2015	Haleakala	Pan-STARRS 1	(5)	1.1 km	MPC · JPL
584963	2017 SO_{55}	—	June 9, 2016	Haleakala	Pan-STARRS 1	·	860 m	MPC · JPL
584964	2017 SZ_{55}	—	January 6, 2010	Mount Lemmon	Mount Lemmon Survey	WIT	750 m	MPC · JPL
584965	2017 SB_{57}	—	February 24, 2012	Mount Lemmon	Mount Lemmon Survey	·	860 m	MPC · JPL
584966	2017 SR_{57}	—	June 5, 2016	Haleakala	Pan-STARRS 1	EUN	1.0 km	MPC · JPL
584967	2017 SD_{58}	—	October 6, 2008	Mount Lemmon	Mount Lemmon Survey	·	2.0 km	MPC · JPL
584968	2017 SX_{58}	—	September 27, 2009	Mount Lemmon	Mount Lemmon Survey	·	1.0 km	MPC · JPL
584969	2017 SB_{59}	—	April 10, 2008	Kitt Peak	Spacewatch	·	960 m	MPC · JPL
584970	2017 ST_{59}	—	December 11, 2013	Haleakala	Pan-STARRS 1	·	1.3 km	MPC · JPL
584971	2017 SD_{60}	—	March 27, 2015	Haleakala	Pan-STARRS 1	·	1.6 km	MPC · JPL
584972	2017 SM_{60}	—	November 26, 2014	Haleakala	Pan-STARRS 1	·	560 m	MPC · JPL
584973	2017 SP_{60}	—	May 9, 2007	Kitt Peak	Spacewatch	·	810 m	MPC · JPL
584974	2017 SA_{62}	—	June 5, 2016	Haleakala	Pan-STARRS 1	·	630 m	MPC · JPL
584975	2017 SN_{62}	—	September 25, 2001	Palomar	NEAT	EOS	2.3 km	MPC · JPL
584976	2017 SY_{62}	—	November 19, 2003	Kitt Peak	Spacewatch	·	740 m	MPC · JPL
584977	2017 SY_{63}	—	October 1, 1995	Kitt Peak	Spacewatch	·	1.5 km	MPC · JPL
584978	2017 SH_{64}	—	September 23, 1995	Kitt Peak	Spacewatch	THM	1.5 km	MPC · JPL
584979	2017 SL_{64}	—	October 3, 2013	Haleakala	Pan-STARRS 1	·	1.1 km	MPC · JPL
584980	2017 SC_{66}	—	March 10, 2011	Kitt Peak	Spacewatch	EUN	1.0 km	MPC · JPL
584981	2017 SK_{67}	—	January 31, 2006	Kitt Peak	Spacewatch	·	1.0 km	MPC · JPL
584982	2017 SF_{68}	—	March 28, 2003	La Silla	G. Masi, Michelsen, R.	·	1.5 km	MPC · JPL
584983	2017 SP_{70}	—	September 26, 2006	Mount Lemmon	Mount Lemmon Survey	·	1.8 km	MPC · JPL
584984	2017 SW_{70}	—	March 21, 2015	Haleakala	Pan-STARRS 1	VER	2.0 km	MPC · JPL
584985	2017 SP_{72}	—	November 27, 2014	Haleakala	Pan-STARRS 1	·	930 m	MPC · JPL
584986	2017 SW_{73}	—	October 9, 2012	Haleakala	Pan-STARRS 1	·	2.0 km	MPC · JPL
584987	2017 SN_{74}	—	November 29, 2003	Kitt Peak	Spacewatch	·	1.8 km	MPC · JPL
584988	2017 SL_{75}	—	January 23, 2006	Kitt Peak	Spacewatch	·	1.9 km	MPC · JPL
584989	2017 SP_{75}	—	November 5, 2007	Mount Lemmon	Mount Lemmon Survey	·	980 m	MPC · JPL
584990	2017 SE_{76}	—	March 26, 2009	Mount Lemmon	Mount Lemmon Survey	·	2.7 km	MPC · JPL
584991	2017 SL_{77}	—	September 2, 2008	Kitt Peak	Spacewatch	·	1.2 km	MPC · JPL
584992	2017 SR_{77}	—	August 10, 2007	Kitt Peak	Spacewatch	KOR	1.3 km	MPC · JPL
584993	2017 SU_{77}	—	October 29, 2008	Mount Lemmon	Mount Lemmon Survey	·	1.6 km	MPC · JPL
584994	2017 SV_{77}	—	March 11, 2005	Mount Lemmon	Mount Lemmon Survey	·	1.5 km	MPC · JPL
584995	2017 SE_{78}	—	November 11, 2013	Kitt Peak	Spacewatch	·	1.3 km	MPC · JPL
584996	2017 SL_{78}	—	September 6, 2008	Mount Lemmon	Mount Lemmon Survey	·	1.3 km	MPC · JPL
584997	2017 SJ_{79}	—	March 21, 2015	Haleakala	Pan-STARRS 1	KOR	1.1 km	MPC · JPL
584998	2017 SF_{80}	—	August 14, 2013	Haleakala	Pan-STARRS 1	NYS	810 m	MPC · JPL
584999	2017 SS_{80}	—	November 28, 2013	Catalina	CSS	·	1.3 km	MPC · JPL
585000	2017 SX_{80}	—	November 12, 2006	Mount Lemmon	Mount Lemmon Survey	·	1.2 km	MPC · JPL

back to top

== Meaning of names ==
As minor planet discoveries are confirmed, they are given a permanent number by the IAU's Minor Planet Center (MPC), and the discoverers can then submit names for them, following the IAU's naming conventions. The list below concerns those minor planets in the specified number-range that have received names, and explains the meanings of those names.

Official naming citations of newly named small Solar System bodies are approved and published in a bulletin by IAU's Working Group for Small Bodies Nomenclature (WGSBN). Before May 2021, citations were published in MPC's Minor Planet Circulars for many decades. Recent citations can also be found on the JPL Small-Body Database (SBDB). Until his death in 2016, German astronomer Lutz D. Schmadel compiled these citations into the Dictionary of Minor Planet Names (DMP) and regularly updated the collection.

Based on Paul Herget's The Names of the Minor Planets, Schmadel also researched the unclear origin of numerous asteroids, most of which had been named prior to World War II. This article incorporates text from this source, which is in the public domain: SBDB New namings may only be added to this list below after official publication as the preannouncement of names is condemned. The WGSBN publishes a comprehensive guideline for the naming rules of non-cometary small Solar System bodies.

Named minor planet	Provisional	This minor planet was named for...	Ref · Catalog
584311 Pozhlakov	2016 VD_{1}	Stanislav Ivanovich Pozhlakov (1937–2003), Soviet composer, musician and singer.	IAU · 584311
584947 Shistovsky	2017 SM_{46}	Konstantin Nikolaevich Shistovsky, Russian astronomer, inventor, writer, and the first director of the Moscow Planetarium.	IAU · 584947
