= AT 2018hyz =

Tidal disruption event

AT2018hyz
- Event type: Tidal disruption event
- Constellation: Sextans
- Right ascension: 10^{h} 06^{m} 50.871^{s}
- Declination: +01° 41′ 34.08″
- Distance: 665 million light years (204 Mpc)
- Redshift: 0.04573
- Host: 2MASS J10065085+0141342

AT2018hyz is a tidal disruption event (TDE) that was discovered in 2018 by the All Sky Automated Survey for SuperNovae (ASASS-SN).

== History ==
In 2022, astronomers announced the discovery of radio emission from AT2018hyz using the Australian SKA Pathfinder (ASKAP) telescope. Additional detections using the Very Large Array (VLA), MeerKAT, and the Australia Telescope Compact Array (ATCA) were published soon afterwards. The emission is still rising rapidly, and was initially interpreted as an outflow of material that was "burped" several years after the initial TDE from the accretion disk of the supermassive black hole, traveling at up to half the speed of light. Alternatively, it has been proposed that the delayed radio emission from AT2018hyz could be explained by an off-axis astrophysical jet, which launched promptly when the black hole consumed material (similar to the TDE Swift J1644+57), and radio emission only became visible later when it entered our line of sight.

== Host galaxy ==
The host galaxy for AT2018hyz is 2MASS J10065085+0141342, known as LEDA 3119592 or 2dFGRS TGN421Z052, located at redshift z = 0.04573. It is classified as a dormant post starburst galaxy or a type E+A galaxy. Based on studies, the host galaxy's redshift has a g-band visual magnitude of -20.2, with the galaxy containing a low-mass black hole measuring 10^{6} M_{☉}.

== See also ==
- AT2019qiz
- RX J1242-11
