= C/2018 N2 (ASASSN) =

Parabolic comet

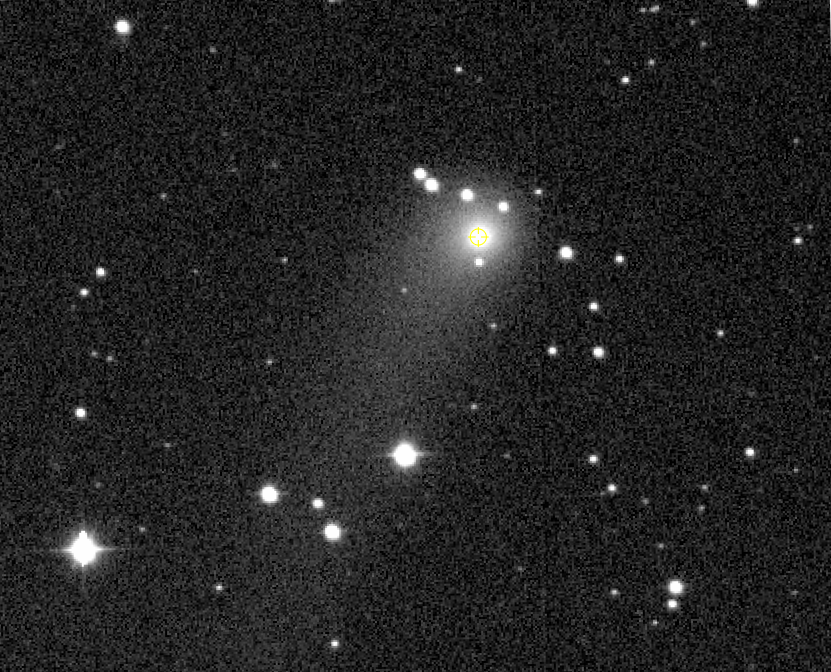
- C/2018 N2 photographed from the Zwicky Transient Facility on 11 November 2019

Discovery
- Discovered by: All Sky Automated Survey for SuperNovae (ASAS-SN)
- Discovery site: Cerro Tololo Observatory, Chile
- Discovery date: 7 July 2018

Designations
- Alternative designations: CK18N020

Orbital characteristics
- Epoch: 26 February 2020 (JD 2458905.5)
- Observation arc: 1,421 days (3.89 years)
- Number of observations: 4,653
- Perihelion: 3.125 AU
- Eccentricity: 1.00018
- Inclination: 77.530°
- Longitude of ascending node: 25.258°
- Argument of periapsis: 24.397°
- Last perihelion: 10 November 2019
- T_{Jupiter}: 0.474
- Earth MOID: 2.1943 AU
- Jupiter MOID: 1.6361 AU

Physical characteristics
- Mean radius: 6.35 km (3.95 mi)
- Comet total magnitude (M1): 9.6
- Apparent magnitude: 11.0 (2019 apparition)

C/2018 N2 (ASASSN) is the second of two comets discovered by the All Sky Automated Survey for SuperNovae after C/2017 O1. It is a non-periodic comet that reached perihelion in November 2019, and as a result, it may never return to the inner Solar System.

== Discovery and observation ==
The comet was first spotted as a magnitude 16.4 object by the ASAS-SN survey from images taken at the Cerro Tololo Observatory's 14-cm "Cassius" telescope between 7–11 July 2018. It made its closest approach to Earth on 19 October 2019 at a distance of 205 million mi (330 million km) before reaching perihelion on 11 November 2019. Although it did not go closer than 3.12 AU from the Sun at perihelion, observations of the comet did show some significant signs of activity, including a dust tail forming around July 2019. It was last observed as a magnitude 20+ object on 28 May 2022.
