= NGC 2805 =

Galaxy in the constellation Ursa Major

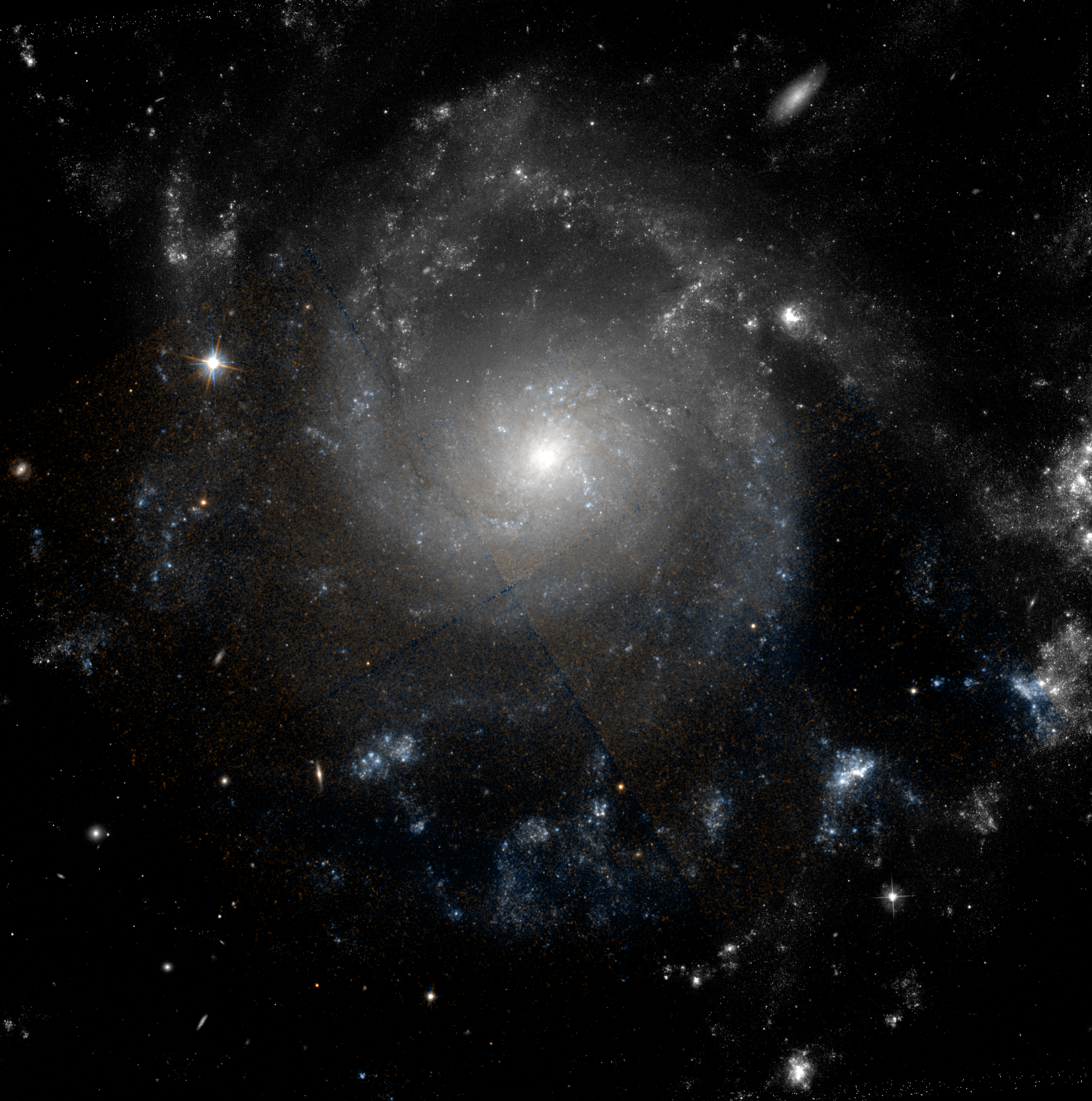
- NGC 2805 imaged by the Hubble Space Telescope

Observation data (J2000 epoch)
- Constellation: Ursa Major
- Right ascension: 09^{h} 20^{m} 20.3551^{s}
- Declination: +64° 06′ 10.771″
- Redshift: 0.005779
- Heliocentric radial velocity: 1733 ± 1 km/s
- Distance: 88.2 ± 6.2 Mly (27.05 ± 1.90 Mpc)
- Apparent magnitude (V): 11.0

Characteristics
- Type: SAB(rs)d
- Size: ~90,800 ly (27.84 kpc) (estimated)
- Apparent size (V): 6.3′ × 4.8′

Other designations
- HOLM 124B, IRAS 09162+6418, 2MASX J09202040+6406099, UGC 4936, MCG +11-12-003, PGC 26410, CGCG 312-002

NGC 2805 is an intermediate spiral galaxy in the constellation of Ursa Major. Its velocity with respect to the cosmic microwave background is 1834 ± 7 km/s, which corresponds to a Hubble distance of 27.05 ± 1.90 Mpc (~88.2 million light-years). However, 11 non redshift measurements give a distance of 12.76 ± 11.89 Mpc (41.6 million light-years). (Note: This sample of measurements is inconsistent: seven values between 3.03 Mpc and 5.13 Mpc are reported in publications from 1984 to 1985, then four values between 26.8 Mpc and 28.8 Mpc.) The galaxy was discovered by German-British astronomer William Herschel on 2 April 1791.

== NGC 2805 Group ==
NGC 2805 is the namesake of the NGC 2805 group (also known as LGG 173), which includes at least 4 other galaxies: NGC 2814, NGC 2820, NGC 2880, and IC 2458. This group, minus NGC 2880, are also collectively called Holmberg 124.

== Supernova ==
One supernova has been observed in NGC 2805: SN 2019hsw (Type II, mag. 15.4) was discovered by ASAS-SN on 18 June 2019.

== See also ==
- List of NGC objects (2001–3000)
