= NGC 7735 =

Galaxy in the constellation Pegasus

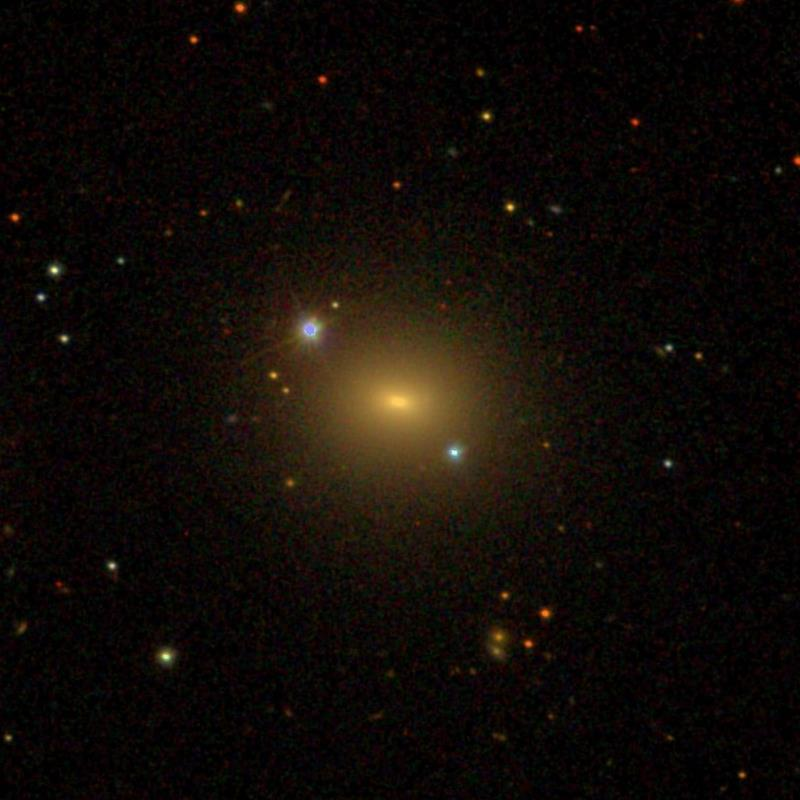
- NGC 7735 imaged by SDSS

Observation data (J2000 epoch)
- Constellation: Pegasus
- Right ascension: 23^{h} 42^{m} 17.3238^{s}
- Declination: +26° 13′ 54.299″
- Redshift: 0.032009
- Heliocentric radial velocity: 9596 ± 27 km/s
- Distance: 444.9 ± 31.2 Mly (136.41 ± 9.57 Mpc)
- Apparent magnitude (V): 13.7

Characteristics
- Type: E
- Size: ~179,800 ly (55.13 kpc) (estimated)
- Apparent size (V): 1.3′ × 0.9′

Other designations
- 2MASX J23421730+2613544, UGC 12744, MCG +04-55-046, PGC 72165, CGCG 476-115

NGC 7735 is an elliptical galaxy in the constellation of Pegasus. Its velocity with respect to the cosmic microwave background is 9249 ± 36 km/s, which corresponds to a Hubble distance of 136.41 ± 9.57 Mpc (~445 million light-years). It was discovered by British astronomer John Herschel on 5 September 1828.

One supernova has been observed in NGC 7735: SN 2024we (Type Ia, mag 17) was discovered by ASAS-SN on 11 January 2024.

== See also ==
- List of NGC objects (7001–7840)
