= Beatrice M. Tinsley Prize =

The Beatrice M. Tinsley Prize is awarded every other year by the American Astronomical Society in recognition of an outstanding research contribution to astronomy or astrophysics of an exceptionally creative or innovative character. The prize is named in honor of the cosmologist and astronomer Beatrice Tinsley.

The prize is normally awarded every second year, but was awarded in 2021 out of the established sequence.

== Recipients ==
Recipients of the Beatrice M. Tinsley Prize include:

- 1986 Jocelyn Bell Burnell — discovery of first pulsar
- 1988 Harold I. Ewen, Edward M. Purcell — discovery of 21 cm radiation from hydrogen
- 1990 Antoine Labeyrie — speckle interferometry
- 1992 Robert H. Dicke — lock-in amplifier
- 1994 Raymond Davis, Jr. — neutrino detectors; first measurement of solar neutrinos
- 1996 Aleksander Wolszczan — first pulsar planet
- 1998 Robert E. Williams — astronomical spectroscopy, particularly in gas clouds
- 2000 Charles R. Alcock — search for massive compact halo objects
- 2002 Geoffrey Marcy, R. Paul Butler, Steven S. Vogt — ultra-high-resolution Doppler spectroscopy; discovery of extrasolar planets by radial velocity measurements
- 2004 Ronald J. Reynolds — studies of the interstellar medium
- 2006 John E. Carlstrom — cosmic microwave background using the Sunyaev–Zeldovich effect
- 2008 Mark Reid — astrometry experiments with the VLBI and the VLBA; pioneering use of cosmic masers as astronomical tools
- 2010 Drake Deming — thermal infrared emission from transiting extrasolar planets
- 2012 Ronald L. Gilliland — ultra-high signal-to-noise observations related to time-domain photometry
- 2014 Chris Lintott — engaging non-scientists in cutting edge research
- 2016 Andrew Gould — gravitational microlensing
- 2018 Julianne Dalcanton — low-surface-brightness galaxies; Hubble Space Telescope surveys
- 2020 Krzysztof Stanek, Christopher Kochanek — time-domain astronomy; leadership in the All Sky Automated Survey for SuperNovae (ASAS-SN)
- 2021 Bill Paxton — MESA software for computational stellar astrophysics
- 2024 Dennis Zaritsky — innovative observations probing the structure and evolution of galaxies
- 2026 Kailash Sahu — Detection of the first isolated stellar-mass black hole, and the first mass measurement of a white dwarf through relativistic deflection due to microlensing

== See also ==
- List of astronomy awards
