= NGC 5784 =

Galaxy in the constellation Boötes

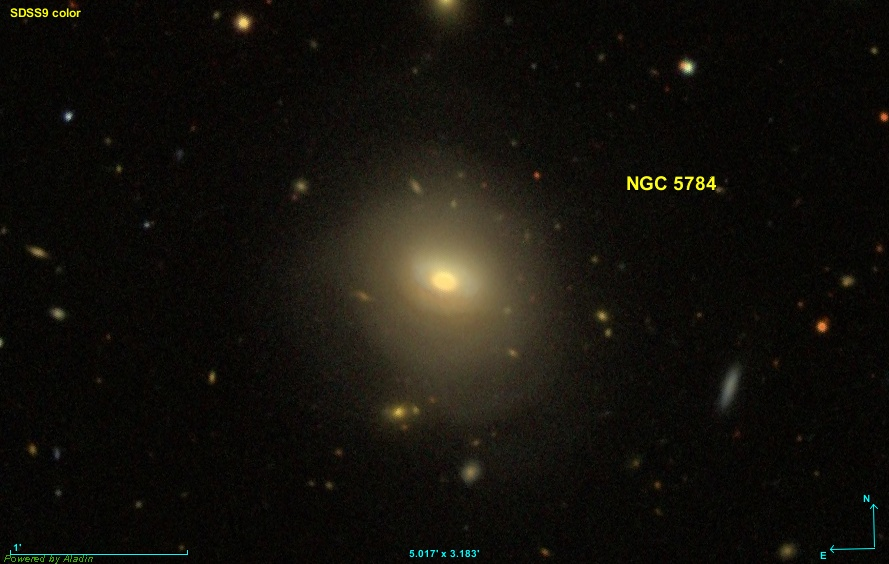
- NGC 5784 imaged by Sloan Digital Sky Survey

Observation data (J2000 epoch)
- Constellation: Boötes
- Right ascension: 14^{h} 54^{m} 16.4726^{s}
- Declination: +42° 33′ 28.356″
- Redshift: 0.017912
- Heliocentric radial velocity: 5370 ± 16 km/s
- Distance: 264.2 ± 18.5 Mly (81.01 ± 5.68 Mpc)
- Apparent magnitude (V): 12.4

Characteristics
- Type: S0
- Size: ~149,400 ly (45.82 kpc) (estimated)
- Apparent size (V): 1.9′ × 1.8′

Other designations
- IRAS 14524+4245, 2MASX J14541645+4233279, UGC 9592, MCG +07-31-006, PGC 53265, CGCG 221-009

NGC 5784 is a lenticular galaxy in the constellation of Boötes. Its velocity with respect to the cosmic microwave background is 5493 ± 18 km/s, which corresponds to a Hubble distance of 81.01 ± 5.68 Mpc (~264 million light-years). It was discovered by German-British astronomer William Herschel on 9 April 1787.

== NGC 5739 Group ==
According to Abraham Mahtessian, NGC 5784 is part of the seven member NGC 5739 group (also known as [M98j] 234). The other six galaxies are: NGC 5598, NGC 5603, NGC 5696, NGC 5739, NGC 5787, and NGC 5860.

== Supernovae ==
Two supernovae have been observed in NGC 5784:

- SN 2018mef (Type Ia, mag. 17.52) was discovered by the Zwicky Transient Facility on 7 June 2018.
- SN 2023bch (Type Ia, mag. 15.4) was discovered by ASAS-SN on 30 January 2023.

== See also ==
- List of NGC objects (5001–6000)
