= V906 Carinae =

2018 nova that occurred in the constellation Carina

- Location of V906 Carinae (circled)

Observation data Epoch J2000.0 Equinox ICRS
- Constellation: Carina
- Right ascension: 10^{h} 36^{m} 15.428^{s}
- Declination: −59° 35′ 53.67″
- Apparent magnitude (V): 5.8 – 19.9

Characteristics
- Variable type: Classical nova

Astrometry
| Proper motion (μ) | RA: −7.511 mas/yr Dec.: +3.267 mas/yr |
| Parallax (π) | 0.3140±0.3113 mas |
| Distance | 3300+2900 −1500 pc |

Details

White dwarf
| Mass | 0.71+0.23 −0.19 M_{☉} |
| Radius | 0.03 R_{☉} |
| Luminosity | 0.28 L_{☉} |
| Temperature | 15,000 K |

Donor
| Mass | 0.23 - 0.43 M_{☉} |
| Radius | ~0.24 R_{☉} |
| Luminosity | 0.03 L_{☉} |
| Temperature | 4,951 K |

Other designations
- ASASSN-18fv, Nova Carinae 2018, V906 Car, Gaia DR2 5254540166225866496

Database references
| SIMBAD | data |

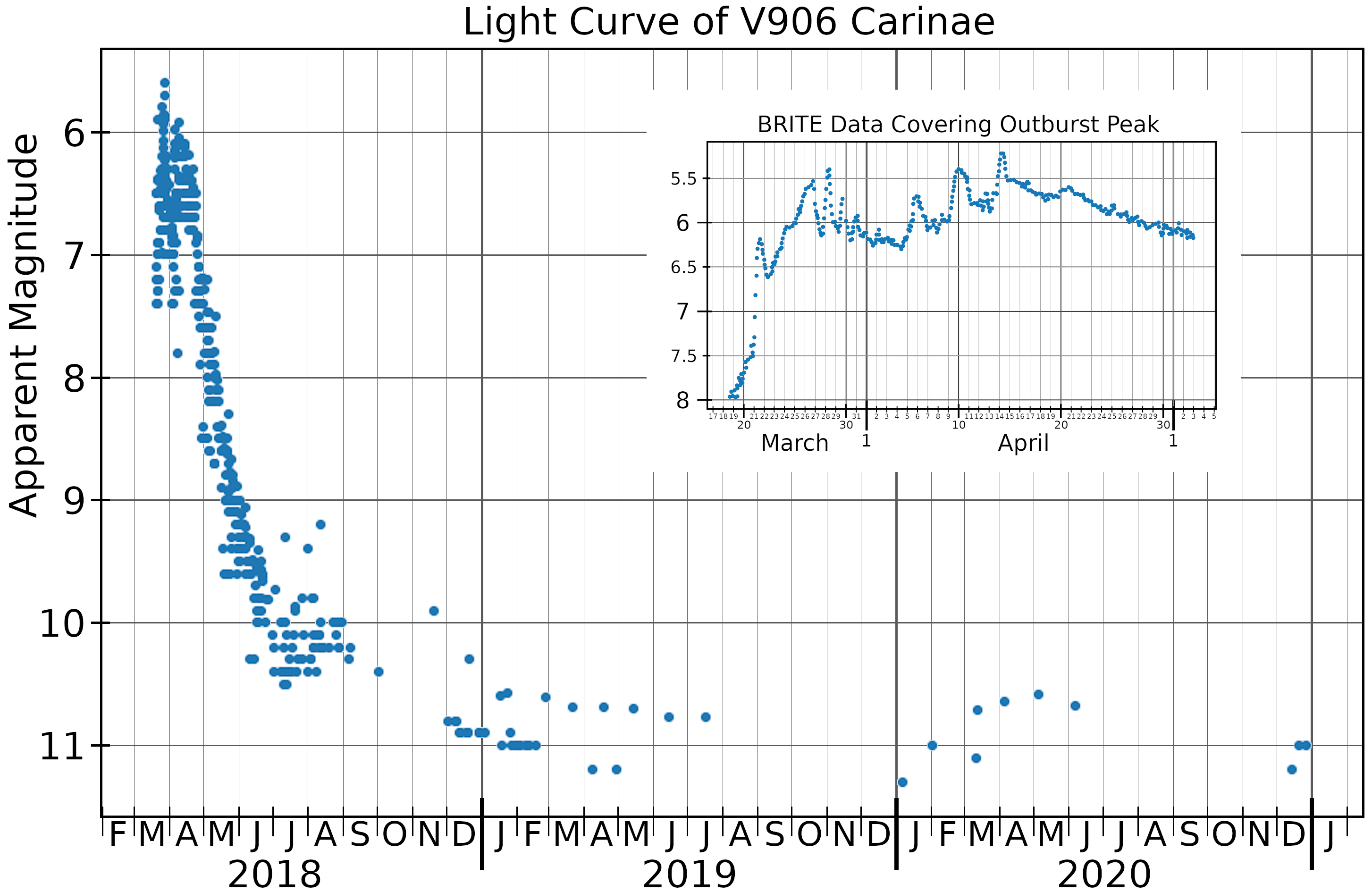
The light curve of V906 Carinae, plotted from AAVSO data. The data from BRITE is shown on the inset plot.

V906 Carinae, also known as Nova Carinae 2018, was a nova in the Milky Way galaxy which appeared in the constellation Carina, near the 5th magnitude star HD 92063. It was discovered on images taken on 20.32 March 2018 by the All Sky Automated Survey for SuperNovae (ASAS-SN] telescope at the Cerro Tololo Inter-American Observatory. The ASAS-SN group assigned the name ASASSN-18fv to the object. The discovery image was saturated, allowing researchers to determine only that the object was brighter than apparent magnitude 10. An earlier image obtained by ASAS-SN on 26.32 March 2018 showed the nova was a magnitude ~10.4 object at that time, and the object was not detected on ASAS-SN images taken on 15.34 March 2018 and earlier.

V906 Carinae was featured in the Astronomy Picture of the Day on 25 March 2018.

Pre-discovery images of V906 Carinae were matched to a star of Gaia magnitude 20.1. On 21 March 2018, it had brightened to a Gaia magnitude 7.80 (visual magnitude 7.45), and to magnitude 6.62 later the same day. Also on 21 March 2018, long exposure spectrographic measurements of ASASSN-18fv, specifically in the 3800Å to 7300Å range, were captured using CCD imaging. Detailed analysis of the spectral data confirmed that ASASSN-18fv exhibited characteristics of a classical nova.

All novae are binary stars, with a "donor" star orbiting a white dwarf. The two stars are so close to each other that material is transferred from the donor to the white dwarf. In the case of V906 Carinae, data from the Transiting Exoplanet Survey Satellite suggests that the binary system has an orbital period of either 1.641 hours or twice that value. The mass of the white dwarf has been estimated to be 0.71 M_{☉}, and the donor is believed to be a dwarf of spectral type K or M and a mass of 0.23 - 0.43 M_{☉}.

One of the stars monitored by the Bright-star Target Explorer (BRITE) nanosatellite constellation was HD 92063. V906 Carinae was close enough to that star to be serendipitously observed by BRITE. In the BRITE data, the nova's maximum brightness occurred on 14 April 2018. BRITE provided a measurement of the nova's brightness every 1.6 hours, allowing the fluctuations near the peak of the outburst to be seen clearly. There were eight post-maximum flares with amplitudes of a few tenths of a magnitude each of which lasted 1 to 3 days. These flares in the visible portion of the EM spectrum occurred at the same times that γ-ray flares were seen by Fermi-LAT. Because the γ-ray flares are believed to arise from shocks in the ejected material, their correlation with visible flares suggests that most of the visible light from the nova may be produced in shocks, rather than the nuclear burning on the white dwarf's surface.
