= V5856 Sagittarii =

Nova that occurred in 2016

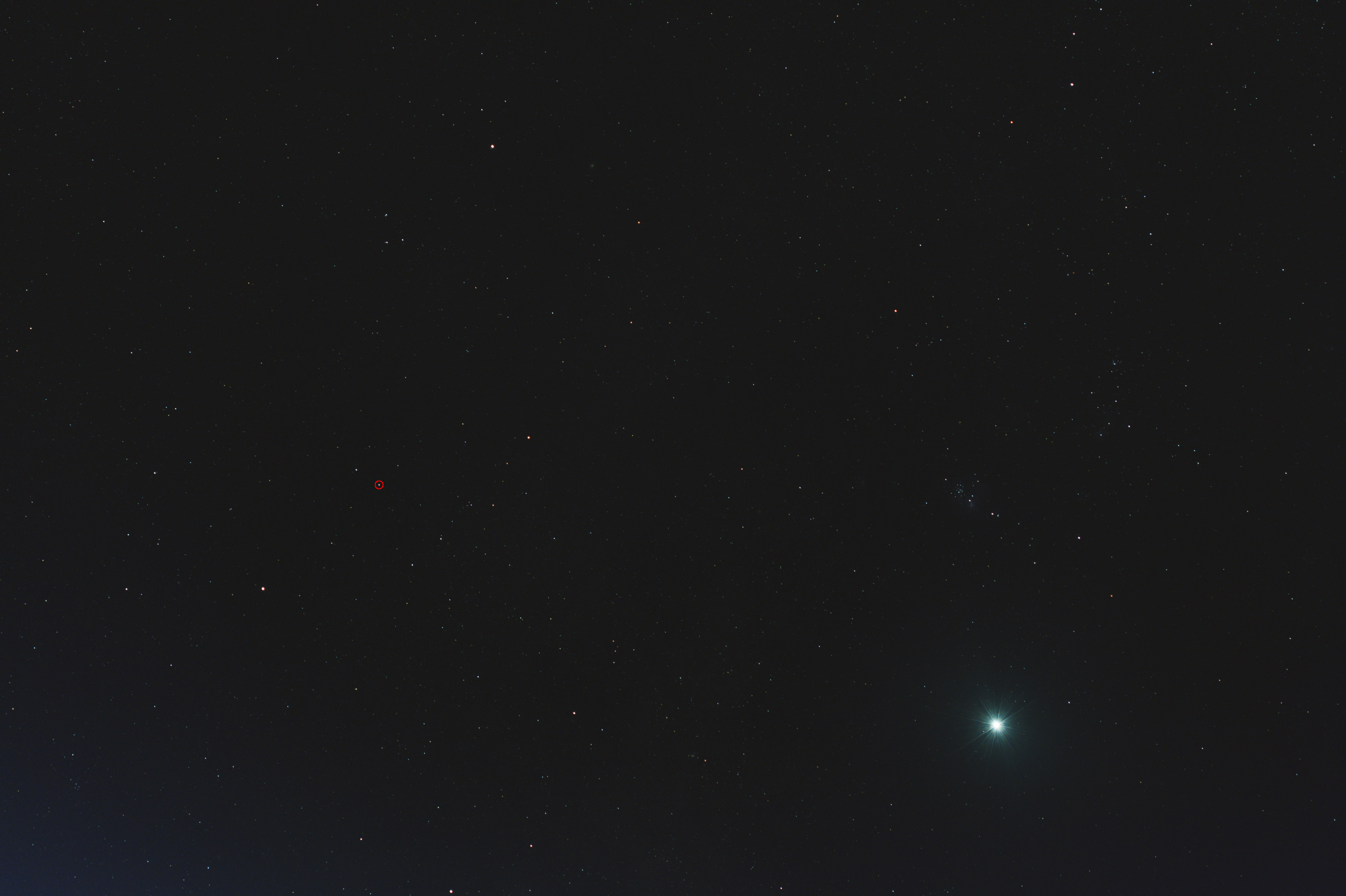
- V5856 Sagittarii (left of center, circled in red) near its peak brightness and Venus (lower right)

Observation data Epoch J2000 Equinox ICRS
- Constellation: Sagittarius
- Right ascension: 18^{h} 20^{m} 52.25^{s}
- Declination: −28° 22′ 12.1″
- Apparent magnitude (V): 5.4 – <22

Characteristics
- Variable type: Nova

Astrometry
Distance	4200+1200 −900 pc

Other designations
- PNV J18205200-2822100, ASASSN-16ma, V5856 Sgr, Nova Sagittarii 2016 No. 4

Database references
SIMBAD	data

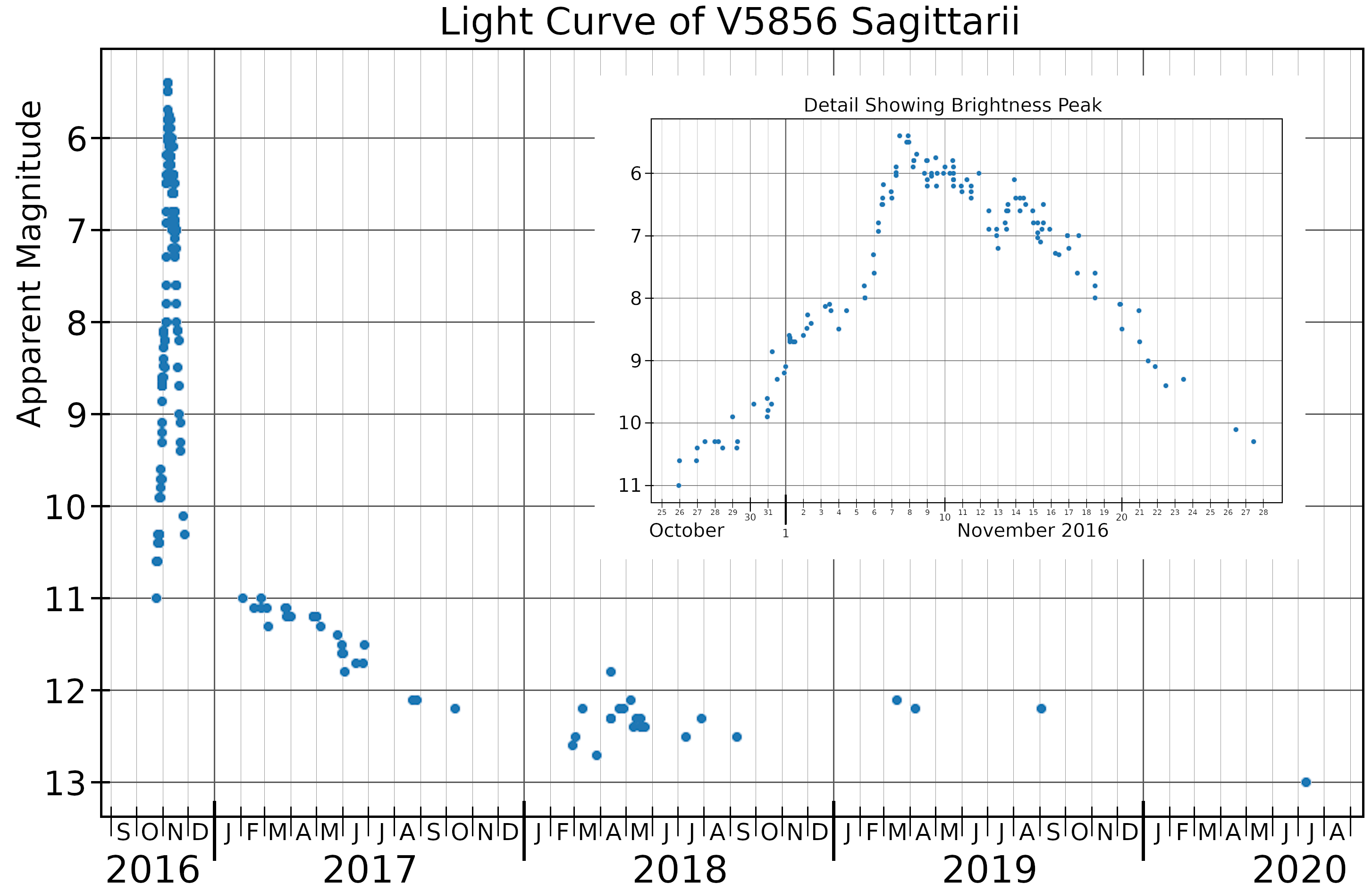
The light curve of V5856 Sagittarii plotted from AAVSO data

V5856 Sagittarii, also known as Nova Sagittarii 2016 Number 4, was the 4th and brightest nova that occurred in the constellation Sagittarius during 2016. It was discovered by the All Sky Automated Survey for SuperNovae (which assigned to it the name ASASSN-16ma) on 25.2 October 2016, at which time it had an apparent visual magnitude of 13.7. It was independently discovered by Yukio Sakurai of Mito, Ibaraki, Japan on 26.38 October 2016, by which time it had reached magnitude 10.4. It reached its peak brightness of magnitude 5.4, making it visible to the naked eye, on 8 November 2016. The nova occurred within a region of the sky monitored by the OGLE microlensing experiment, and that group reported that no star brighter than magnitude 22 (I band) was seen at the nova's position prior to its eruption.

V5856 Sagittarii declined from peak brightness rapidly, fading by 2 magnitudes in 11.3 days, and 3 magnitudes in 14.5 days. It is therefore classified as a "fast" nova in the classification scheme of Cecilia Payne-Gaposchkin. The nova showed two peaks: a "fireball" peak corresponding to the freely expanding material ejected from the eruption and, nearly a week later, a second brighter peak coincident in time with the detection of γ-rays from the nova by Fermi-LAT. The fireball peak occurred at different times depending upon the wavelength of light being observed, but the second peak occurred at the same time for all wavelengths.

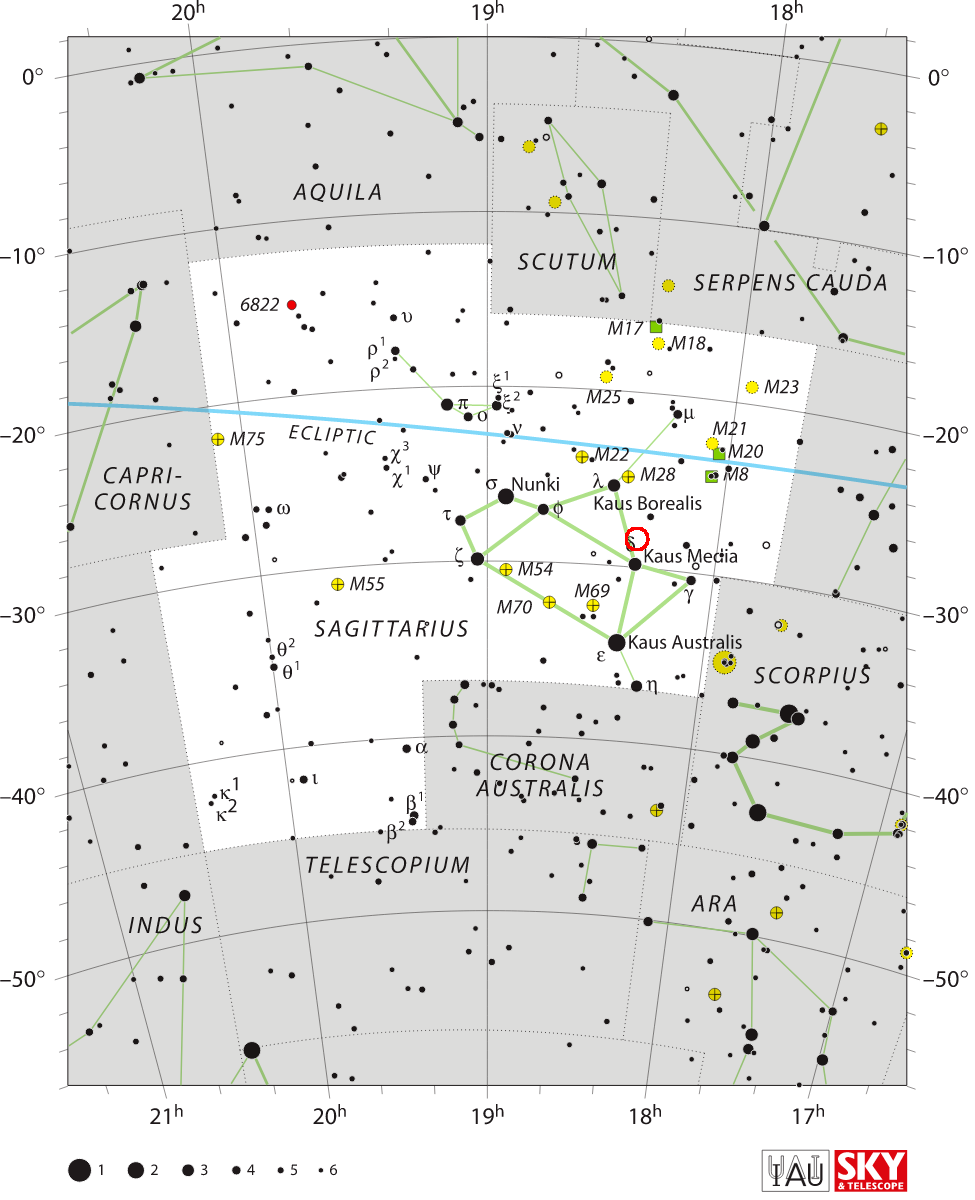
The location of V5856 Sagittarii (circled in red)

All novae are binary stars, with a "donor" star orbiting a white dwarf. The two stars are so close to each other that matter is transferred from the donor to the white dwarf. In the case of V5856 Sagittarii, the absence of a detection of a progenitor in the OGLE images suggests that the donor is a dwarf star.
