= NGC 5603 =

Galaxy in the constellation Boötes

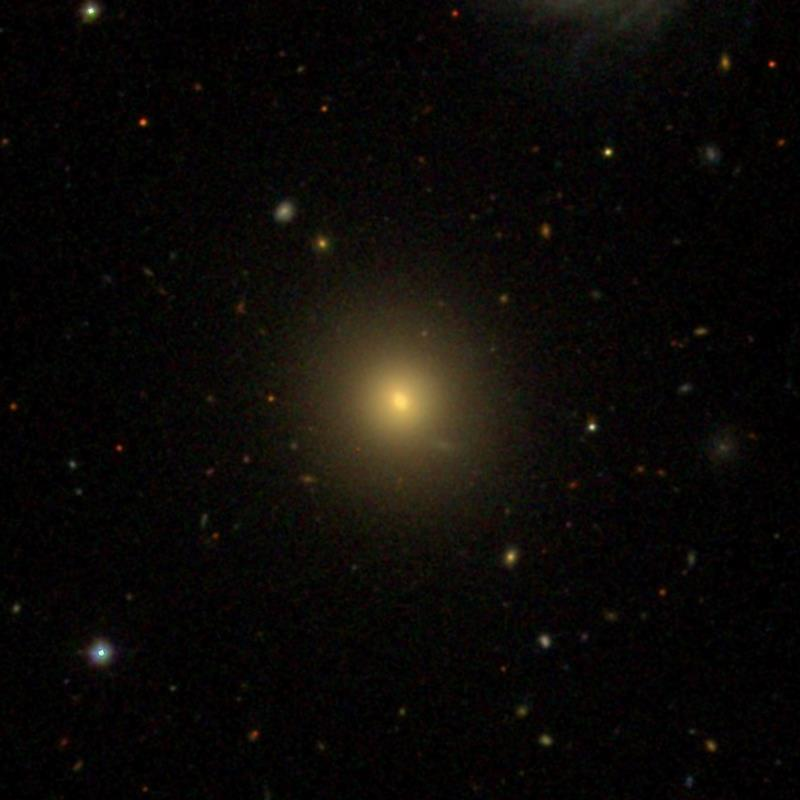
- The galaxy, imaged by the Sloan Digital Sky Survey

Observation data (J2000 epoch)
- Right ascension: 14^{h} 23^{m} 01.527^{s}
- Declination: 40° 22′ 38.684″
- Redshift: 0.01857
- magnitude (J): 10.938
- magnitude (H): 10.239
- magnitude (K): 9.984

Characteristics
- Type: SA C
- References: data

NGC 5603 is a lenticular galaxy in the constellation Boötes. It was discovered by William Herschel on April 29, 1788 and was observed by John Herschel on May 13, 1828.

== NGC 5739 Group ==
According to Abraham Mahtessian, NGC 5603 is part of the seven member NGC 5739 group (also known as [M98j] 234). The other six galaxies are: NGC 5598, NGC 5784, NGC 5696, NGC 5739, NGC 5787, and NGC 5860.
