= TrueImage =

PostScript-compatible interpreter

TrueImage is a PostScript-compatible interpreter (clone) originally developed by Cal Bauer and Bauer Enterprises and sold to Microsoft in 1989. Microsoft subsequently cross-licensed TrueImage to Apple Computer in exchange for a TrueType license. After many delays, Microsoft finally delivered version 1.0 of TrueImage to Apple; Apple announced they would be licensing PostScript Level 2 from Adobe Systems a few months later.

Apple tried to build one product on TrueImage, but no TrueImage products were ever released by the company. However, TrueImage was used in a variety of laser printers, such as Abaton Okidata and LaserMaster into the mid-1990s, with limited success.
