= Bill Paxton (computer scientist) =

American computer scientist

- Born: William Hamilton Paxton
- Died: July 23, 2025
- Known for: Adobe Systems, PostScript, Modules for Experiments in Stellar Astrophysics (MESA)
- Awards: Beatrice M. Tinsley Prize
- Scientific career
- Fields: Computer Science, Astrophysics
- Thesis: A framework for speech understanding (1977)

William Paxton was a computer scientist at the University of California, Santa Barbara. He was one of the founders of Adobe Systems and became one of the original designers and implementors of the PostScript page description language. He is also the creator of the most widely-used open-source software to simulate stars for computational stellar astrophysics research, MESA. In 2021, Paxton was awarded the Beatrice M. Tinsley Prize for developing the MESA software.

Paxton died in July 2025.

== Stanford ==
Paxton received his PhD from Stanford in 1977. He worked with Doug Engelbart at the Stanford Research Institute where the group would build the Online System (NLS) and was there during "The Mother of All Demos" in which he appeared.

== Xerox PARC ==
After leaving Stanford, Paxton would join the Xerox Palo Alto Research Center (PARC) where they were working on emerging technologies, including Ethernet, networked personal computers, bitmap displays, graphical user-interfaces, and laser printers.

== Adobe ==
Paxton joined Adobe in 1983. He built the Type 1 font algorithms for PDF. Paxton and his team received the ACM Software System Award in 1989 for the design of the PostScript language and implementation.

== Kavli Institute for Theoretical Physics ==
In 1990 Paxton retired from Adobe Systems. In the early 2000's, after moving to Santa Barbara, California and taking physics and math coursework at the University of California, Santa Barbara (UCSB), he became an unofficial scholar in residence at the Kavli Institute for Theoretical Physics (KITP) at UCSB, where he started working on the physics of stellar evolution. He is responsible for the EZ stellar evolution program and the creation of the open-source stellar evolution software Modules for Experiments in Stellar Astrophysics (MESA).
