= ASASSN-14li =

Tidal disruption event

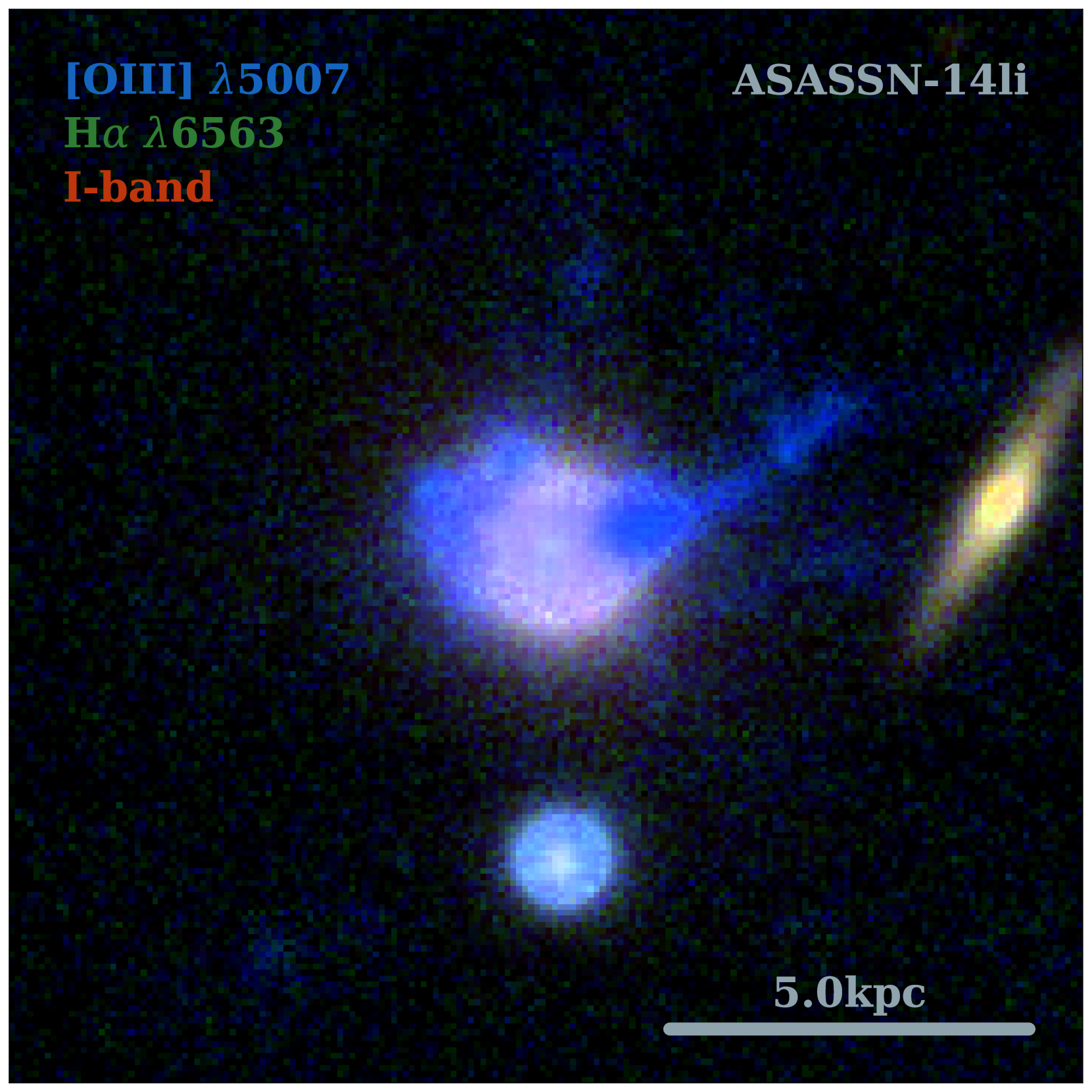
- VLT/MUSE image of the host galaxy, showing an EELR (blue: oxygen)
- Event type: Tidal disruption event
- Date: November 2014
- Constellation: Coma Berenices
- Distance: 290 Mly
- Host: PGC 43234

ASASSN-14li was a tidal disruption event that occurred when a moderately massive star of 3 solar masses and significant CNO processing was tidally disrupted by a supermassive black hole in a galaxy around 290 million light years from Earth. However it could have been a low mass star that has been stripped of its envelope. If the star turns out to be around 3 solar masses, it would be one of the largest stars known to have experienced a tidal disruption event.

The debris from the disrupted star showed relatively high amounts of nitrogen and carbon. These elements were created during the tidal disruption event.

In 2016, a team of researchers used VLT/MUSE to observe PGC 43234, the host galaxy of ASASSN-14li. The team discovered an extended emission-line region (EELR) around the galaxy. Since this discovery it was found that TDEs frequently host EELRs.
