= MESA (astrophysics) =

Open-source astrophysics software

MESA (for Modules for Experiments in Stellar Astrophysics) is a free and open-source software suite for running 1D hydrodynamic simulations of stellar evolution. It was initially developed by Bill Paxton at the Kavli Institute for Theoretical Physics, with the first official release in 2011. In 2025, stewardship was transferred to the Center for Computational Astrophysics at the Flatiron Institute.

Due to its decent performance on consumer laptops and scalability for supercomputers, MESA has seen widespread adoption in the astrophysics community. As of 2026, it has been cited as a simulation tool in over 4000 published papers as indexed by Astrophysics Data System.

== History ==
Bill Paxton began auditing the graduate astrophysics program at UC Santa Barbara in 2000, and took on a research project with Lars Bildsten on binary star evolution. By 2004 Paxton had written the precursor to MESA, a code called EZ (for "Evolve ZAMS") derived from prior work by Peter Eggleton. Paxton began developing MESA in 2005, and published the initial version in 2011.

== Design ==
MESA is written in Fortran 90.

=== User interface ===
MESA has a file-based user interface for input and output, with optional display of live plots. Users configure the stellar physics and graphical output of MESA through Fortran namelist files, with initial parameters frozen at runtime, and dynamic parameters reloaded at every simulation step.

=== Architecture ===
MESA comprises several modules:

- atm (Atmospheres)
- eos (Equation of state), equations-of-states for typical stellar plasma, relativistic plasma, degenerate matter, etc
- net (Reaction networks), including a library of reactions mediated by the weak interaction
- kap (Opacity)
