= ASASSN-19bt =

Tidal disruption event

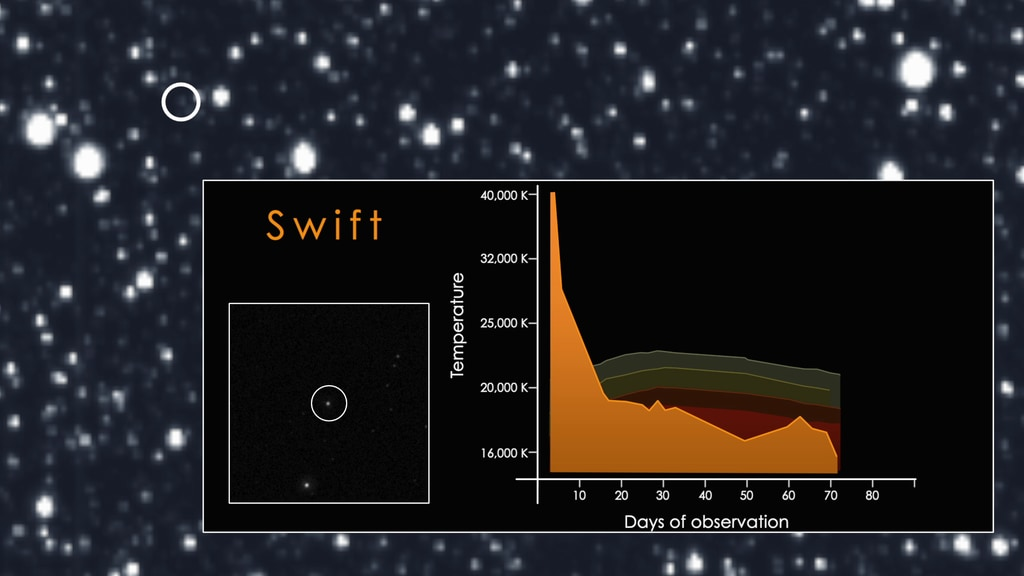
- Object type: Tidal disruption event

Observation data (Epoch J2000)
- Constellation: Volans
- Right ascension: 07^{h} 00^{m} 11.546^{s}
- Declination: −66° 02′ 24.14″
- Redshift: 0.0262
- Related media on Wikimedia Commons

ASASSN-19bt was a tidal disruption event (TDE) known for being the first such event discovered. It was discovered by the All Sky Automated Survey for SuperNovae (ASAS-SN) project, with early-time, detailed observations by the TESS satellite. It was first detected on January 21, 2019, and reached peak brightness on March 4.

The black hole which caused the TDE has a mass of around 6 million suns and is in the 16th magnitude galaxy 2MASX J07001137-6602251 in the constellation Volans at a redshift of 0.0262, around 375 million light years away.

Observations in UV light made with NASA's Neil Gehrels Swift Observatory showed a drop in the temperature of the tidal disruption from around 71,500 to 35,500 degrees Fahrenheit (40,000 to 20,000 degrees Celsius) over a few days. This is the first time such an early temperature drop has been seen in a tidal disruption event. The transient resulting from the tidal disruption event has been cataloged as AT 2019ahk.
