= PostScript =

File format and programming language

- PostScript 3 logo
- Paradigm: Multi-paradigm: concatenative (stack-based), procedural
- Designed by: John Warnock, Chuck Geschke, Doug Brotz, Ed Taft, Bill Paxton
- Developer: Adobe Systems
- First appeared: 1982; 44 years ago
- Stable release: PostScript 3 / 1997; 29 years ago
- Typing discipline: Dynamic, weak

Major implementations
- Adobe PostScript, TrueImage, Ghostscript

Influenced by
- Mesa, Interpress, Lisp, FORTH

Influenced
- PDF

PostScript (file format)
- Filename extension: .ps
- Internet media type: application/postscript
- Uniform Type Identifier (UTI): com.adobe.postscript
- Magic number: %!
- Developed by: Adobe Systems
- Type of format: printing file format
- Extended to: Encapsulated PostScript

PostScript (PS) is a page description language and dynamically typed, stack-based programming language. It is most commonly used in the electronic publishing and desktop publishing realm, but as a Turing complete programming language, it can be used for many other purposes as well. PostScript was created at Adobe Systems by John Warnock, Charles Geschke, Doug Brotz, Ed Taft and Bill Paxton from 1982 to 1984. The most recent version, PostScript 3, was released in 1997.

== History ==
The concepts of the PostScript language were seeded in 1976 by John Gaffney at Evans & Sutherland, a computer graphics company. At that time, Gaffney and John Warnock were developing an interpreter for a large three-dimensional graphics database of New York Harbor.

Concurrently, researchers at Xerox PARC had developed the first laser printer and had recognized the need for a standard means of defining page images. In 1975–76 Bob Sproull and William Newman developed the Press format, which was eventually used in the Xerox Star system to drive laser printers. But Press, a data format rather than a language, lacked flexibility, and PARC mounted the Interpress effort to create a successor.

In 1978, John Gaffney and Martin Newell then at Xerox PARC wrote J & M or JaM (for "John and Martin") which was used for VLSI design and the investigation of type and graphics printing. This work later evolved and expanded into the Interpress language.

Warnock left with Chuck Geschke and founded Adobe Systems in December 1982. They, together with Doug Brotz, Ed Taft and Bill Paxton created a simpler language, similar to Interpress, called PostScript, which went on the market in 1984.

Meanwhile, in the spring of 1983, Steve Jobs came to visit Adobe and was dazzled by PostScript's potential, especially for the new Macintosh computer he was developing at Apple. To John Sculley's frustration, Jobs licensed the PostScript technology from Adobe by offering a $1.5 million advance against PostScript royalties, plus $2.5 million in exchange for 20 percent of Adobe shares. During a series of meetings in 1983, Jobs also repeatedly offered for Apple to buy Adobe outright, but the founders kept turning him down. In December 1983, the two companies finally signed off on the PostScript licensing deal, and Adobe had to shift focus immediately from high-end, high-resolution printing devices to the consumer-oriented Apple LaserWriter laser printer.

At that time, the 300-dpi Canon laser printing engine to be used in LaserWriters was seen as good enough only for proof printing (i.e., for crude rough drafts of material whose final drafts would be sent to professional high-resolution devices), but Jobs presented Adobe with the challenge of making PostScript render high-quality output to such a low-resolution device (which for most consumers would be their only printing device). In response, Warnock and Brotz solved the so-called "appearance problem" of making the stem width of letters scale properly so that they look good at all resolutions. Their breakthrough was so important that Adobe never patented the technology, in order to keep its details concealed as a trade secret. Many years later, Warnock revealed the trade secret in a 2010 lecture, and in 2022, Adobe publicly released an early version of PostScript's original source code from February 1984. Paxton worked on several other related improvements, such as font hinting. This work occurred after February 1984, meaning that Paxton's improvements were not included in the source code release and are still protected as trade secrets. Adobe was also responsible for porting PostScript to the Canon's Motorola 68000 chip.

Apple and Adobe announced the LaserWriter at Apple's annual stockholder meeting on January 23, 1985. It was the first printer to ship with PostScript, sparking the desktop publishing (DTP) revolution in the mid-1980s. The original PostScript royalty was five percent of the list price for each laser printer sold, which was $350 of the original LaserWriter list price of $6,995, and such royalties provided nearly all of Adobe's income during its early years. (Apple later renegotiated the contract to pay a licensing fee based on volume of printers shipped.) The combination of technical merits and widespread availability made PostScript the language of choice for graphical output for printing applications. An interpreter (sometimes referred to as a RIP for Raster Image Processor) for the PostScript language was a common component of laser printers during the 1980s and 1990s.

However, the cost of implementation was high; computers output raw PS code that would be interpreted by the printer into a raster image at the printer's natural resolution. This required high-performance microprocessors and ample memory. The LaserWriter used a 12 MHz Motorola 68000, making it faster than any of the Macintosh computers to which it was attached. By 1987, the cost of licensing PS and fonts from Adobe was $400 to $900 per printer. When the laser printer engines themselves cost over a thousand dollars, the added cost of PS was marginal. But, as printer mechanisms fell in price, the cost of implementing PS became too great a fraction of overall printer cost. In addition, with desktop computers becoming more powerful during the 1990s than their attached printers, it no longer made sense to offload the rasterization work onto the resource-constrained printer. By 2001, few low-end printer models came with onboard support for PostScript, largely due to growing competition from much cheaper non-PostScript inkjet printers, and new software-based methods to render PostScript images on computers, making them suitable for any printer. PDF, a descendant of PostScript, provides one such method, and has largely replaced PostScript as the de facto standard for electronic document distribution.

On high-end printers, PostScript processors remain common, and their use can dramatically reduce the CPU work involved in printing documents, transferring the work of rendering PostScript images from the computer to the printer.

=== PostScript Level 1 ===
The first version of the PostScript language was released to the market in 1984. The qualifier Level 1 was added when Level 2 was introduced.

=== PostScript Level 2 ===
PostScript Level 2 was introduced in 1991, and included several improvements: improved speed and reliability, support for in-Raster Image Processing (RIP) separations, image decompression (for example, JPEG images could be rendered by a PostScript program), support for composite fonts, and the form mechanism for caching reusable content.

=== PostScript 3 ===
PostScript 3 (Adobe dropped the "level" terminology in favor of simple versioning) came at the end of 1997, and along with many new dictionary-based versions of older operators, introduced better color handling and new filters (which allow in-program compression/decompression, program chunking, and advanced error handling).

PostScript 3 was significant in terms of replacing the existing proprietary color electronic prepress systems, then widely used for magazine production, through the introduction of smooth shading operations with up to 4096 shades of grey (rather than the 256 available in PostScript Level 2), as well as DeviceN, a color space that allowed the addition of additional ink colors (called spot colors) into composite color pages.

== Use in printing ==
=== Before PostScript ===
Prior to the introduction of Interpress and PostScript, printers were designed to print character output given the text—typically in ASCII—as input. There were a number of technologies for this task, but most shared the property that the glyphs were physically difficult to change, as they were stamped onto typewriter keys, bands of metal, or optical plates.

This changed to some degree with the increasing popularity of dot matrix printers. The characters on these systems were drawn as a series of dots, as defined by a font table inside the printer. As they grew in sophistication, dot matrix printers started including several built-in fonts from which the user could select, and some models allowed users to upload their own custom glyphs into the printer.

Dot matrix printers also introduced the ability to print raster graphics. The graphics were interpreted by the computer and sent as a series of dots to the printer using a series of escape sequences. These printer control languages varied from printer to printer, requiring program authors to create numerous drivers.

Vector graphics printing was left to special-purpose devices, called plotters. Almost all plotters shared a common command language, HPGL, but were of limited use for anything other than printing graphics. In addition, they tended to be expensive and slow, and thus rare.

=== PostScript printing ===
Laser printers combine the best features of both printers and plotters. Like plotters, laser printers offer high-quality line art, and like dot-matrix printers, they are able to generate pages of text and raster graphics. Unlike either printers or plotters, a laser printer makes it possible to position high-quality graphics and text on the same page. PostScript made it possible to fully exploit these characteristics by offering a single control language that could be used on any brand of printer.

PostScript went beyond the typical printer control language and was a complete programming language of its own. Many applications can transform a document into a PostScript program, the execution of which results in the original document. This program can be sent to an interpreter in a printer, which results in a printed document, or to one inside another application, which will display the document on-screen. Since the document-program is the same regardless of its destination, it is called device-independent.

PostScript is noteworthy for implementing on-the-fly rasterization in which everything, even text, is specified in terms of straight lines and cubic Bézier curves (previously found only in CAD applications), which allows arbitrary scaling, rotating and other transformations. When the PostScript program is interpreted, the interpreter converts these instructions into the dots needed to form the output. For this reason, PostScript interpreters are occasionally called PostScript raster image processors, or RIPs.

=== Font handling ===
Almost as complex as PostScript itself is its handling of fonts. The font system uses the PS graphics primitives to draw glyphs as curves, which can then be rendered at any resolution. A number of typographic issues had to be considered with this approach.

One issue is that fonts do not scale linearly at small sizes and features of the glyphs will become proportionally too large or small and start to look displeasing. PostScript avoided this problem with the inclusion of font hinting, in which additional information is provided in horizontal or vertical bands to help identify the features in each letter that are important for the rasterizer to maintain. The result was significantly better-looking fonts even at low resolution. It had formerly been believed that hand-tuned bitmap fonts were required for this task.

At the time, the technology for including these hints in fonts was carefully guarded, and the hinted fonts were compressed and encrypted into what Adobe called a Type 1 Font (also known as PostScript Type 1 Font, PS1, T1 or Adobe Type 1). Type 1 was effectively a simplification of the PS system to store outline information only, as opposed to being a complete language (PDF is similar in this regard). Adobe would then sell licenses to the Type 1 technology to those wanting to add hints to their own fonts. Those who did not license the technology were left with the Type 3 Font (also known as PostScript Type 3 Font, PS3 or T3). Type 3 fonts allowed for all the sophistication of the PostScript language, but without the standardized approach to hinting.

The Type 2 font format was designed to be used with Compact Font Format (CFF) charstrings, and was implemented to reduce the overall font file size. The CFF/Type2 format later became the basis for handling PostScript outlines in OpenType fonts.

The CID-keyed font format was also designed, to solve the problems in the OCF/Type 0 fonts, for addressing the complex Asian-language (CJK) encoding and very large character set issues. The CID-keyed font format can be used with the Type 1 font format for standard CID-keyed fonts, or Type 2 for CID-keyed OpenType fonts.

To compete with Adobe's system, Apple designed their own system, TrueType, around 1991. Immediately following the announcement of TrueType, Adobe published the specification for the Type 1 font format. Retail tools such as Altsys Fontographer (acquired by Macromedia in January 1995, owned by FontLab since May 2005) added the ability to create Type 1 fonts. Since then, many free Type 1 fonts have been released; for instance, the fonts used with the TeX typesetting system are available in this format.

In the early 1990s, there were several other systems for storing outline-based fonts, developed by Bitstream and Metafont for instance, but none included a general-purpose printing solution and they were therefore not widely used.

In the late 1990s, Adobe joined Microsoft in developing OpenType, essentially a functional superset of the Type 1 and TrueType formats. When printed to a PostScript output device, the unneeded parts of the OpenType font are omitted, and what is sent to the device by the driver is the same as it would be for a TrueType or Type 1 font, depending on which kind of outlines were present in the OpenType font.

Adobe supported Type 1 fonts in its products until January 2023, when it fully removed support in favor of OpenType fonts.

=== Other implementations ===
Both computer printers and high-end typesetters such as Linotronic implemented PostScript. In the 1980s, Adobe drew most of its revenue from the licensing fees for implementations, known as a raster image processor or RIP. As a number of new RISC-based platforms became available in the mid-1980s, some found Adobe's support of the new machines to be lacking.

This and issues of cost led to third-party implementations of PostScript becoming common, particularly in low-cost printers (where the licensing fee was the sticking point) or in high-end typesetting equipment (where the quest for speed demanded support for new platforms faster than Adobe could provide). At one point, Microsoft licensed to Apple a PostScript-compatible interpreter it had bought called TrueImage, and Apple licensed to Microsoft its new font format, TrueType. Apple ended up reaching an accord with Adobe and licensed genuine PostScript for its printers, but TrueType became the standard outline font technology for both Windows and the Macintosh.

Today, third-party PostScript-compatible interpreters are widely used in printers and multifunction peripherals (MFPs). For example, CSR plc's IPS PS3 interpreter, formerly known as PhoenixPage, is standard in many printers and MFPs, including those developed by Hewlett-Packard and sold under the LaserJet and Color LaserJet lines. Other third-party PostScript solutions used by print and MFP manufacturers include Jaws and the Harlequin RIP, both by Global Graphics. A free software version, with several other applications, is Ghostscript. Several compatible interpreters are listed on the Undocumented Printing Wiki.

Some basic, inexpensive laser printers do not support PostScript, instead coming with drivers that simply rasterize the platform's native graphics formats rather than converting them to PostScript first. When PostScript support is needed for such a printer, Ghostscript can be used. There are also a number of commercial PostScript interpreters, such as TeleType Co.'s T-Script or Brother's BR-Script3.

== Use as a display system ==
PostScript became commercially successful due to the introduction of the graphical user interface (GUI), allowing designers to directly lay out pages for eventual output on laser printers. However, the GUIs' own graphics systems were generally much less sophisticated than PostScript; Apple's QuickDraw, for instance, supported only basic lines and arcs, not the complex B-splines and advanced region filling options of PostScript. In order to take full advantage of PostScript printing, applications on the computers had to re-implement those features using the host platform's own graphics system. This led to numerous issues where the on-screen layout would not exactly match the printed output, due to differences in the implementation of these features.

As computer power grew, it became possible to host the PS system in the computer rather than the printer. This led to the natural evolution of PS from a printing system to one that could also be used as the host's own graphics language. There were numerous advantages to this approach; not only did it help eliminate the possibility of different output on screen and printer, but it also provided a powerful graphics system for the computer, and allowed the printers to be "dumb" at a time when the cost of the laser engines was falling. In a production setting, using PostScript as a display system meant that the host computer could render low-resolution to the screen, higher resolution to the printer, or simply send the PS code to a smart printer for offboard printing.

However, PostScript was written with printing in mind, and had numerous features that made it unsuitable for direct use in an interactive display system. In particular, PS was based on the idea of collecting up PS commands until the showpage command was seen, at which point all of the commands read up to that point were interpreted and output. In an interactive system, this was clearly not appropriate, nor did PS have any sort of interactivity built in; for example, supporting hit detection for mouse interactivity obviously did not apply when PS was being used on a printer.

When Steve Jobs left Apple and started NeXT, he pitched Adobe on the idea of using PS as the display system for his new workstation computers. The result was Display PostScript, or DPS. DPS added basic functionality to improve performance by changing many string lookups into 32 bit integers, adding support for direct output with every command, and adding functions to allow the GUI to inspect the diagram. Additionally, a set of "bindings" was provided to allow PS code to be called directly from the C programming language. NeXT used these bindings in their NeXTStep system to provide an object oriented graphics system. Although DPS was written in conjunction with NeXT, Adobe sold it commercially and it was a common feature of most Unix workstations in the 1990s.

Sun Microsystems took another approach, creating NeWS. Instead of DPS's concept of allowing PS to interact with C programs, NeWS instead extended PS into a language suitable for running the entire GUI of a computer. Sun added a number of new commands for timers, mouse control, interrupts and other systems needed for interactivity, and added data structures and language elements to allow it to be completely object oriented internally. A complete GUI, three in fact, were written in NeWS and provided for a time on their workstations. However, the ongoing efforts to standardize the X11 system led to its introduction and widespread use on Sun systems, and NeWS never became widely used.

== Portable Document Format ==
PDF and PostScript share the same imaging model, and both formats are, mostly, mutually convertible to each other. However PostScript, the earlier format, lacks transparency: its native object model paints completely opaque. Except this, both formats produce the same result when printed. But PDF lacks the general-purpose programming language framework of the PostScript language. A PDF document is a static data structure made for efficient access and embeds navigational information suitable for interactive viewing.

== The language ==
PostScript is a Turing-complete programming language, belonging to the concatenative group of programming languages. It is an interpreted, stack-based language similar to Forth, with dynamic typing, data structures inspired by those found in Lisp, scoped memory and, since language level 2, garbage collection. The language syntax uses reverse Polish notation, which makes the order of operations unambiguous, but reading a program requires some practice, because one has to keep the layout of the stack in mind. Most operators (what other languages term functions) take their arguments from the stack, and place their results onto the stack. Literals (for example, numbers) have the effect of placing a copy of themselves on the stack. Sophisticated data structures can be built on the array and dictionary types, but cannot be declared to the type system, which sees them all only as arrays and dictionaries, so any further typing discipline to be applied to such user-defined "types" is left to the code that implements them.

The character "%" is used to introduce comments in PostScript programs. As a convention, every PostScript program should start with the characters "%!PS" as an interpreter directive so that all devices will properly interpret it as PostScript.

PostScript programs are typically divided into two parts, conventionally called the prolog and the script. The prolog contains procedures and is written by a programmer. The script passes data to those procedures. The script is often generated automatically, using a programming language other than PostScript.

=== "Hello world" ===
A Hello World program, the customary way to show a small example of a complete program in a given language, might look like this in PostScript (level 2):

 %!PS
 /Courier             % name the desired font
 20 selectfont        % choose the size in points and establish 
                      % the font as the current one
 72 500 moveto        % position the current point at 
                      % coordinates 72, 500 (the origin is at the 
                      % lower-left corner of the page)
 (Hello world!) show  % paint the text in parentheses
 showpage             % print all on the page

or if the output device has a console

 %!PS
 (Hello world!) =

=== Units of length ===
PostScript uses the point as its unit of length. However, unlike some of the other versions of the point, PostScript uses exactly 72 points to the inch. Thus:

1 point = 1/72 inch = 25.4/72 mm = 127/360 mm = 352.777… micrometers

For example, in order to draw a vertical line of 4 cm length, it is sufficient to type:

0 0 moveto 
0 113.385827 rlineto stroke

More readably and idiomatically, one might use the following equivalent, which demonstrates a simple procedure definition and the use of the mathematical operators mul and div:

/cm {72 mul 2.54 div} def               % 1 inch = 2.54 cm exactly
 0 0 moveto
 0 4 cm rlineto stroke

(Technically, most printers have a construction-implied unprintable margin around the physical borders of the sheet, and the 0 0 coordinates are calibrated to its corner, so you might have to use a different starting point to actually see something.)

Most implementations of PostScript use single-precision reals (24-bit mantissa), so it is not meaningful to use more than 9 decimal digits to specify a real number, and performing calculations may produce unacceptable round-off errors.

== Software ==
Software which can be used to render PostScript documents:

- Adobe Acrobat Distiller
- Ghostscript
- pstoedit

== See also ==
- Adobe StandardEncoding (PostScript character set)
- Document Structuring Conventions
- Encapsulated PostScript (EPS)
- Forth (programming language)
- PostScript fonts
- PostScript Printer Description (PPD)
- Printer Command Language (PCL)
