= Christopher Kochanek =

American astronomer

Christopher Sharpe Kochanek is an American astronomer. He works in the fields of cosmology, gravitational lensing, and supernovae. Kochanek currently is an Ohio Eminent Scholar at Ohio State University as well as an Elected Fellow of the American Association for the Advancement of Science.

In 2020, he was the recipient of the Beatrice M. Tinsley Prize with Krzysztof Stanek for their leadership of the All-Sky Automated Survey for Supernovae ASAS-SN), in addition to the Dannie Heineman Prize for Astrophysics.

Kochanek is also working on the problem of cepheid variable analyses as a standard candle in measuring the expansion of the universe using the Hubble Constant (H0), according to Sky & Telescope magazine (October 1997).
