= NGC 2814 =

Galaxy in the constellation Ursa Major

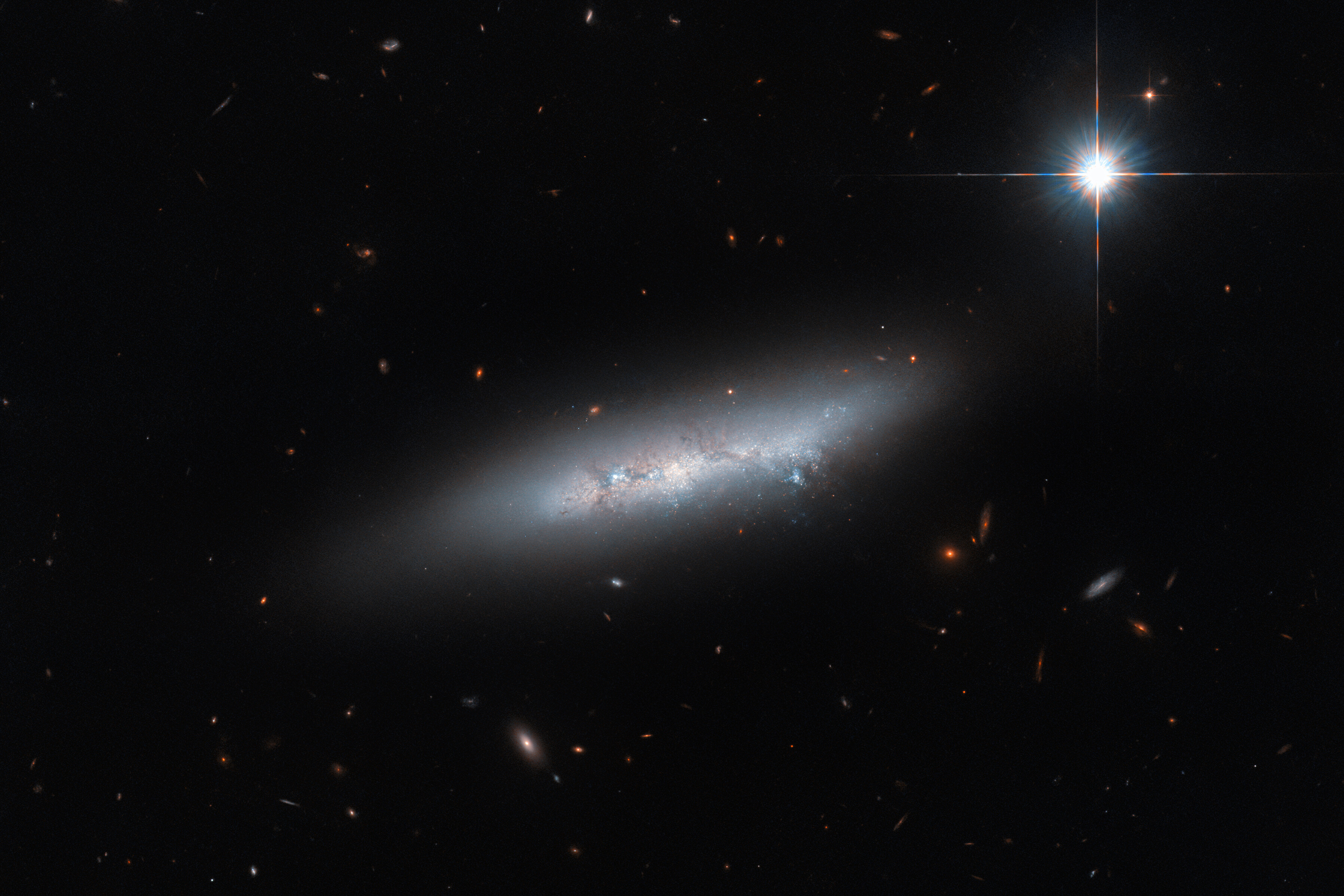
- NGC 2814 imaged by the Hubble Space Telescope

Observation data (J2000 epoch)
- Constellation: Ursa Major
- Right ascension: 09^{h} 21^{m} 11.4079^{s}
- Declination: +64° 15′ 12.499″
- Redshift: 0.00531±0.0000130
- Heliocentric radial velocity: 1,592±4 km/s
- Distance: 81.4 ± 5.7 Mly (24.97 ± 1.75 Mpc)
- Apparent magnitude (V): 13.7

Characteristics
- Type: Sb
- Size: ~49,400 ly (15.16 kpc) (estimated)
- Apparent size (V): 1.1′ × 0.3′

Other designations
- HOLM 124C, IRAS 09170+6428, 2MASX J09211152+6415117, UGC 4952, MCG +11-12-004, PGC 26469, CGCG 312-003

NGC 2814 is a small spiral galaxy in the constellation Ursa Major. Its velocity relative to the cosmic microwave background is 1,693 ± 8 km/s, which corresponds to a Hubble distance of 81.4 ± 5.7 Mly (24.97 ± 1.75 Mpc). However, one non-redshift measurement gives a farther distance of 88 Mly (27.1 Mpc). It was discovered by German-British astronomer William Herschel on 3 April 1791.

NGC 2814 has a luminosity class of II.

== Holmberg 124 ==
NGC 2814 has three galactic neighbours: the edge–on spiral galaxy NGC 2820, the irregular galaxy IC 2458, and the face-on spiral galaxy NGC 2805. Collectively, the four galaxies make up the galaxy group known as Holmberg 124.

== Supernova ==
One supernova has been observed in NGC 2814: SN 2020mmz (Type II, mag. 17.0528) was discovered by the Zwicky Transient Facility on 13 June 2020.

== See also ==
- List of NGC objects
- List of NGC objects (2001–3000)
