= V407 Lupi =

Nova that occurred in 2016

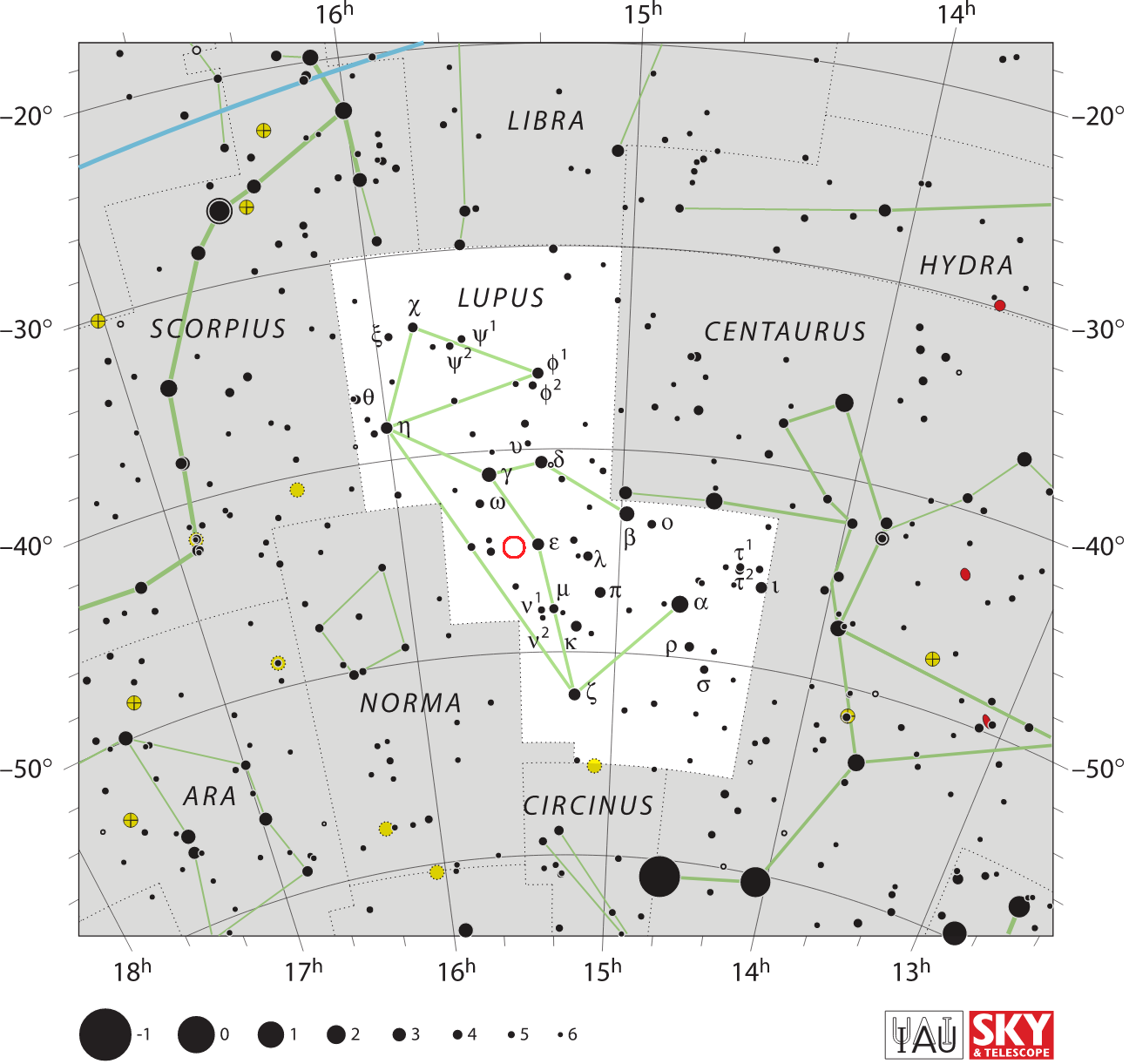
- Location of V407 Lupi (circled in red)

Observation data Epoch J2000.0 Equinox J2000.0 (ICRS)
- Constellation: Lupus
- Right ascension: 15^{h} 29^{m} 01.820^{s}
- Declination: −44° 49′ 40.89″
- Apparent magnitude (V): 5.6 – 14.8

Characteristics
- Variable type: Nova

Other designations
- Nova Lupi 2016, V407 Lup, PNV J15290182-4449409, ASASSN -16kt

Database references
| SIMBAD | data |

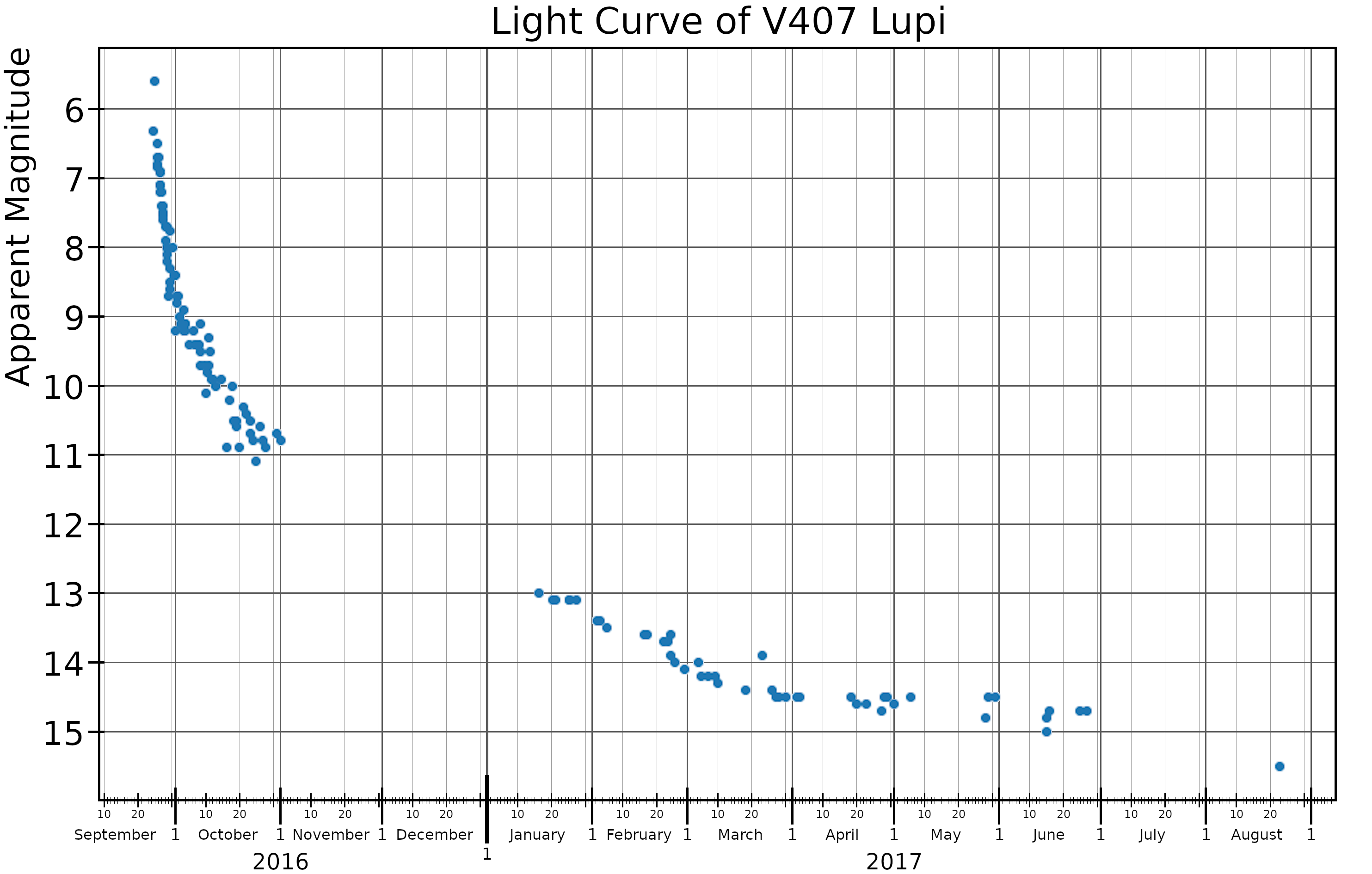
The light curve of V407 Lupi, plotted from AAVSO data

V407 Lupi, also known as Nova Lupi 2016, was a bright nova in the constellation Lupus discovered by All Sky Automated Survey for SuperNovae (ASAS-SN) on 24 September 2016. At the time of its discovery, it had an apparent visual magnitude of 9.1. The ASAS-SN team reported that no object at the nova's location brighter than magnitude 17.5 was seen on images taken four days earlier. Wildly incorrect coordinates (in error by many degrees) were published in the announcement telegram, but corrected in a subsequent telegram. It reached a peak brightness of magnitude 5.6, faintly visible to the naked eye, on 25 September 2016.

V407 Lupi declined from its peak brightness very quickly, fading by 2 magnitudes in less than three days. That is one of the most rapid declines in brightness ever seen in a nova. It is therefore classified as a "very fast" nova in the classification scheme of Cecilia Payne-Gaposchkin.

All novae are binary stars, with a "donor" star orbiting a white dwarf. The two stars are so close to each other that matter is transferred from the donor to the white dwarf. Observations by the satellite TESS detected a variation in the light curve of V407 Lupi indicating an orbital period for the binary system of 3.513 days; it was previously thought to be 3.573 hours, but this has since been disproven. A second periodicity in the light curve was also detected by the Chandra X-ray Observatory and has a period of 591.27465 seconds (9.8545775 min), which appears to be the rotation period of the white dwarf. The very rapid decline from peak brightness indicates that the mass of the white dwarf is ≥ 1.25 M_{☉}, not far below the Chandrasekhar limit for white dwarf masses. The system is probably an intermediate polar nova.

== See also ==
List of novae in the Milky Way galaxy
