= Krzysztof Stanek =

Polish astronomer

- Born: Sandomierz, Poland
- Education: PhD (1996)
- Alma mater: Princeton University
- Awards: Beatrice M. Tinsley Prize (2020)
- Scientific career
- Fields: Astrophysics
- Institutions: Ohio State University

Krzysztof Stanek (born 1968) is a Polish observational astrophysicist and Professor and University Distinguished Scholar at Ohio State University. He was named a University Distinguished Scholar in 2018. His research focus is on the explosive deaths of massive stars.

In 2022, Stanek was awarded a Guggenheim Fellowship. He won the Beatrice M. Tinsley Prize along with Christopher Kochanek in 2020 for their work on the All-Sky Automated Survey for Supernovae (ASAS-SN) project. He is a Fellow of the American Association for the Advancement of Science. He has also been the recipient of a Harvard-Smithsonian CfA Postdoctoral Fellowship, the Polish Astronomical Society Young Astronomer Award and a Hubble Postdoctoral Fellowship.

== Selected articles ==
- Stanek, K. Z.; Gnedin, O. Y.; Beacom, J. F.; Gould, A. P.; Johnson, J. A.; Kollmeier, J. A.; Modjaz, M.; Pinsonneault, M. H.; Pogge, R.; Weinberg, D. H. (2006). "Protecting Life in the Milky Way: Metals Keep the GRBs Away". Acta Astronomica. 56: 333. arXiv:astro-ph/0604113. Bibcode:2006AcA....56..333S.
- Stanek, K. Z.; Matheson, T.; Garnavich, P. M.; Martini, P.; Berlind, P.; Caldwell, N.; Challis, P.; Brown, W. R.; Schild, R.; Krisciunas, K.; Calkins, M. L.; Lee, J. C.; Hathi, N.; Jansen, R. A.; Windhorst, R.; Echevarria, L.; Eisenstein, D. J.; Pindor, B.; Olszewski, E. W.; Harding, P.; Holland, S. T.; Bersier, D. (June 6, 2003). "Spectroscopic Discovery of the Supernova 2003dh Associated with GRB 030329". The Astrophysical Journal. 591 (1): L17–L20. arXiv:astro-ph/0304173. Bibcode:2003ApJ...591L..17S. doi:10.1086/376976. ISSN 0004-637X. S2CID 2561943.
- Stanek, K. Z.; Garnavich, P. M.; Kaluzny, J.; Pych, W.; Thompson, I. (September 1, 1999). "BVRI Observations of the Optical Afterglow of GRB 990510". The Astrophysical Journal. 522 (1): L39–L42. arXiv:astro-ph/9905304. Bibcode:1999ApJ...522L..39S. doi:10.1086/312219. ISSN 0004-637X. S2CID 118267135.
- Stanek, K. Z.; Garnavich, P. M. (August 20, 1998). "Distance to M31 with the Hubble Space Telescope and Hipparcos Red Clump Stars". The Astrophysical Journal. 503 (2): L131–L134. arXiv:astro-ph/9802121. Bibcode:1998ApJ...503L.131S. doi:10.1086/311539. ISSN 0004-637X. S2CID 6383832.

== Books ==
- Humphreys, Roberta M.; Stanek, Krzysztof Z. (2005). The fate of the most massive stars : proceedings of a meeting held at Jackson Lake Lodge, Grand Teton National Park, Wyoming, USA 23–28 May 2004. San Francisco: Astronomical Society of the Pacific. ISBN 1-58381-195-8. OCLC 61853460.
- Paczyński, Bohdan; Stanek, Krzysztof Z. (2009). The variable universe : a celebration of Bohdan Paczyński : proceedings of a symposium held at Princeton University, Princeton, New Jersey, USA, 29–30 September 2007. San Francisco, Calif.: Astronomical Society of the Pacific. ISBN 978-1-58381-682-0. OCLC 317524941.
