= AT 2024tvd =

Tidal disruption event

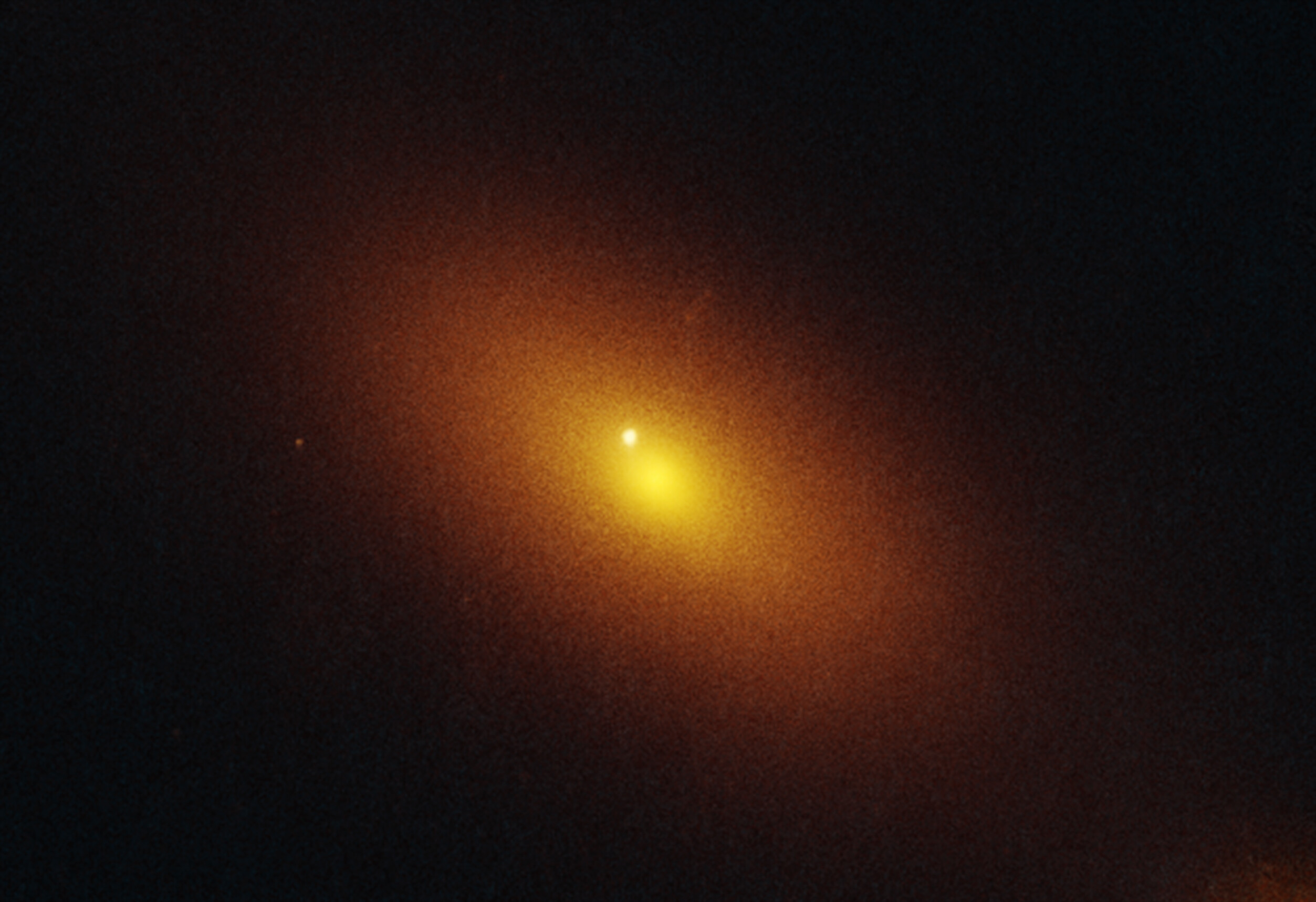
- Hubble Space Telescope image of AT 2024tvd
- Event type: Tidal disruption event
- Date: 25 August 2024
- Instrument: Zwicky Transient Facility
- Constellation: Hercules
- Right ascension: 17^{h} 10^{m} 42.58^{s}
- Declination: +28° 50′ 15.13″
- Epoch: J2000
- Distance: 600 Mly
- Redshift: 0.044938

AT 2024tvd is a tidal disruption event (TDE) discovered in August 2024, notable as the first optically selected TDE occurring outside the nucleus of its host galaxy, approximately 0.8 kiloparsecs (about 2,600 light-years) from the galactic center. This offset position suggests the involvement of a wandering or recoiling supermassive black hole (SMBH), potentially resulting from a minor galaxy merger. The event is located in the constellation Hercules at a redshift of z = 0.044938, corresponding to a comoving distance of roughly 600 million light-years.

== Discovery and Characteristics ==
AT 2024tvd was discovered on August 25, 2024, by the Zwicky Transient Facility (ZTF) at Palomar Observatory. Initial optical spectra showed broad hydrogen and helium emission lines characteristic of TDEs, with no evidence of active galactic nucleus activity.

Follow-up observations, including those from the James Webb Space Telescope (JWST) and Keck Observatory, confirmed its off-nuclear location and classified it as a TDE around an intermediate-mass black hole.

The radio emission is particularly remarkable, showing double-peaked light curves with rapid rise and decay, the fastest evolution recorded for any TDE. Observations were conducted with the Very Large Array (VLA), ALMA, and other radio telescopes.
