= Charles R. Alcock =

British-New Zealand astronomer

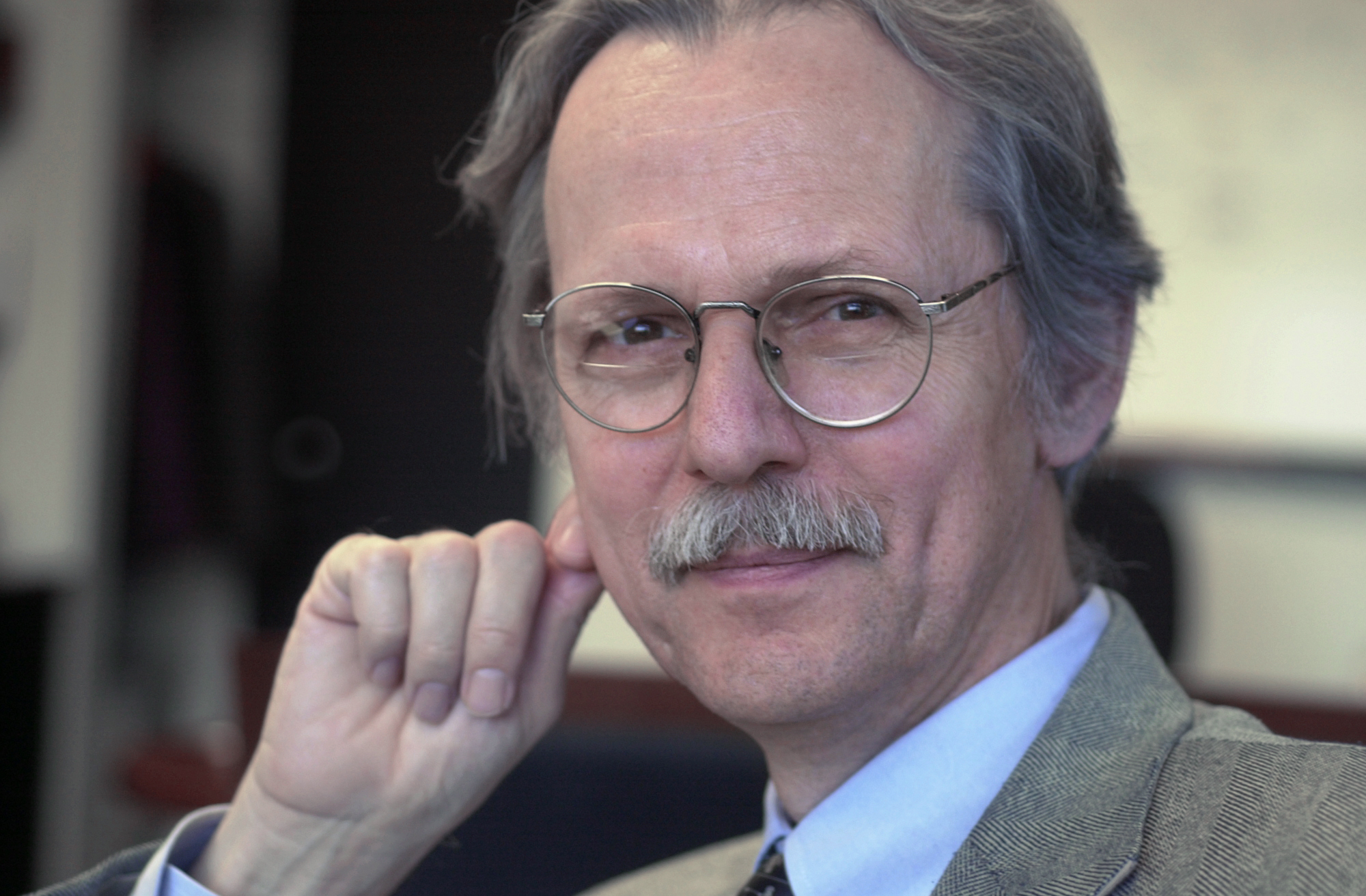
- Alcock in 2004
- Born: Charles Roger Alcock; 15 June 1951 (age 75); Windsor, England
- Education: California Institute of Technology
- Known for: Massive compact halo objects
- Awards: Ernest Orlando Lawrence Award (1996); Beatrice M. Tinsley Prize (2000)
- Scientific career
- Fields: Astrophysics
- Institutions: Center for Astrophysics | Harvard & Smithsonian
- Notable students: Alyssa A. Goodman

Charles Roger Alcock (born 15 June 1951) is a British-New Zealand astronomer. He was the director of the Center for Astrophysics | Harvard & Smithsonian in Cambridge, Massachusetts from 2004 to 2022.

== Career ==
Born in Windsor, Berkshire, England, Alcock attended Westlake Boys High School in the North Shore of Auckland from 1965 to 1968. Alcock earned his PhD in astronomy and physics from the California Institute of Technology in 1977. He began his career as long-term member at the Institute for Advanced Study in Princeton, New Jersey (1977–1981). He was associate professor of physics at the Massachusetts Institute of Technology (1981–1986) before joining Lawrence Livermore National Laboratory (1986–2000), where he directed the Institute of Geophysics and Planetary Physics.

Alcock was previously the Reese W. Flower Professor of Astronomy at the University of Pennsylvania. His primary research interests are massive compact halo objects, comets and asteroids. He is the principal investigator for the Taiwan American Occultation Survey, a project aimed at taking a census of the Solar System's population of Kuiper Belt objects (objects located beyond the orbit of Neptune).

In 2001, Alcock was elected to the United States National Academy of Sciences. He received the 2000 Beatrice M. Tinsley Prize from the American Astronomical Society and the 1996 E.O. Lawrence Award in physics. Both awards recognized his pioneering work as principal investigator on the major U.S. project to search for massive compact halo objects and estimate their contribution to the dark matter component of the Milky Way's galactic halo. He was elected a Fellow of the American Academy of Arts and Sciences in 2006.

Alcock joined the Center for Astrophysics in August 2004 and was director until January 2022. As director, he oversaw an annual federal budget of $111 million, and a staff of approximately 540 Smithsonian employees (as well as visitors, fellows and students) and 130 Harvard faculty, employees, visiting scientists and graduate students.
