= Robert Williams (astronomer) =

American astronomer (born 1940)

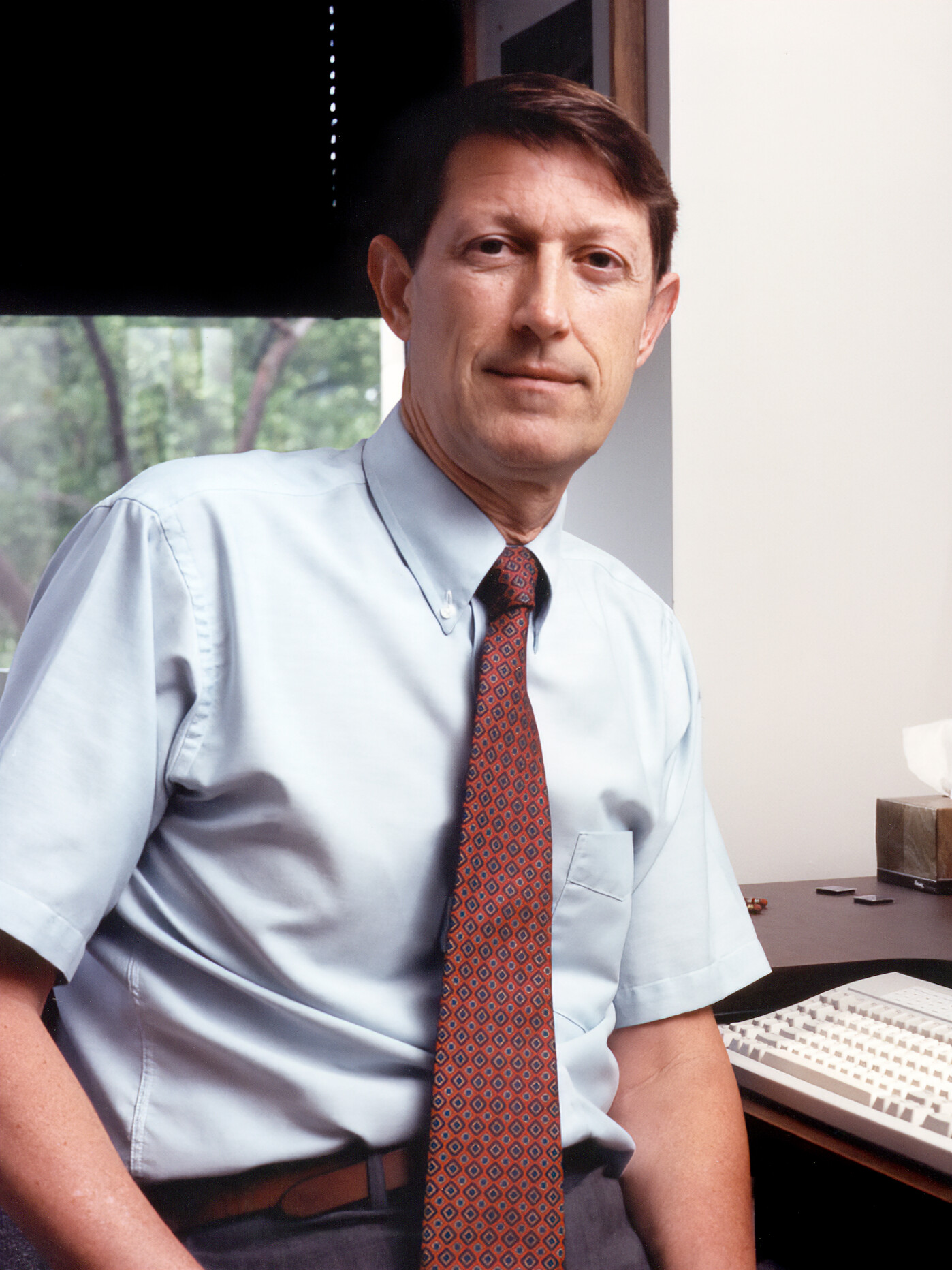
- Williams in 1986
- Born: Robert Eugene Williams; October 14, 1940 (age 85); Dunsmuir, California, U.S.
- Education: University of California, Berkeley (B.S.); University of Wisconsin–Madison (Ph.D.)
- Awards: Beatrice M. Tinsley Prize (1998); NASA Distinguished Public Service Medal (1999); Karl Schwarzschild Medal (2016)
- Scientific career
- Fields: Astronomy; Spectroscopy
- Workplaces: University of Arizona; Cerro Tololo Inter-American Observatory; Space Telescope Science Institute
- Thesis: The Ionization and Temperature Equilibrium of a Gas Excited by Optical Synchrotron Radiation (1965)
- Doctoral advisor: Donald E. Osterbrock
- Website: stsci.edu/~wms

Robert Eugene Williams (October 14, 1940) is an American astronomer who served as the director of the Space Telescope Science Institute (STScI) from 1993 to 1998, and the president of the International Astronomical Union (IAU) from 2009 to 2012. Prior to his work at STScI, he was a professor of astronomy at the University of Arizona in Tucson for 18 years and the director of Cerro Tololo Inter-American Observatory from 1986 to 1993.

== Education ==
Williams studied at the University of California, Berkeley receiving a bachelor of science degree in 1962. He completed a doctorate at the University of Wisconsin–Madison in 1965 with a thesis titled The Ionization and Temperature Equilibrium of a Gas Excited by Optical Synchrotron Radiation. His doctoral advisor was Donald Edward Osterbrock.

== Career ==
After receiving his doctorate in 1965 Williams was employed at the University of Arizona until 1983. From 1985 to 1993 he served as director of the Cerro Tololo Inter-American Observatory in Chile, and from 1993 to 1998 he was director of STSci.

As the director of STScI, he decided to devote a substantial fraction of his director's discretionary time on the Hubble Space Telescope in 1995 to the study of distant galaxies. This historic project resulted in the Hubble Deep Field, a landmark image showing in remarkable detail the structure of galaxies in the early universe. For his leadership of this project, he was awarded the 1998 Beatrice M. Tinsley Prize, the NASA Distinguished Public Service Medal in 1999, and the 2016 Karl Schwarzschild Medal.

A member of the American Academy of Arts & Sciences, Williams' research specialties cover nebulae, novae, and emission-line spectroscopy and analysis. He is an advocate for science education and has lectured internationally on the discoveries of the Hubble Space Telescope. In 1996, Williams made the controversial decision to offer the director's discretionary time on the Hubble Space Telescope to two competing teams using distant supernovae to determine the universe's expansion rate accurately. The two teams independently found that the universe's expansion was accelerating due to a previously unknown energy source. The leaders of the two teams were awarded the 2011 Nobel Prize in Physics for the discovery.

In 2015 Williams retired and was appointed emeritus professor of STScI.

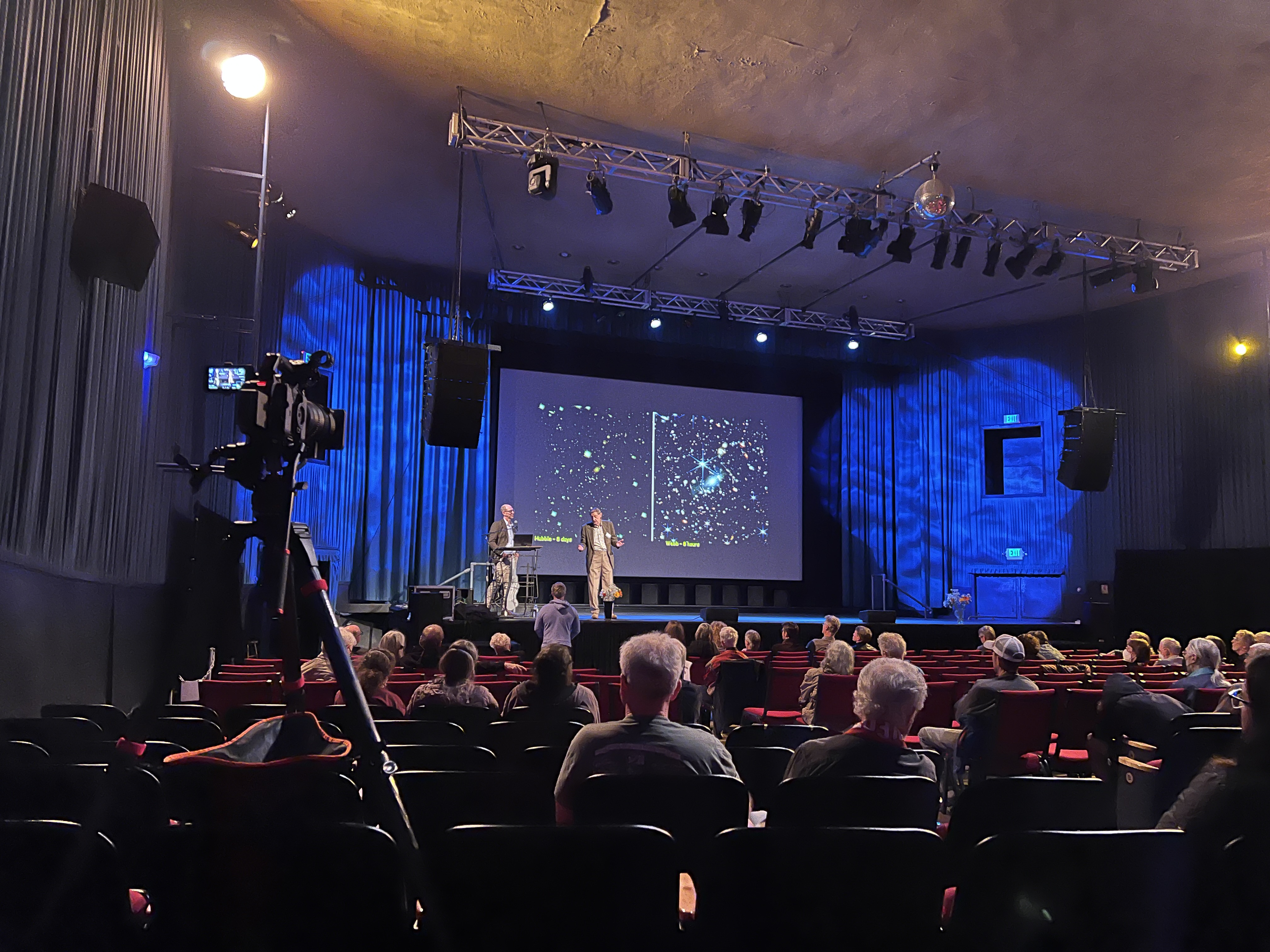
March 2025 - Bot Williams lecture on 30th anniversary of the Hubble Deep Field image
