= Tidal disruption event =

Pulling apart of a star by tidal forces

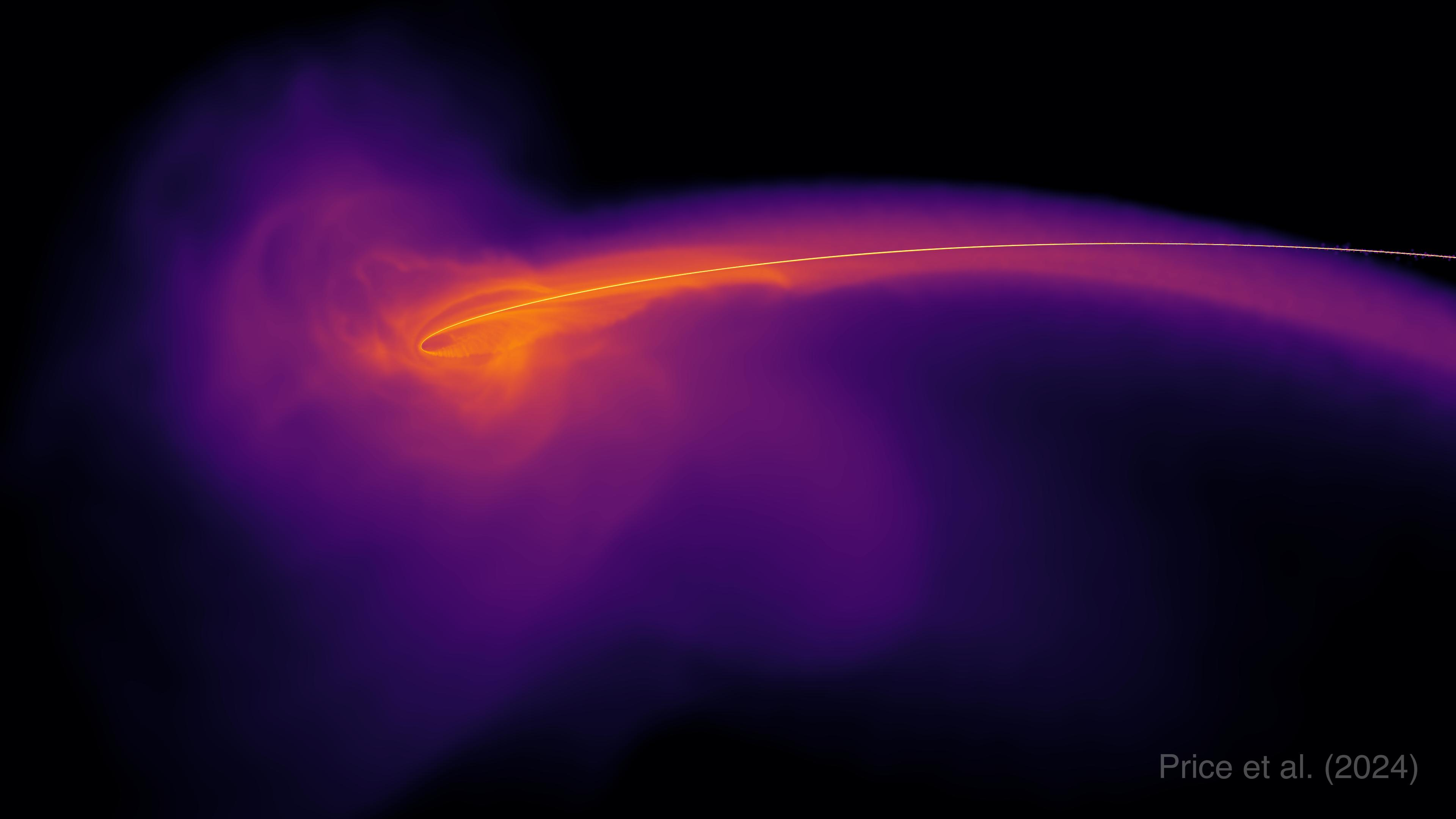
Simulation of a star being disrupted by a supermassive black hole during a tidal disruption event.

A tidal disruption event (TDE) is a transient astronomical source produced when a star passes so close to a supermassive black hole (SMBH) that it is pulled apart by the black hole's tidal force. The star undergoes spaghettification, producing a tidal stream of material that loops around the black hole. Some portion of the stellar material is captured into orbit, forming an accretion disk around the black hole, which emits electromagnetic radiation. In a small fraction of TDEs, a relativistic jet is also produced. As the material in the disk is gradually consumed by the black hole, the TDE fades over several months or years.

TDEs were predicted in the 1970s and first observed in the 1990s. Over a hundred have since been observed, with detections at optical, infrared, radio and X-ray wavelengths. Sometimes a star can survive the encounter with an SMBH, leaving a remnant; those events are termed partial TDEs.

== History ==
TDEs were first theorized by Jack G. Hills in 1975. A consequence of a star getting sufficiently close to a SMBH that the tidal forces between the star will overcome the star's self-gravity. In 1988 Martin Rees described how approximately half of the disrupted stellar material will remain bound, eventually accreting onto the black hole and forming a luminous accretion disk.

According to early studies, tidal disruption events are an inevitable consequence of massive black holes' activity hidden in galaxy nuclei. Later theorists concluded that the resulting explosion or flare of radiation from the accretion of the stellar debris could reveal the presence of a dormant black hole in the center of a normal galaxy.

TDEs were first observed in the early 1990s using the X-ray ROSAT All-Sky Survey.

== Observations ==
As of May 2024, roughly 100 TDEs are known, and have been discovered through several astronomical methods, such as optical transient surveys including Zwicky Transient Facility (ZTF) and the All Sky Automated Survey for SuperNovae (ASAS-SN). Other TDEs have been discovered in X-rays, using the ROSAT, XMM-Newton, and eROSITA. TDEs have also been discovered in the ultraviolet. The James Webb Space Telescope is capable of detecting the dust heated by TDEs because of its ability to detect infrared light.

=== Optical light curves ===
The light curves of TDEs have an initially sharp rise in brightness, as the disrupted stellar material falls towards the black hole, followed by a more gradual decline lasting months or years. During the declining phase, the luminosity is proportional to $t^{-5/3}$, where t is time, although some TDEs have been observed to deviate from the typical $t^{-5/3}$rate. These properties allow TDEs to be distinguished from other transient astronomical sources, such as supernovae. The peak luminosity of TDEs is proportional to the central black hole mass; it can approach or exceed that of their host galaxies, making them some of the brightest sources observed in the Universe.

=== Physical properties and energetics ===
There are two broad classes of TDEs. The majority of TDEs consist of "non-relativistic" events, where the outflows from the TDE are akin to the energetics seen in Type Ib and Ic supernovae.

Approximately 1% of TDEs, however, are relativistic TDEs, where an astrophysical jet is launched from the black hole shortly after the star is destroyed. This jet persists for several years before shutting off. As of 2023 only four TDEs with jets have been observed.

== Tidal-disruption radius ==
A star gets tidally disrupted when the tidal force exerted by a black hole $f_{tidal}\approx \frac{2GM_{BH}R^*}{R^3}$ exceeds the self-gravity at the surface of the star $f_{sg}\approx \frac{GM^{*}}{R^{*2}}$ . The distance below which $f_{tidal} > f_{sg}$ is called the tidal radius and is given approximately by:

$$R_T\approx R^*\left(\frac{2M_{BH}}{M^*}\right)^{\frac13}$$

This is identical to the Roche limit for disruptions of solid planetary bodies.

To observe a tidal disruption event, a black hole's tidal disruption radius must be greater than its Schwarzschild radius, $R_S = \frac{2 G M}{c^2}$. At a fixed stellar radius and mass, there is therefore a mass for the black hole where both radii become equal and the star would disappear before being torn apart. For a solar mass star, this is approximately $M_{\rm BH} \approx 10^8 M_{\odot}$.

== Notable tidal disruption events ==
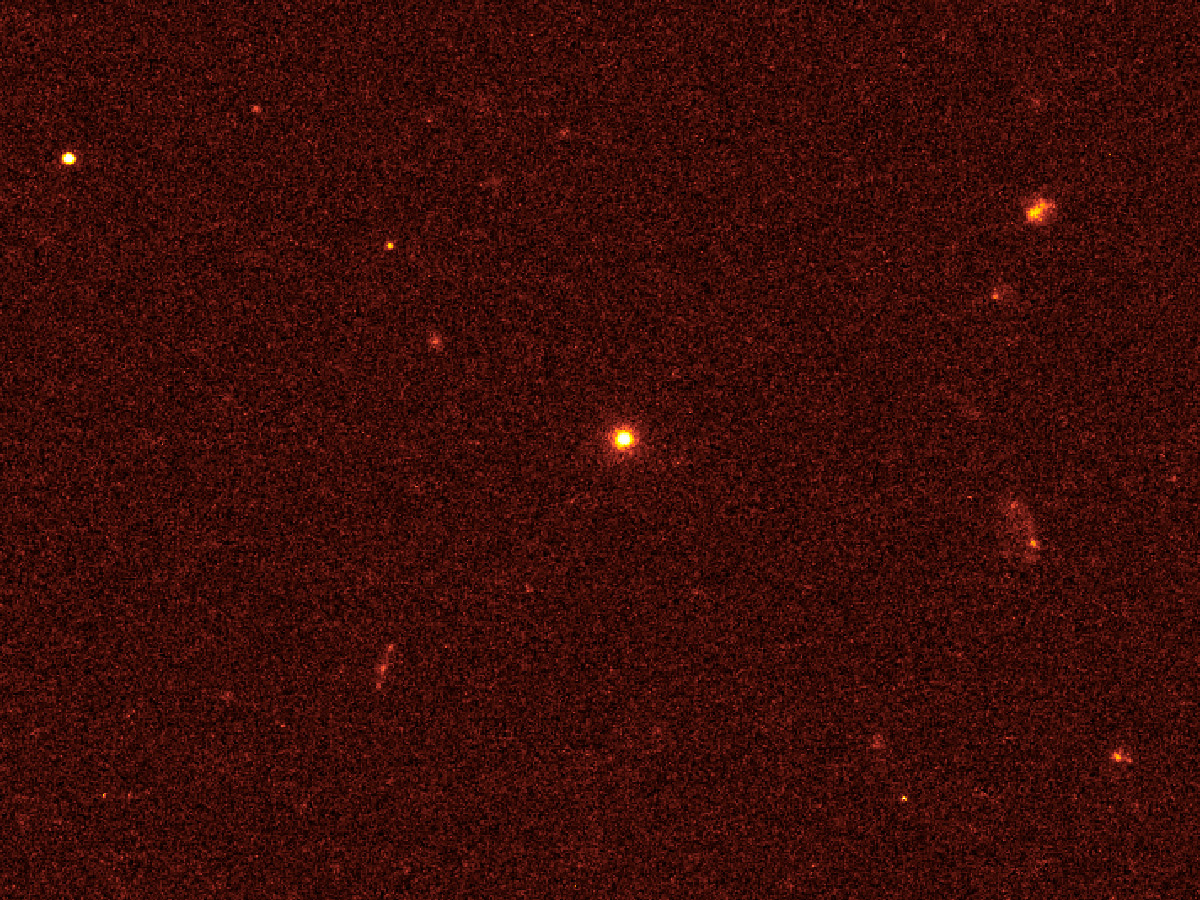
Hubble Space Telescope optical image of the TDE Swift J1644+57

- Swift J1644+57 A relativistic jet that was launched during the disruption of a star 3.8 billion light years away. The jet lasted 1.5 years, at which point it shut off.
- ASASSN-14li The first radio detection of a non-relativistic outflow from a TDE, in 2014.
- AT 2018hyz A TDE that was radio quiet until approximately 750 days after the initial TDE event, and has been rising rapidly in radio frequencies since. This has been interpreted as a delayed radio outflow, or an off-axis jet.
- ASASSN-19bt was discovered by the All Sky Automated Survey for SuperNovae (ASAS-SN) project, with early-time, detailed observations by the TESS satellite.
- AT 2019qiz
- AT 2022cmc is a jetted TDE discovered in 2022 by ZTF.
- AT 2022dbl is hypothesized to be a repetitive TDE, where a star has passed at least twice near a supermassive black hole and survived the first encounter, implying that perhaps at least some “standard” optical TDEs are in fact partial disruptions.
- ASASSN-20hx, located near the nucleus of galaxy NGC 6297, was discovered in July 2020 and noted that the observation represented one of the "very few tidal disruption events with hard powerlaw X-ray spectra".
- AT 2024tvd - the first TDE that does not seem to be located at the center of a galaxy, but rather 2600 light years from a larger supermassive black hole at the center of the host galaxy.

== See also ==
- Gamma-ray burst#Tidal disruption events
- Super soft X-ray source#Large amplitude outbursts
- RX J1242-11
