= Swift J1644+57 =

Tidal disruption event in the constellation Draco

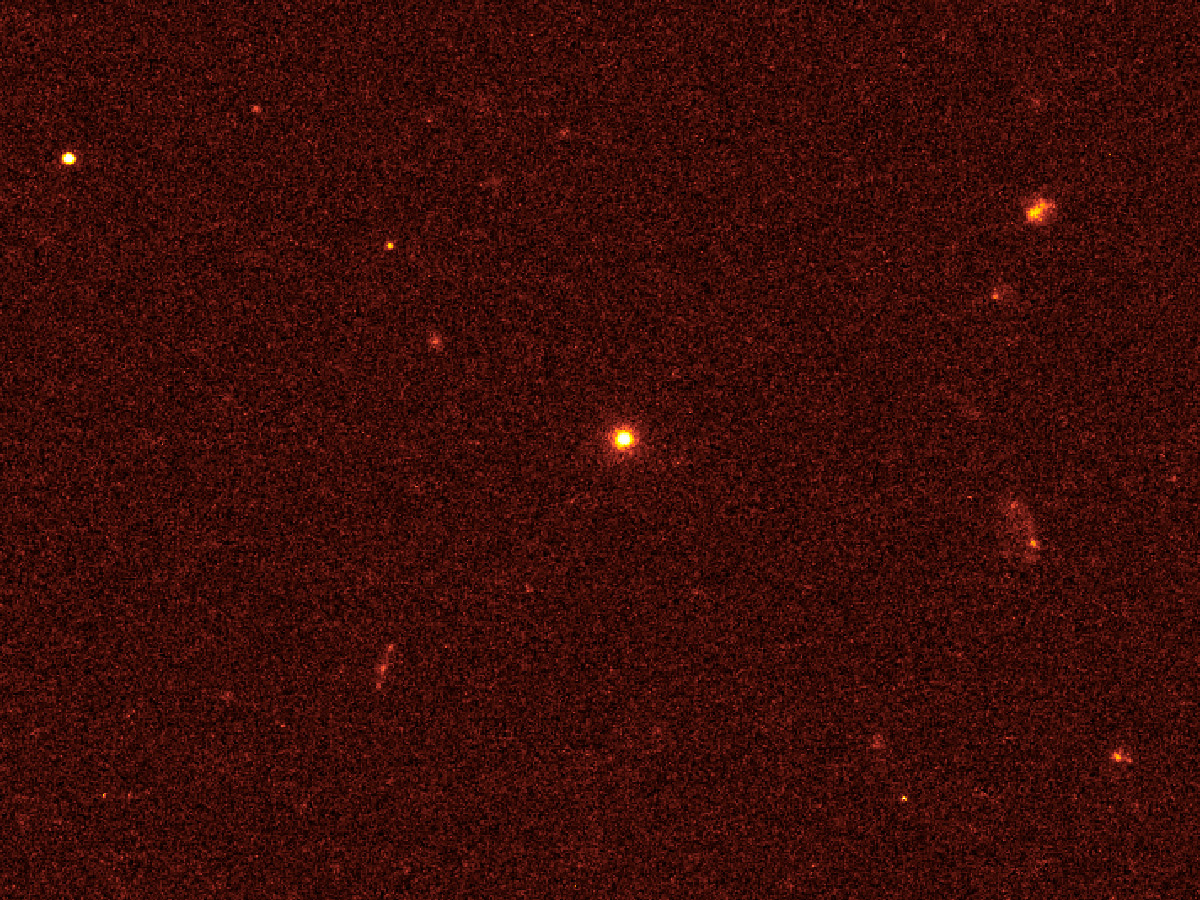
- Swift J1644+57 imaged by Hubble Space Telescope.
- Event type: Gamma-ray burst
- Duration: years
- Constellation: Draco
- Right ascension: 16^{h} 44^{m} 49.97^{s}
- Declination: +57° 34′ 59.7″
- Distance: 3,800,000,000 ly (1.2×10^{9} pc)
- Total energy output: 5×10^{48} ergs (assuming beamed emission)
- Other designations: GRB 110328A, Swift J164449.3+573451, 2MAXI J1645+576
- Related media on Commons

Swift J164449.3+573451, initially referred to as GRB 110328A, and sometimes abbreviated to Sw J1644+57, was a tidal disruption event (TDE), the destruction of a star by a supermassive black hole. It was first detected by the Swift Gamma-Ray Burst Mission on March 28, 2011. The event occurred in the center of a small galaxy in the constellation Draco, about 3.8 billion light-years away. It was the first confirmed jetted tidal disruption event and is the most luminous and energetic TDE recorded.

== Relativistic jet ==
Swift J1644+57 occurred when a star wandered too close to the central supermassive black hole in the galaxy, and was gravitationally torn apart, forming an accretion disk from stellar material. When this occurred, an astrophysical jet was launched with material traveling at relativistic speeds, near the speed of light. The beam of radiation from one of these jets pointed directly toward Earth, enhancing the apparent brightness.

Swift J1644+57 was observed by many telescopes across the electromagnetic spectrum. γ- and X-rays were detected due to jet plasma physics from the relativistic jet, with repetitive dimming and softening of the X-rays due to precession within the warped disk. The jets drive shocks into the surrounding interstellar medium, resulting in a radio to infrared afterglow. Observed linear polarization of the infrared radiation was consistent with synchrotron emission from the afterglow shock.

Continuous monitoring at radio and X-ray wavelengths indicated that after roughly 600 days (1.5 years), the relativistic jet shut off. This time likely corresponds with when the mass accretion from the stellar debris passed under the Eddington rate, at which point the jet was no longer fueled.

Since then, the outflow has become non-relativistic in speed, and emission is consistent with that of a shock wave that continues to expand into the surrounding material. As of 2021, the event is no longer detectable in X-rays but is still radio bright, and it is anticipated radio emission from Swift J1644+57 will be observable for several decades as emission continues to slowly fade.

== Host galaxy and progenitor ==
Detection of the relativistically expanding afterglow confirmed the identity of the host galaxy. Optical emission lines imply that the host is not an active galactic nucleus (AGN), but a starburst galaxy of HII galaxy classification. The supermassive black hole at the center of the galaxy is estimated to be more than 7 million solar masses (M_{☉}).

Timing considerations suggest that the tidally disrupted star was possibly a white dwarf and not a regular main sequence star. When the relativistic jet turned off, given the mass of astronomers calculated the amount of mass needed to fuel the jet for the Swift J1644+57 black hole as ~0.15 M_{☉}, which is consistent with a solar mass star.

== See also ==
- Supermassive black hole
- Tidal force
