= RX J1242−11 =

Galaxy with super massive black hole

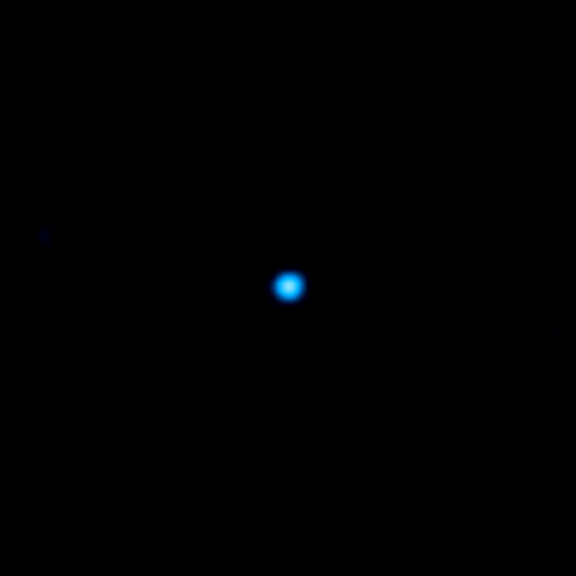
- A Chandra X-ray Observatory image of RX J1242-11.

Observation data (J2000 epoch)
- Constellation: Virgo
- Right ascension: 12^{h} 42^{m} 36.9^{s}
- Declination: −11° 19′ 35″
- Distance: 650 Mly (200 Mpc)
- Apparent magnitude (V): c. +14 ^{m}

Characteristics
- Type: elliptical
- Notable features: Pair of Galaxies = [KG99] A + [KG99] B.

Other designations
- RX J1242.6-1119A
- References: 2MASS J12423854-1119207

RX J1242.6−1119A (often abbreviated RX J1242−11) is an elliptical galaxy located approximately 200 megaparsecs (about 650 million light-years) from Earth. The name is derived from RX J1242.6-1119, the term for an X-ray source identified by ROSAT as a galaxy pair [KG99] A & B.

== Supermassive black hole ==
X-ray observatories provide direct evidence for the catastrophic destruction of a star that wandered too close to a supermassive black hole.

According to current interpretations of X-ray observations made by the Chandra X-ray Observatory and XMM-Newton, the center of this galaxy is a 100 million solar mass supermassive black hole which was observed to have tidally disrupted a star (in 1992 or shortly before). The discovery is widely considered to be the first strong evidence of a supermassive black hole ripping apart a star and consuming a portion of it.

== Location in the sky ==
The location of RX J1242.6-1119A, as seen from Earth, is less than one degree to the northeast of Messier 104, the Sombrero Galaxy.
