= AT 2019qiz =

Tidal distribution event

- Event type: Tidal disruption event
- Constellation: Eridanus
- Right ascension: 04^{h} 46^{m} 37.88^{s}
- Declination: −10° 13′ 34.90″
- Distance: 215 million light years (65 Mpc)
- Redshift: 0.01513
- Host: 2MASX J04463790-1013349

AT 2019qiz is a tidal disruption event (TDE) that occurred at a distance of 215 million light years (65 megaparsec), from Earth. It is the nearest TDE discovered to date. It was discovered in September 2019 by observations in ultraviolet, optical, X-ray and radio wavelengths made at the European Southern Observatory (ESO) situated in Chile and was presented in October 2020 by research published in the monthly notices of the Royal Astronomical Society. It involves a star with a sun-like mass and a black hole with a mass of around 10^{6} solar masses. The TDE appears very young and increasing in brightness. The encounter tore away half of the mass of the star and threw debris at a speed of 10,000 km/s, comparable to that observed in supernova explosions.
