= C/2017 O1 (ASASSN) =

Non-periodic comet

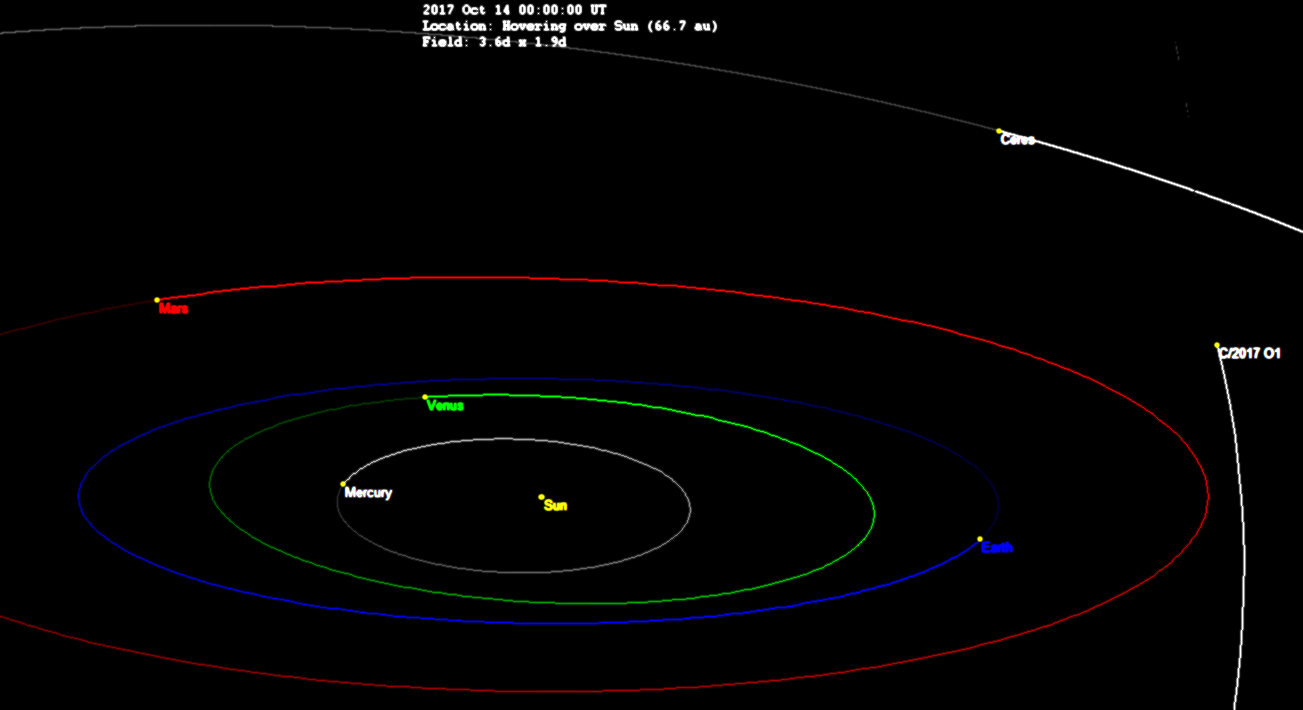
- The comet's perihelion is just outside of the orbit of Mars on October 14, 2017.

Discovery
- Discovered by: All Sky Automated Survey for SuperNovae
- Discovery site: Cerro Tololo, Chile
- Discovery date: 19 July 2017

Designations
- Alternative designations: ASASSN1; CK17O010

Orbital characteristics
- Epoch: 13 October 2017 (JD 2458039.5)
- Observation arc: 601 days (1.65 years)
- Number of observations: 2,877
- Aphelion: 837.04 AU
- Perihelion: 1.4987 AU
- Semi-major axis: 419.27 AU
- Eccentricity: 0.99642
- Orbital period: ~8600 yr (inbound); ~8200 yr (outbound)
- Inclination: 39.849°
- Longitude of ascending node: 25.810°
- Argument of periapsis: 20.907°
- Last perihelion: 14 October 2017
- T_{Jupiter}: 1.177
- Earth MOID: 0.5348 AU
- Jupiter MOID: 2.2744 AU

Physical characteristics
- Mean radius: 0.919±0.092 km
- Mean density: 450±70 kg/m^{3}
- Comet total magnitude (M1): 12.4

C/2017 O1 (ASASSN) is a comet discovered by the All Sky Automated Survey for SuperNovae (ASAS-SN). It was first detected on July 19, 2017, located in the southern constellation Cetus.

== Discovery ==
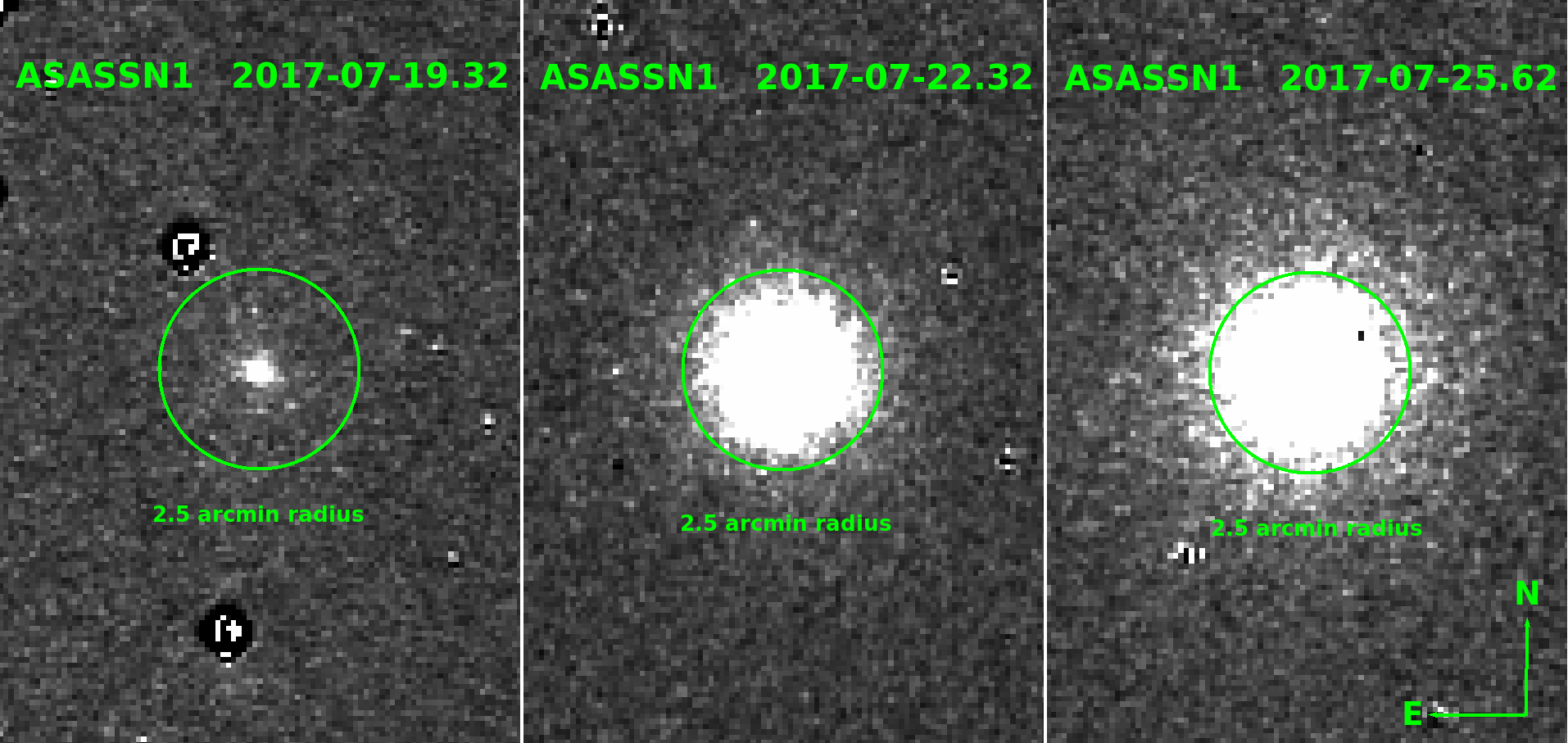
ASAS-SN discovery image and two more epochs of Comet ASASSN1

During the ongoing ASAS-SN survey, using data from the quadruple 14-cm "Cassius" telescope on Cerro Tololo, Chile, a possible new moving transient source was detected on July 19, 2017; the team gave it the temporary designation ASASSN1.

In the discovery images, C/2017 O1 had a V band magnitude of 15.3. The centroid was moving between the ASAS-SN three 90 second, dithered discovery images with no counterpart in the Minor Planet Center database. Follow-up images from the Savannah Skies Observatory recovered C/2017 O1 9.7 hours later 0.21 degrees away. These observations revealed C/2017 O1 had a halo at least 25 arcsec in radius, a compact core, and no clear tail. Further observations were made using the Las Cumbres Observatory 1m at CTIO 24.7 hours after discovery which recovered C/2017 O1 at a g-band magnitude of 15.2. C/2017 O1 was then found 0.77 degrees away from C/2017 O1's original location 35.7 hours after discovery. ASAS-SN's Cassius unit re-observed this field 3 days after discovery and found that C/2017 O1 significantly brightened to V band 11.9 magnitude. In addition to brightening, the coma around C/2017 O1 also increased significantly to 2.5 arcmin. Finally, the northern ASAS-SN unit, a quadruple 14-cm "Brutus" telescope on Haleakala Hawaii, observed C/2017 O1 6 days after discovery and found that C/2017 O1 appears to have faded to V~12.2.

== Physical characteristics ==
Its nucleus has an estimated effective radius of 0.919 ± 0.092 km (0.571 ± 0.057 mi).

== Trajectory in sky ==
The comet was discovered in Cetus in July, moving into Taurus in September, and Perseus and Camelopardalis in later September and early October. Its perihelion is on October 14, and closest to the earth on October 18. It moves towards the north pole and northern Cepheus into December.

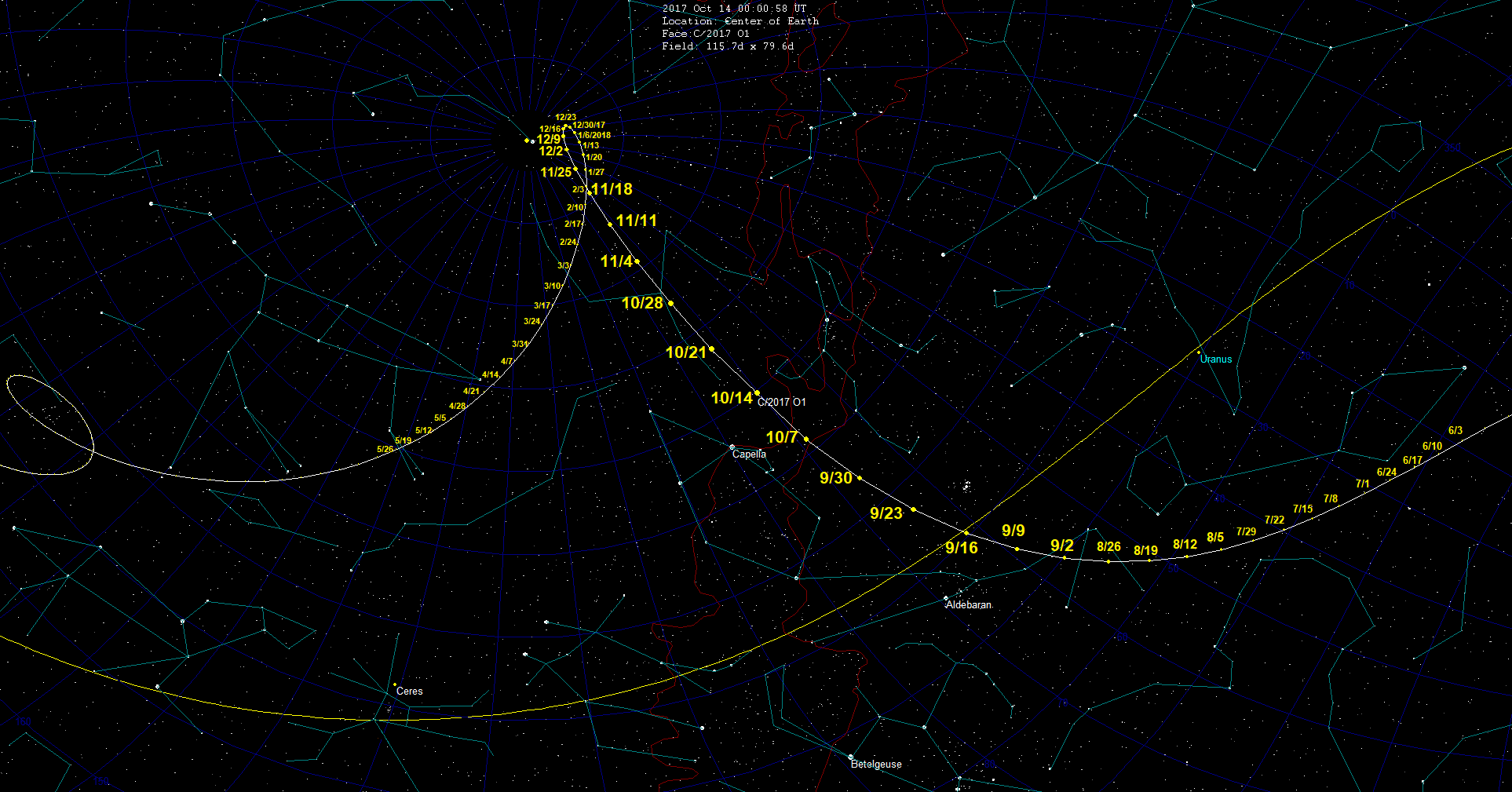
This chart shows its weekly motion across the sky.
