= All Sky Automated Survey for SuperNovae =

Program to search for new supernovae

- Alternative names: ASAS-SN
- Website: www.astronomy.ohio-state.edu/~assassin/

The All Sky Automated Survey for SuperNovae (ASAS-SN) is an automated program to search for new supernovae and other astronomical transients, headed by astronomers from the Ohio State University, including Christopher Kochanek and Krzysztof Stanek. It has 20 robotic telescopes in both the northern and southern hemispheres. It can survey the entire sky approximately once every day.

Initially, there were four ASAS-SN telescopes at Haleakala and another four at Cerro Tololo, a Las Cumbres Observatory site. Twelve more telescopes were deployed in 2017 in Chile, South Africa and Texas, with funds from the Gordon and Betty Moore Foundation, the Ohio State University, the Mount Cuba Astronomical Foundation, China, Chile, Denmark, and Germany. All the telescopes (Nikon telephoto 400mm/F2.8 lenses) have a diameter of 14 cm and ProLine PL230 CCD cameras. The pixel resolution in the cameras is 7.8 arc seconds, so follow-up observations on other telescopes are usually required to get a more accurate location.

The main goal of the project is to look for bright supernovae, and its discoveries have included the most powerful supernova event ever discovered, ASASSN-15lh. However, other transient objects are frequently discovered, including nearby tidal disruption events (TDEs) (e.g., ASASSN-19bt), Galactic novae (e.g., ASASSN-16kt, ASASSN-16ma, and ASASSN-18fv), cataclysmic variables, and stellar flares, including several of the largest flares ever seen. In July 2017 ASAS-SN discovered its first comet, ASASSN1, and in July 2019 it provided crucial data for the near-Earth asteroid 2019 OK. It can detect new objects as dim as apparent magnitude 18.

Objects discovered receive designations starting with ASASSN followed by a dash, a two digit year and letters, for example ASASSN-19bt.
