= MicroFUN =

Microlensing Network

The Microlensing Follow-Up Network (μFUN, pronounced "micro-fun") is an informal group of observers who monitor high magnification gravitational microlensing events in the Milky Way's Galactic Bulge. Its goal is to detect extrasolar planets via microlensing of the parent star by the planet. μFUN is a follow-up network - they monitor microlensing events identified by survey groups such as OGLE and Microlensing Observations in Astrophysics (MOA).

In January 2009, μFUN merged with the Probing Lensing Anomalies NETwork (PLANET).

Organizations like μFUN provide a forum and a listserv for instant notification to amateur and professional astronomers all over the globe, so that microlensing events can be mined for all the information that can be gathered. Thus, amateur astronomers have a useful role in significant discoveries, as well as a clear and democratic path to authorship on any peer-reviewed scientific publications that result.

== Microlensing ==
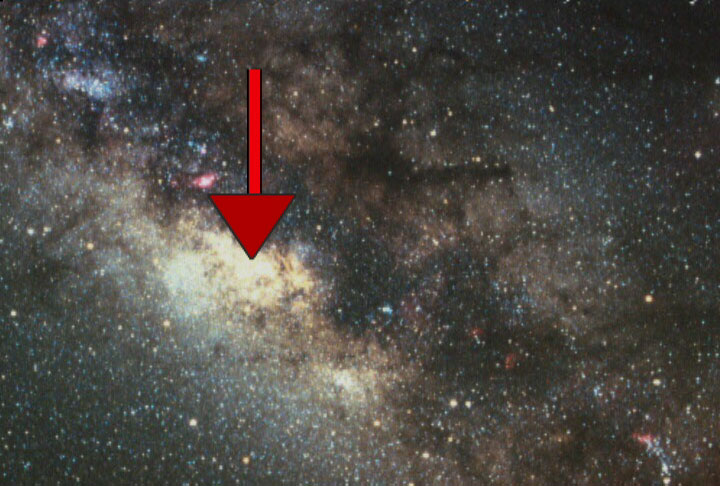
A Star with an Orbiting Planet Discovered via Microlensing at the Center of the Milky Way in 1991.

Gravitational lensing is an effect of Albert Einstein's general relativity, which says that all matter bends light that passes by it. Strong gravitational lensing drastically alters the shape of an object on the sky; weak gravitational lensing slightly alters the shape of the object; and gravitational microlensing alters only the brightness of the object, instead of its shape. Gravitational lensing in general, and especially microlensing, has had a vast impact on astronomy, specifically in the search for extrasolar planets.

If a planet orbiting a star passes within our line of sight to that star, it very slightly changes the brightness of the star. These changes can last a few hours or a few days. Astronomers can estimate the ratio of the planet's mass to the star's mass, as well as the radius of the planet's orbit around the star, by comparing actual brightness measurements to theoretical models.

Expensive equipment is required to detect a microlensing event, but because of the magnification, less sophisticated telescopic equipment can monitor the magnified area for changes in brightness caused by planets. Equipment that is now available has become more efficient at detecting microlensing events, but this equipment is in high demand for all sorts of astronomical observations and cannot be dedicated to monitoring these events for disruptions caused by planets.

Amateur astronomers have no access restriction to their equipment and can "follow up" on microlensing events that have been detected, therefore contributing to the discovery of several extrasolar planets. The short duration and unpredictable nature of disruptions during microlensing events require this kind of coverage, making amateur efforts very important to searching for extrasolar planets using microlensing. μFUN facilitates the collaboration between amateur and professional astronomers that is necessary for the continued discovery of extrasolar planets.

== Planets discovered ==
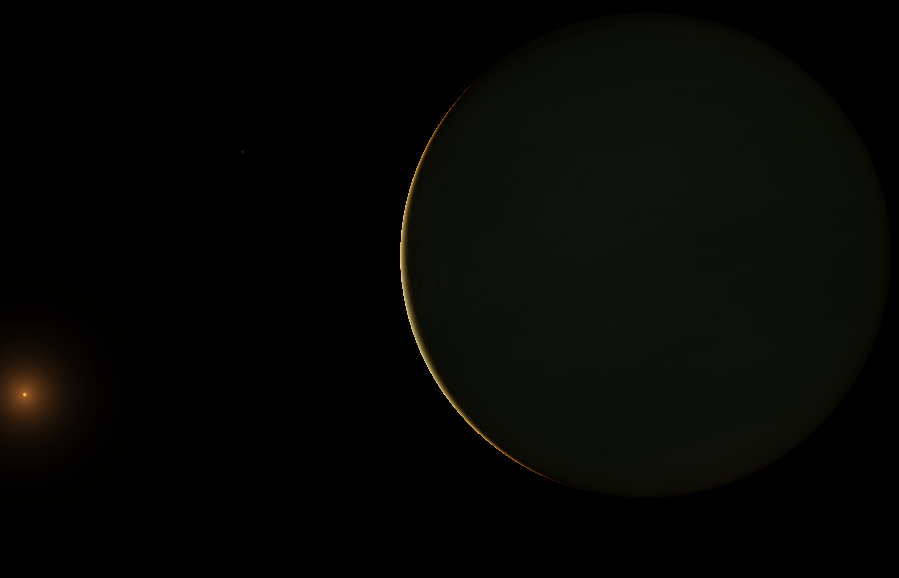
Artist's rendition of OGLE-2005-BLG-071Lb.

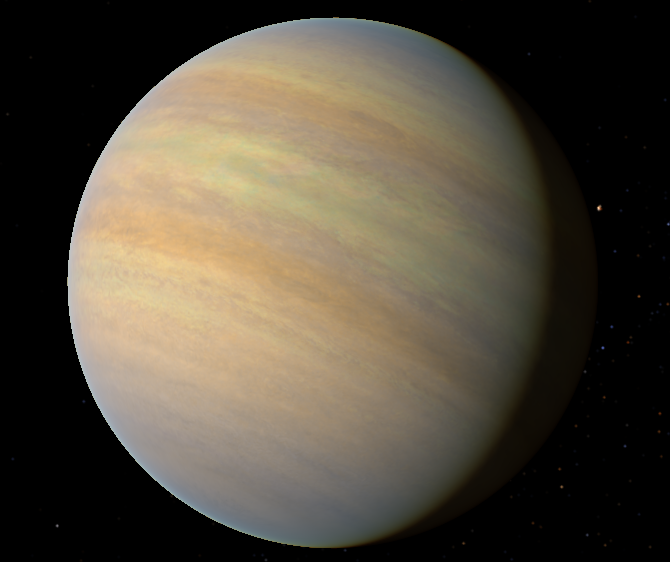
Artist's rendition of MOA-2007-BLG-400.

μFUN played an important role in discovery and analysis of the following extrasolar planets:

- OGLE-2005-BLG-071Lb
- OGLE-2005-BLG-071Lb
- OGLE-2005-BLG-169Lb
- OGLE-2006-BLG-109Lb, OGLE-2006-BLG-109Lc
- MOA-2007-BLG-400Lb
- MOA-2008-BLG-310Lb
- MOA-2009-BLG-387Lb
- MOA-2009-BLG-319Lb
- MOA-2011-BLG-293Lb,
- MOA-2010-BLG-477,

== Public involvement ==
There are various ways to get involved with μFUN. Since μFUN is a follow-up network, initial data and observations come from outside sources, primarily OGLE-III and MOA. However, many planetary successes come from amateur observers with small and medium-aperture telescopes. Because microlensing requires diligence and precision, μFUN has formulated data requirements that observers must meet. Data requirements and techniques for using small telescopes for microlensing can be found in the article "Detecting Exoplanets by Gravitational Microlensing using a Small Telescope" by Grant Christie of the Auckland Observatory.

Microlensing events with medium aperture telescopes are discovered primarily through observatories and typically require a heftier computer system and observation team. The basic set up and data requirements are also described in detail on the μFUN website. Getting involved at the medium-aperture telescope level most likely would mean joining an observation group in a professional research lab. There are many observation sites around the globe, and they are primarily in the southern hemisphere. A full list of observation groups and their corresponding equipment can be found at μFUN's website.

== See also ==
- Microlensing Observations in Astrophysics (MOA)
- Optical Gravitational Lensing Experiment (OGLE)
- Gravitational lensing
- Gravitational microlensing
- Extrasolar planets
