= OGLE-TR-132b =

Hot Jupiter

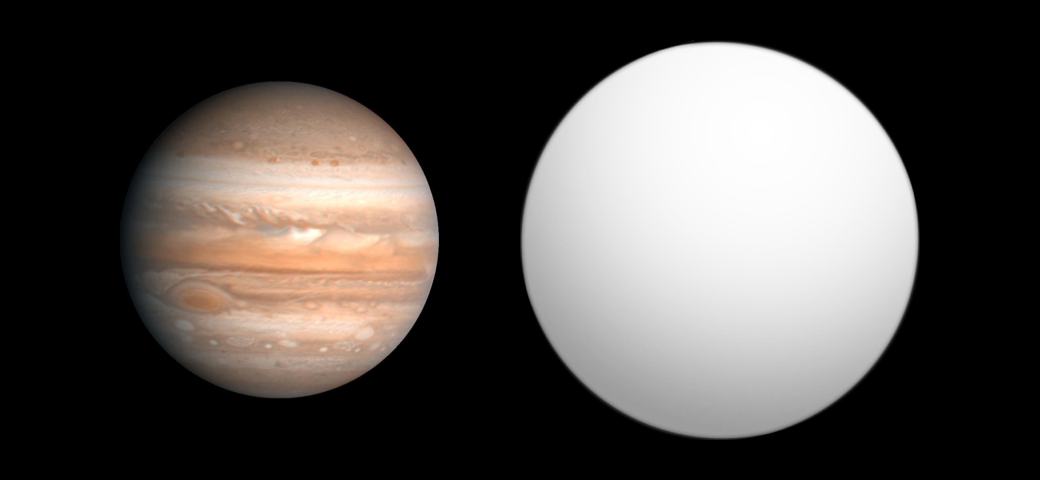
- Size comparison of OGLE-TR-132b with Jupiter

Discovery
- Discovered by: Bouchy et al.
- Discovery date: 14 April 2004
- Detection method: Transit

Orbital characteristics
- Semi-major axis: 0.0306 ± 0.0008 AU (4,580,000 ± 120,000 km)
- Eccentricity: 0
- Orbital period (sidereal): 1.689868 ±3e-06 d
- Inclination: 85 ±1
- Star: OGLE-TR-132

Physical characteristics
- Mean radius: 1.18 ±0.07 R_{J}
- Mass: 1.14 ±0.12 M_{J}

OGLE-TR-132b is an extrasolar planet orbiting the star OGLE-TR-132.

In 2003 the Optical Gravitational Lensing Experiment (OGLE) detected periodic dimming in the star's light curve indicating a transiting, planetary-sized object. Since low-mass red dwarfs and brown dwarfs may mimic a planet radial velocity measurements were necessary to calculate the mass of the body. In 2004 the object was proved to be a new transiting extrasolar planet.

The planet has a mass 1.14 times that of Jupiter. Since the planet's inclination is known, this represents the best measured true mass of the planet, rather than simply the minimum mass as is the case when the inclination is unknown. It orbits the star (OGLE-TR-132) in an extremely close orbit, even closer than the famous planets 51 Pegasi b and HD 209458 b. The planet races around the star every 1 day 16.6 hours. The radius of the planet is only 18% larger than Jupiter's, despite the heating effect by the star. Planets of its kind are sometimes called "super-hot Jupiters".

== See also ==
- OGLE-TR-113b
- OGLE-TR-10b
- OGLE-TR-111b
- OGLE-TR-56b
- OGLE2-TR-L9b
