= 2006 in science =

The year 2006 in science and technology involved some significant events.

== Astronomy ==
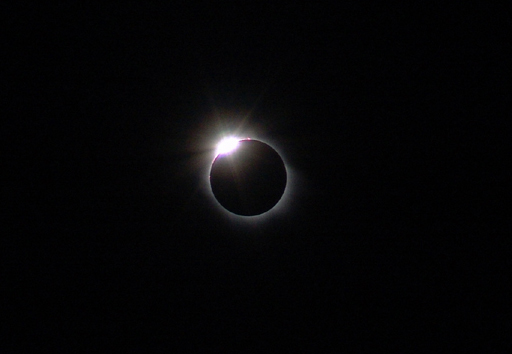
March 29 total eclipse from Turkey

- January 15 – NASA's Stardust mission successfully ends, the first to return dust from a comet.
- January 25 – The discovery of the planet OGLE-2005-BLG-390Lb through gravitational microlensing is announced by PLANET/RoboNet, OGLE and MOA
- February 1 – 2003 UB_{313} is found to be larger than Pluto.
- February 13 – The recurrent nova RS Ophiuchi erupts. The last outburst occurred in 1985.
- March 9 – NASA's Cassini-Huygens spacecraft discovers geysers of a liquid substance shooting from Saturn's moon Enceladus, signaling a possible presence of water.
- March 29 – Total solar eclipse (Brazil, Greece, Mid Atlantic Ocean, Sahara, Turkey, Georgia, Russia, Kazakhstan, Mongolia).
- June 30 – The discovery of nine additional natural satellites of Saturn published.
- August 24 – Pluto is redesignated as a dwarf planet by the International Astronomical Union, joining 2003 UB_{313} and 1 Ceres.
- September 13 – 2003 UB_{313} is assigned the name Eris.
- September 14 – The asteroid subsequently designated 2006 RH_{120} is identified as it becomes a temporary satellite of Earth.
- September 22 – Annular solar eclipse in South America, West Africa and Antarctica.

== Biology ==
- April 15 – Anthony Atala and team at Wake Forest Baptist Medical Center in the United States publish their success in transplanting the first laboratory-grown organs, bladders, into human patients.
- May 15 – The sequence of the last chromosome in the Human Genome Project is published in the journal Nature.
- September – The Western Balsam Poplar (Populus trichocarpa) is the first tree whose full DNA code has been determined by DNA sequencing.
- December 13 – Baiji (Yangtze river dolphin) declared "functionally extinct".
- Adrian Owen demonstrates for the first time that functional neuroimaging can be used to detect awareness in patients incapable of generating any recognised behavioural response and appearing to be in a persistent vegetative state.
- Haifan Lin discovers Piwi-interacting RNA.
- Last sightings of the Western black rhinoceros and of the natural-born Northern white rhinoceros.
- Nontherian mammal fossils are identified among the St Bathans Fauna of New Zealand's South Island.

== Computer science ==
- July 15 – Social networking service Twitter launched publicly.
- November 1 – Sony PRS500 e-book reader launched in the United States.

== Environment ==
- January 19 – Australian researchers at the CSIRO Marine and Atmospheric Research centre in Hobart, Tasmania, publish experimental data that matches models of increasing sea level rising.

== Mathematics ==
- The great prime search project finds the 44th Mersenne prime.

== Physics ==
- September 19 – Lee Smolin publishes The Trouble with Physics: The Rise of String Theory, the Fall of a Science, and What Comes Next in the United States.

== Space exploration ==
- January 15 – The Stardust spacecraft successfully completes its primary mission of returning samples of cometary and interstellar dust to Earth. Its sample return capsule touches down safely inside its intended landing area in Utah, close to the Army Dugway Proving Ground.
- January 19 – The NASA spacecraft New Horizons launches successfully from Cape Canaveral Air Force Station and leaves Earth's orbit shortly afterwards on its journey to Pluto
- February 2 – NASA's public affairs office is accused of censoring the comments by James Hansen of the Goddard Institute for Space Studies in New York.
- March 24 – The maiden flight of the SpaceX Falcon 1 rocket ends in failure.
- July 12 – The launch of the first private experimental space habitat, Genesis I.
- September 12 – The construction of the International Space Station is continued for the first time after a hiatus of almost four years.

== Technology ==
- Groupe SEB introduce the world's first air fryer, under the Actifry brand of convection oven, in the French consumer market.

== Other events ==
- January 27 – Scientific misconduct: The University of Tokyo announces that Kazunari Taira's experimental results in RNA research are irreproducible.
- March 13 – Six healthy young men taking part in the first-in-man study for an anti-inflammatory drug TGN1412 in London are placed in intensive care with adverse side-effects, some suffering a life-threatening cytokine storm.
- November – The Burndy Library is merged into the Huntington Library in San Marino, California, enhancing its status as a center for the study of the history of science and technology.

== Awards ==
- Nobel Prize
  - Nobel Prize in Physiology or Medicine: Andrew Fire and Craig Mello
  - Nobel Prize in Physics: John C. Mather and George Smoot
  - Nobel Prize in Chemistry: Roger Kornberg
- Abel Prize in Mathematics: Lennart Carleson
- Fields Prize in Mathematics: Andrei Okounkov, Grigori Perelman (declined), Terence Tao, and Wendelin Werner

== Deaths ==
- January 24 – Sir Nicholas Shackleton (b. 1937), English Quaternary geologist and paleoclimatologist, recipient of the Vetlesen Prize (2004).
- February 28 – Owen Chamberlain (b. 1920), American Nobel laureate in physics (1959).
- March 28 – Charles Schepens (born 1912), Belgian-born American ophthalmologist.
- May 1 – Kikuo Takano (b. 1927), Japanese poet and mathematician.
- May 14 – Bruce Merrifield (b. 1921), American Nobel laureate in chemistry (1984) for developing a rapid, automated system for making peptides.
- May 31 – Raymond Davis Jr. (b. 1914), American Nobel laureate in physics (2002) for pioneering the detection of cosmic neutrinos.
- August 9 – James Van Allen (b. 1914), American space scientist.
- August 29 – Robert J. Gorlin (b. 1923), American pathologist.
- August 10 – Genevieve Grotjan Feinstein (b. 1913), American mathematician and cryptanalyst.
- November 11 – Esther Lederberg (b. 1922), American microbiologist.
- November 22 – Asima Chatterjee (b. 1917), Indian organic chemist.
