= OGLE-2006-BLG-109L =

Galactic bulge star

- Location of OGLE-2006-BLG-109L (green) in the constellation of Scorpius.

Observation data Epoch J2000.0 Equinox J2000.0
- Constellation: Scorpius
- Right ascension: 17^{h} 52^{m} 35.0^{s}
- Declination: −30° 05′ 16″
- Apparent magnitude (V): 17.17

Characteristics
- Spectral type: Unsure (probably M0V)

Astrometry
Distance	4,920±390 ly (1,510±120 pc)

Details
Mass	0.51±0.04 M_{☉}
Temperature	~4,000 K

Other designations
- EWS 2006-BUL-109

Database references
SIMBAD	data

OGLE-2006-BLG-109L (where the last 'L' stands for lens) is a dim magnitude 17 M0V galactic bulge star approximately 4,920 light-years away in the constellation of Scorpius.

== Planetary system ==
In 2008, two extrasolar planets were discovered around the star using gravitational microlensing. The two planets are at a distance from their star that make them suspected analogs of Jupiter and Saturn.

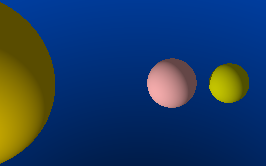
A scheme of the planetary system.

The star is surrounded by a planetary system consisting of at least two planets: b with a mass of 0.727 of Jupiter and c with the mass of approximately 0.271 of Jupiter. Their mass ratios, distance ratios, and equilibrium temperatures are similar to those of Jupiter and Saturn in the Solar System as well as the 47 UMa system.

Both planets were discovered simultaneously by gravitational microlensing in a common effort by the Optical Gravitational Lensing Experiment, microFUN, MOA, PLANET and RoboNet collaborations, as announced on 14 February 2008. This is the first planetary system where more than one planet was detected using gravitational microlensing.

The OGLE-2006-BLG-109L planetary system
Companion (in order from star)	Mass	Semimajor axis (AU)	Orbital period (days)	Eccentricity	Inclination (°)	Radius
b	0.727 ± 0.06 M_{J}	2.3 ± 0.5	1790 ± 548	?	—	—
c	0.271 ± 0.022 M_{J}	4.5 ± 1	4931 ± 1750	0.15 ± 0.1	—	—

== See also ==
- Optical Gravitational Lensing Experiment or OGLE
- OGLE-2005-BLG-390L
