= OGLE-2016-BLG-1190Lb =

Exosolar object orbiting OGLE-2016-BLG-1190L

Discovery
- Discovered by: Ryu, Y.-H. et al
- Discovery site: Spitzer Space Telescope
- Discovery date: 2017
- Detection method: Gravitational microlensing

Orbital characteristics
- Semi-major axis: 2.17 AU (325,000,000 km)
- Eccentricity: 0.42
- Orbital period (sidereal): 1223.6 d
- Inclination: 41.2
- Star: OGLE-2016-BLG-1190L

Physical characteristics
- Mass: 13.38 M_{J}

OGLE-2016-BLG-1190Lb is an extremely massive exoplanet, with a mass about 13.4 times that of Jupiter (M_{J}), or is, possibly, a low mass brown dwarf, orbiting the G-dwarf star OGLE-2016-BLG-1190L, located about 22,000 light years from Earth, in the constellation of Sagittarius, in the galactic bulge of the Milky Way.

“Since the existence of the brown dwarf desert is the signature of different formation mechanisms for stars and planets, the extremely close proximity of OGLE-2016-BLG-1190Lb to this desert raises the question of whether it is truly a ‘planet’ (by formation mechanism) and therefore reacts back upon its role tracing the galactic distribution of planets," according to astronomers reporting the findings.

== Discovery ==
The host star was discovered in June 2016 by the Optical Gravitational Lensing Experiment (OGLE) collaboration; the Spitzer Space Telescope observed the microlensing event a few days after its discovery. OGLE-2016-BLG-1190Lb is the first exoplanet discovered by microlensing with the Spitzer space telescope and the first exoplanet discovered lying near the planet/brown dwarf boundary. In addition, the discovery "is likely to be the first Spitzer microlensing planet in the Galactic bulge/bar," according to the initial reported study.

== See also ==
- OGLE-2005-BLG-169Lb
- OGLE-2005-BLG-390Lb
- OGLE-2016-BLG-1195Lb
- Optical Gravitational Lensing Experiment (OGLE)
