= OGLE-2007-BLG-349Lb =

Super Neptune in a circumbinary orbit

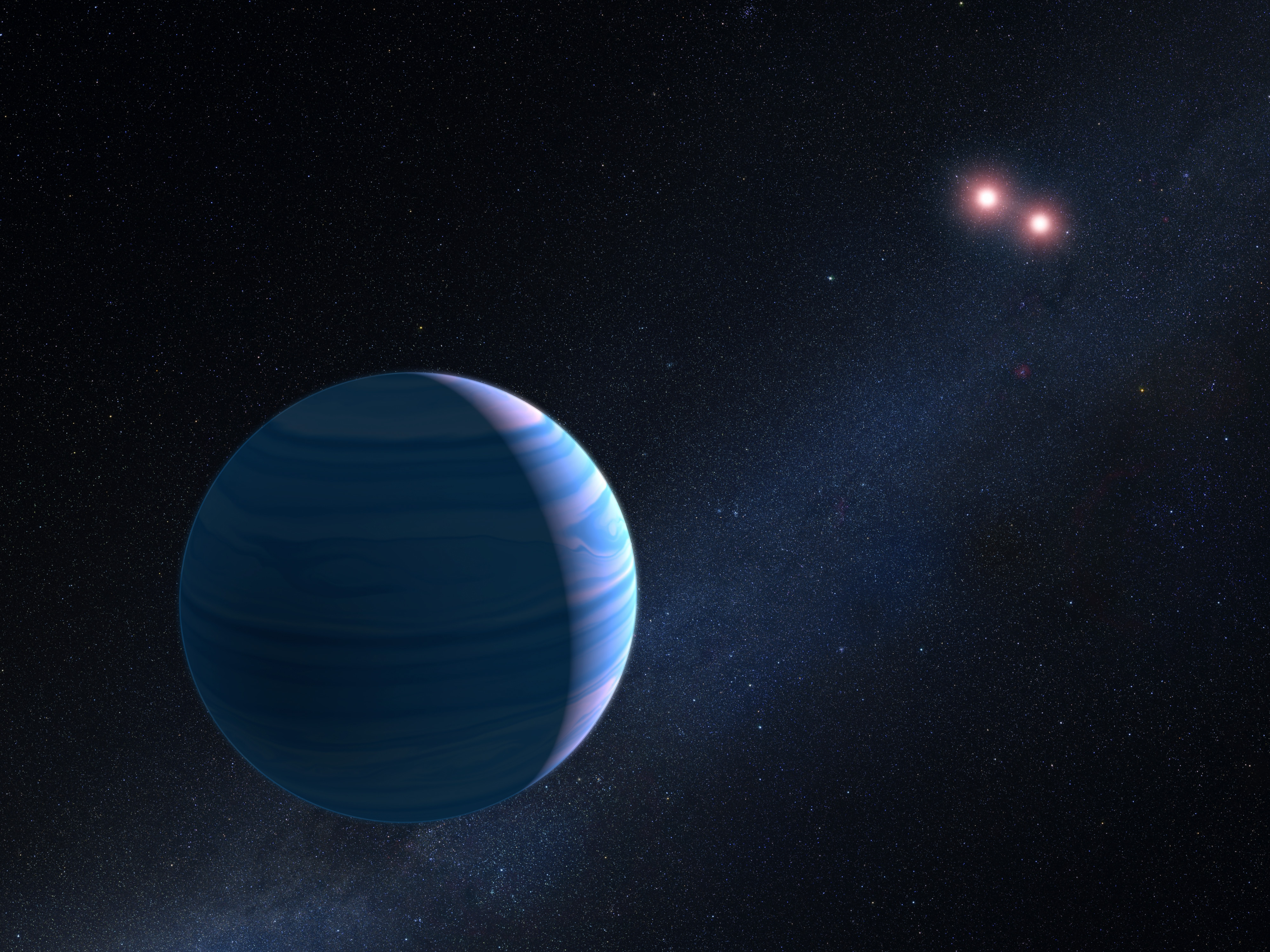
- Artist's impression of OGLE-2007-BLG-349Lb (foreground) orbiting its parent stars (upper right).

Discovery
- Discovered by: Hubble Space Telescope
- Discovery date: 22 September 2016
- Detection method: Gravitational microlensing

Orbital characteristics
- Star: OGLE-2007-BLG-349

Physical characteristics
- Mass: 80 (± 13) M_{🜨}

OGLE-2007-BLG-349Lb (Note: The initial paper intentionally refers to the planet as planet "c", as their solution to "an apparent inconsistency" in exoplanet naming convention. Other sources, such as the SIMBAD Astronomical Database and Extrasolar Planets Encyclopaedia, refer to it as planet "b", however NASA Exoplanet Archive does not.) is a circumbinary extrasolar planet about 8,000 light-years away in the constellation of Sagittarius. It is the first circumbinary exoplanet to be discovered using the microlensing method of detecting exoplanets.

== Characteristics ==
=== Mass and orbit ===
OGLE-2007-BLG-349Lb is a super-Neptune, an exoplanet that has a mass and radius larger than that of Neptune. It has a mass of around 80 M_{🜨}. This is somewhat close to the mass of Saturn, 95 M_{🜨}, so OGLE-2007-BLG-349Lb can also be considered a gas giant. It orbits at a distance of around 2.9 AU in a circumbinary orbit, meaning it orbits around two stars.

=== Host star ===
The planet orbits in a circumbinary (M-type) binary star system named OGLE-2007-BLG-349L. They orbit around each other roughly every 9 days. The stars have masses of 0.41 and 0.30 M_{☉}, respectively. The age of the system, radii and temperatures of the stars are not known. In comparison, the Sun is 4.6 billion years old and has a surface temperature of 5778 K. The star's apparent magnitude, or how bright it appears from Earth's perspective, is 14.3. Therefore, it is too dim to be seen with the naked eye.

== See also ==
- Optical Gravitational Lensing Experiment (OGLE)
- 47 Ursae Majoris b
- OGLE-2005-BLG-390Lb
- OGLE-2006-BLG-109Lb
