= OGLE-TR-111b =

Hot Jupiter orbiting OGLE-TR-111

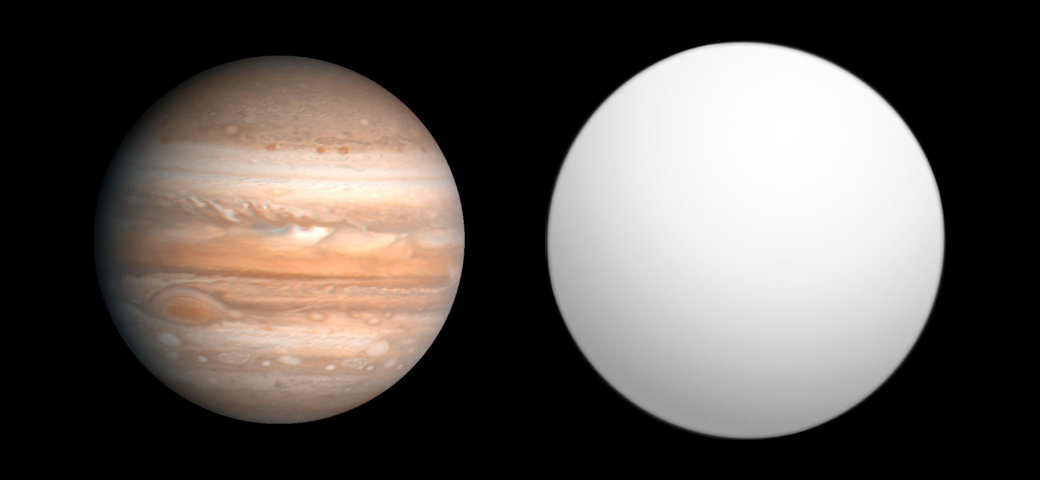
- Size comparison of OGLE-TR-111b with Jupiter

Discovery
- Discovered by: Udalski et al.
- Discovery site: Poland
- Discovery date: 2002
- Detection method: Transit and Doppler

Orbital characteristics
- Semi-major axis: 0.047 ± 0.001 AU (7,030,000 ± 150,000 km)
- Eccentricity: 0
- Orbital period (sidereal): 4.01610 d
- Inclination: 88.1
- Time of periastron: 2,452,330.44867
- Star: OGLE-TR-111

Physical characteristics
- Mean radius: 1.067 R_{J}
- Mass: 0.53 ± 0.11 M_{J}
- Mean density: 0.70 g/cm^{3}
- Surface gravity: 12.5 m/s^{2} (1.27 g_{0})

OGLE-TR-111b is an extrasolar planet approximately 5,000 light-years away in the constellation of Carina (the Keel). The planet is currently the only confirmed planet orbiting the star OGLE-TR-111 (though a possible second planet is plausible).

In 2002 the Optical Gravitational Lensing Experiment (OGLE) survey detected that the light from the star periodically dimmed very slightly every 4 days, indicating a planet-sized body transiting the star. But since the mass of the object had not been measured, it was not clear that it was a true planet, low-mass red dwarf or something else. In 2004 radial velocity measurements showed unambiguously that the transiting body is indeed a planet.

The planet is probably very similar to the other hot Jupiters orbiting nearby stars. Its mass is about half that of Jupiter and it orbits the star at a distance less than 1/20th that of Earth from the Sun.

OGLE-TR-111b has similar mass and orbital distance as the first transiting planet, HD 209458 b (Osiris). But unlike it, the planet has a radius comparable to Jupiter which is typical to other transiting planets detected by OGLE. However, those other planets tend to be more massive and orbit even closer than typical hot Jupiters. Therefore, this planet is an important "missing link" between the different types of transiting planets.

== See also ==
- HD 209458 b
- Lists of exoplanets
- OGLE-2005-BLG-390Lb
- OGLE-TR-10b
- OGLE-TR-56b
- OGLE-TR-113b
- OGLE2-TR-L9b
- Optical Gravitational Lensing Experiment
- WASP-11b/HAT-P-10b
