= OGLE-TR-111 =

Star in the constellation Carina

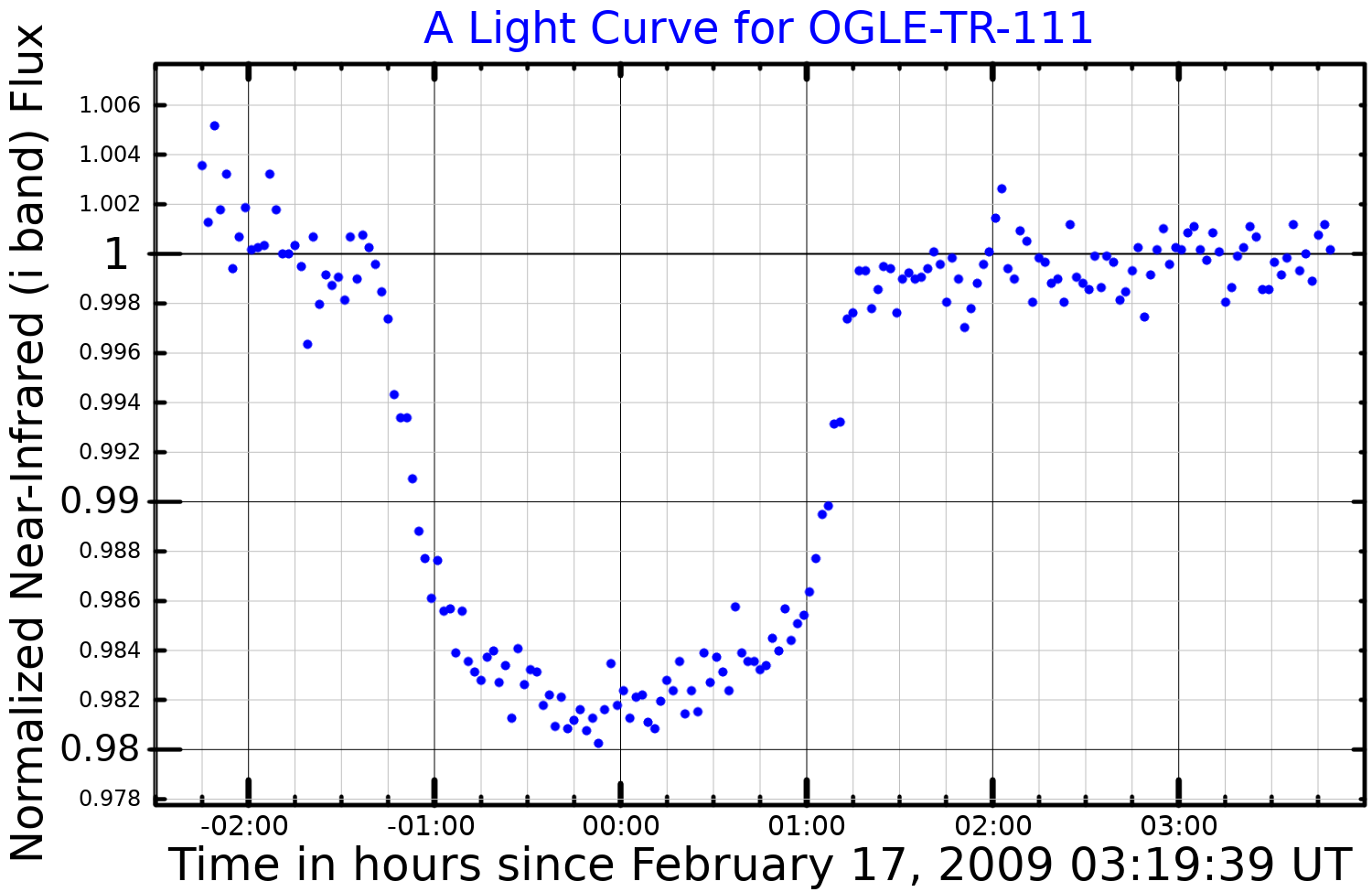
- A light curve showing the February 17, 2009 planet transit across OGLE-TR-111. Adapted from Adams et al. (2010)

Observation data Epoch J2000.0 Equinox ICRS
- Constellation: Carina
- Right ascension: 10^{h} 53^{m} 17.81^{s}
- Declination: −61° 24′ 20.6″
- Apparent magnitude (V): 16.96 - 16.98

Characteristics
- Evolutionary stage: main sequence
- Spectral type: K
- Variable type: planetary transit

Astrometry
Proper motion (μ)	RA: −8.952 mas/yr Dec.: +6.216 mas/yr
Parallax (π)	0.8978±0.0407 mas
Distance	3,600 ± 200 ly (1,110 ± 50 pc)
Absolute magnitude (M_{V})	+6.82

Details
Mass	0.82±0.15 M_{☉}
Radius	0.831±0.031 R_{☉}
Luminosity	0.4 L_{☉}
Surface gravity (log g)	4.12 cgs
Temperature	4,856 K
Metallicity [Fe/H]	0.21 dex
Rotational velocity (v sin i)	5.0 km/s
Age	6.6 Gyr

Other designations
- OGLE-TR-111, V759 Carinae

Database references
SIMBAD	data

OGLE-TR-111 is a yellow dwarf star approximately 3,600 light-years away in the constellation of Carina (the Keel) with an apparent magnitude of about 17. Because its apparent brightness changes when one of its planets transits, the star has been given the variable star designation V759 Carinae.

== Planetary system ==
In 2002 the Optical Gravitational Lensing Experiment (OGLE) survey detected that the light from the star periodically dimmed very slightly every 4 days, indicating a planet-sized body transiting the star. But since the mass of the object had not been measured, it was not clear that it was a true planet, low-mass red dwarf or something else. In 2004 radial velocity measurements showed unambiguously that the transiting body is indeed a planet.

The planet is probably very similar to the other "hot Jupiters" orbiting nearby stars. Its mass is about half that of Jupiter and it orbits the star at a distance less than 1/20th that of Earth from the Sun.

=== Unconfirmed planet candidate ===
In 2005, evidence of another transit was announced. Planet "OGLE-TR-111c" is a possible extrasolar planet orbiting the star. It was first proposed in 2005 based on preliminary evidence from the Optical Gravitational Lensing Experiment (OGLE) survey. More data is required to confirm this planet candidate. If it is confirmed, OGLE-TR-111 would become one of the first stars with a pair of transiting planets.

The OGLE-TR-111 planetary system
Companion (in order from star)	Mass	Semimajor axis (AU)	Orbital period (days)	Eccentricity	Inclination (°)	Radius
b	0.53 ± 0.11 M_{J}	0.047 ± 0.001	4.0144479 ± 4.1e-06	0	—	—
c (unconfirmed)	0.7 ± 0.2 M_{J}	0.12 ± 0.01	16.0644 ± 0.0050	0	—	—

== See also ==
- OGLE-2005-BLG-390L
- List of extrasolar planets
