= RoboNet =

Network of robotic telescopes

RoboNet-1.0 was a prototype global network of UK-built 2-metre robotic telescopes, the largest of their kind in the world, comprising the Liverpool Telescope on La Palma (Canary Islands), the Faulkes Telescope North on Maui (Hawaii), and the Faulkes Telescope South in Australia, managed by a consortium of ten UK universities under the lead of Liverpool John Moores University. For the technological aims of integrating a global network to act effectively as a single instrument, and maximizing the scientific return by applying the newest developments in e-Science, RoboNet adopted the intelligent-agent architecture devised and maintained by the eSTAR project.

With the flexible scheduling and short response time of robotic telescopes being ideal for time-domain astronomy, RoboNet-1.0 had two major science goals that critically depend on these requirements: the determination of origin and nature of gamma-ray bursts, and the detection of cool extra-solar planets by means of gravitational microlensing.

Apart from their science use, the telescopes forming the RoboNet-1.0 have also been made available for two educational programmes, the Faulkes Telescope Project and the National Schools‘ Observatory.

The RoboNet microlensing programme, led by the University of St Andrews, engages in a common campaign with the PLANET collaboration since 2005.

With the official end of RoboNet-1.0 in October 2007, and the earlier acquisition of the two Faulkes Telescopes by Las Cumbres Observatory Global Telescope Network, the microlensing programme is carried on as RoboNet-II. Starting in 2008, RoboNet-II has been using the expert system for microlensing anomaly detection that is being provided by the Automated Robotic Terrestrial Exoplanet Microlensing Search (ARTEMiS). RoboNet-II aims at obtaining a first census of cool terrestrial exoplanets.

== Research highlights ==
RoboNet data have contributed to the detection of several extra-solar planets (in the order of announcement of their discovery)

- OGLE-2005-BLG-071Lb
- OGLE-2005-BLG-390Lb (the most Earth-like planet at the time of its discovery)
- OGLE-2005-BLG-169Lb
- OGLE-2006-BLG-109Lb and OGLE-2006-BLG-109Lc (a pair similar to Jupiter and Saturn in the Solar System)
- OGLE-2007-BLG-368Lb a cold Neptune-Mass planet
- MOA-2009-BLG-319Lb a massive planet orbiting an M dwarf
- MOA-2009-BLG-387Lb
- MOA-2009-BLG-266Lb a cold, ~10 Earth Mass planet
