= ESTAR project =

Software for robotic telescopes

The eSTAR project was a multi-agent system that aimed to implement a heterogeneous network of robotic telescopes for automated observing, and ground-based follow-up to transient events. The project is a joint collaboration between the Astrophysics Group of the University of Exeter and the Astrophysics Research Institute at Liverpool John Moores University. The project was led by Alasdair Allan and Tim Naylor at the University of Exeter, and Iain Steele at Liverpool John Moores University. The eSTAR Project was affiliated with the RoboNet Consortium, and the global Heterogeneous Telescope Networks Consortium.

Begun in 2001, the project was part of the virtual observatory. By 2006 the project was running autonomous software agent for observations of variable stars implementing the optimal sampling techniques of Saunders et al. (2006), and the prototype was successfully tested on the RoboNet network of telescopes which includes: the Liverpool Telescope, the Faulkes Telescope North and the Faulkes Telescope South.

By 2007 the eSTAR Project was "live" supporting two real-time observing projects.

The first was automated follow-up observations of gamma-ray bursts performed using the 3.8m United Kingdom Infrared Telescope (UKIRT) operated by Joint Astronomy Centre in Hawaii (JACH). The first ground based observations of GRB 090423 were triggered via the eSTAR Project, with initial observations by the Swift Gamma-Ray Burst Mission automatically followed by UKIRT just a few minutes after the initial observation by the SWIFT satellite. The observations autonomously triggered by the eSTAR software were reported in Tanvir et al. This gamma-ray burst was, at the time of discovery, the most distant object then known in the Universe.

The second project was the search for extra-solar planets by placing observations on the RoboNet system of telescopes on behalf of the PLANET collaboration. The technique of gravitational microlensing is used to monitor large numbers of stars in the galactic bulge looking for the tell-tale signature of cool planets orbiting those stars.

The project also operated the heaviest used of the initial generation of Virtual Observatory VOEvent brokers, exposing its real-time alert system to other collaborators, like the TALONS Project.

In 2009 the project lost funding and was shuttered.
