= VOEvent =

Astronomical software for reporting observation events

VOEvent is a standardized language used to report observations of astronomical events; it was officially adopted in 2006 by the International Virtual Observatory Alliance (IVOA). Though most VOEvent messages currently issued are related to supernovae, gravitational microlensing, and gamma-ray bursts, they are intended to be general enough to describe all types of observations of astronomical events, including gravitational wave events. Messages are written in XML, providing a structured metadata description of both the observations and the inferences derived from those observations. The rapid dissemination of event data with a formalized language was the original impetus for the creation of VOEvents and the network (now called VOEventNet) used to transport the messages; indeed VOEvent messages are designed to be compact and quickly transmittable over the internet. The VOEvent language (which is codified in an XML schema) continues to evolve; the latest version is 2.0.

== History ==
VOEvent builds upon previous generic publishing schemes such as International Astronomical Union Central Bureau for Astronomical Telegrams (IAUCs and CBETs) and the Astronomer's Telegrams (ATELs). The principal difference is that VOEvent messages are intended to be automatically parsed and filtered whereas ATELs and IAUCs are intended to be read by humans. The scope of VOEvent is informed by several other messaging schemes used to facilitate rapid discovery announcements for specialized sub-fields of astronomy (such as OGLE microlensing alerts and Supernova Early Warning System). The closest ancestors of VOEvent are The Telescope Alert Operation Network System (TALON) and the Gamma Ray Burst Coordinates Network (GCN) messages, used extensively by the gamma-ray burst community.

The first live VOEvent alert messages of real astronomical events were published through a feed from a broker written and maintained the eSTAR Project. Until it was shuttered in 2009 the project maintained a message broker peered with TALON, and provided the first VOEvent-native feed for GCN messages.

== Structure of the Language ==
A typical VOEvent message contains the following tags:

- <who> - describing who is responsible (the author and the publisher) for the information contained in the message
- <how> - a description of the instrumental setup on where the data were obtained
- <what> - the data (such as source flux) associated with the observations of the event
- <why> - inferences about the nature of the event
- <wherewhen> - description of the time and place where the event was recorded. This draws from the Space-time Coordinate (STC) recommendation to the IVOA.

A well-formed VOEvent message must validate against the VOEvent-v2.0 schema (.xsd). A valid message may omit most of the informational tags listed above, but since the creation of VOEvent messages is done automatically, most opt to transmit the fullest content available.

The standard was written by Rob Seaman, Roy Williams, Alasdair Allan, Scott Barthelmy, Joshua Bloom, John Brewer, Robert Denny, Mike Fitzpatrick, Matthew Graham, Norman Gray, Frederic Hessman, Szabolcs Marka, Arnold Rots, Tom Vestrand and Przemyslaw Wozniak.

== Current uses ==
As with most products of the Virtual Observatory, there are no promises that once a VOEvent message has been issued, it will persist indefinitely. It is the role of the publisher, generally, to maintain and curate VOEvents issued. Still, public VOEvent messages may be distributed and or archived through 3rd parties.

=== VOEvent Software ===
- Dakota tools on SourceForge
- Comet, a complete VOEvent transport system
- voevent-parse, VOEvent parsing and manipulation routines for Python

=== VOEvent feeds ===
There are live VOEvent feeds (through a variety of protocols, such as RSS and XMPP) currently available from:

- DC-3 Dreams, SP
- The 4PiSky project at the University of Oxford.
- Gamma-ray burst Coordinates Network (GCN) servers at Goddard Space Flight Center, NASA.

=== Vizualizations ===
Since VOEvents note the location and time events, it is possible to convert streams of events into temporal or spatial visualisations. Skyalert has Worldwide Telescope views of the event sky. eStar hosts an AJAX mashup of microlensing events.
