= OGLE-2016-BLG-1195Lb =

Frigid super-Earth orbiting OGLE-2016-BLG-1195L

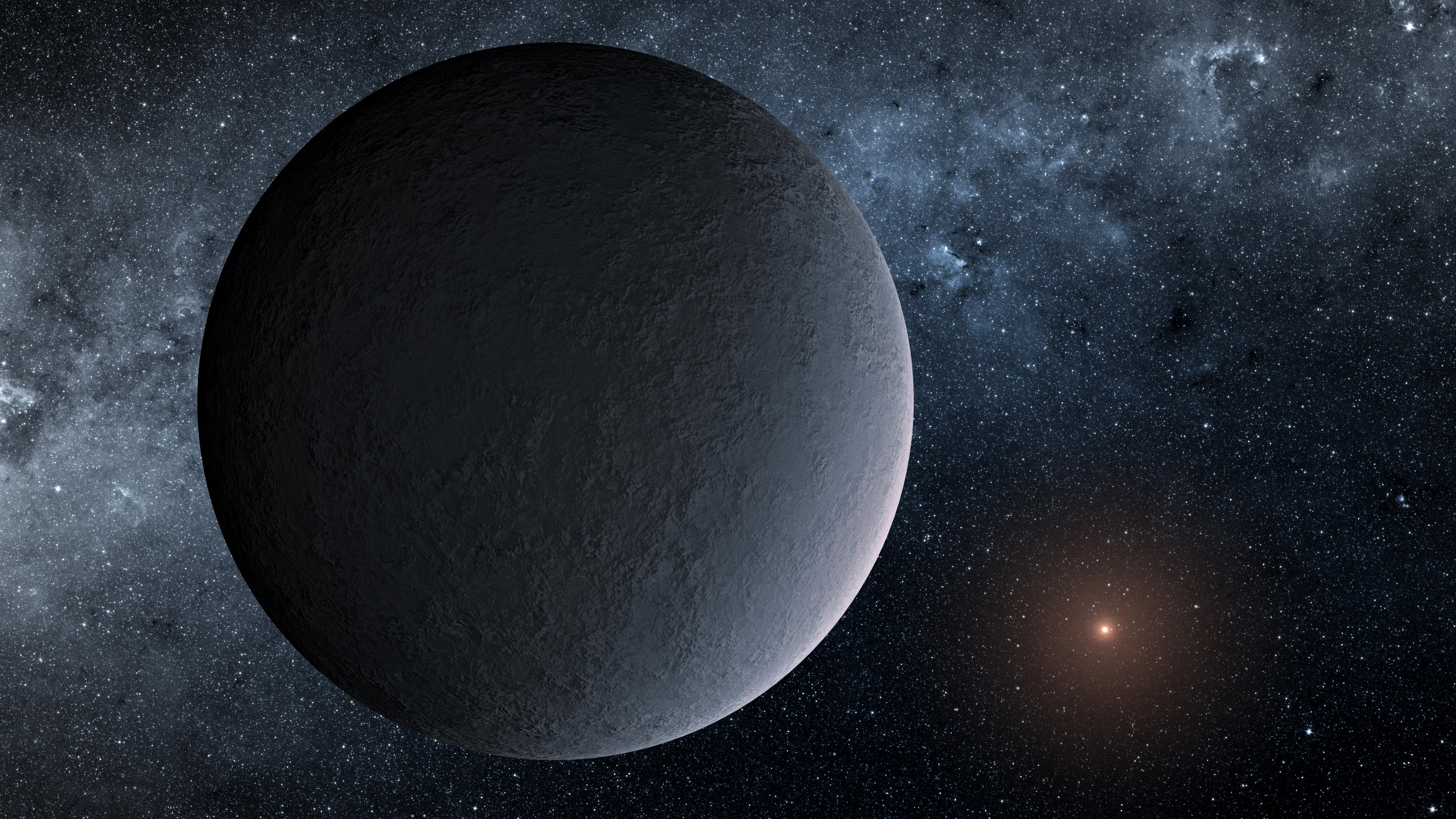
- (obsolete image) Icy Earth-like exoplanet about the same distance from its host star as the Earth is to the Sun (artist concept).

Discovery
- Discovery site: Korea Astronomy and Space Science Institute and Spitzer Space Telescope
- Discovery date: 2017
- Detection method: Gravitational microlensing

Orbital characteristics
- Semi-major axis: 2.62±0.28
- Star: OGLE-2016-BLG-1195L

Physical characteristics
- Mass: 9.91±1.61 M_{🜨}

OGLE-2016-BLG-1195Lb is an extrasolar planet located about 22,000 light-years from Earth, in the galactic bulge, orbiting the 0.57±0.06 M_{☉} star OGLE-2016-BLG-1195L, discovered in 2017. The planet was detected using gravitational microlensing techniques managed by the Korea Astronomy and Space Science Institute and the Spitzer Space Telescope. Initially, it was believed the planet has a mass similar to Earth and is located about the same distance from its host star as the Earth is from the Sun, although it was expected to be much colder.

In 2023, the planetary mass estimate was significantly increased to 9.91±1.61 M_{🜨}, resulting in it likely being a Neptune-like ice giant planet.

== In popular culture ==
The planet has been referred to as Hoth due to its resemblance (before 2023 parameters update) to the planet with the same name from the Star Wars franchise. A similar exoplanet, OGLE-2005-BLG-390Lb, has also been compared to Hoth, by NASA in this instance.

== See also ==
- Gliese 581c
- Gliese 581g
- OGLE-2005-BLG-169Lb
- OGLE-2005-BLG-390Lb
- OGLE-2016-BLG-1190Lb
- Optical Gravitational Lensing Experiment (OGLE)
- Planetary habitability
