= OGLE2-TR-L9b =

Hot Jupiter

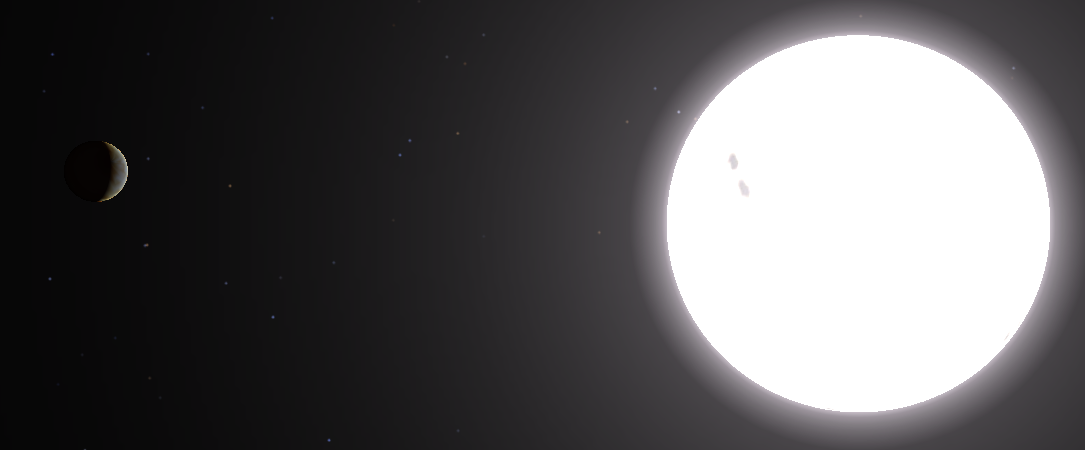
- Artist impression of OGLE2-TR-L9b and its star

Discovery
- Discovered by: Meta de Hoon; Remco van der Burg; Francis Vuijsje
- Discovery date: December 2, 2008
- Detection method: Transit

Orbital characteristics
- Semi-major axis: 0.031 ± 0.001
- Orbital period (sidereal): 2.48553417 ± 0.00000064 d 59.6528 h
- Inclination: 82.19°±0.21°
- Star: OGLE2-TR-L9

Physical characteristics
- Mean radius: 1.958+0.174 −0.111 R_{J}
- Mass: 4.5 ± 1.5 M_{J}
- Mean density: 1.25±0.43 g/cm^{3}
- Temperature: 2,034±22 K

OGLE2-TR-L9b is an extrasolar planet discovered by three undergraduate students from Leiden University, Netherlands. The planet is about 4.5 times as massive as Jupiter and is the first discovered planet orbiting a fast-rotating hot star.

Initially discovered while testing a method for investigating light fluctuations in the OGLE database, the planet's existence was later confirmed by follow-up observations from the ESO's Very Large Telescope in Chile.

== See also ==
- Optical Gravitational Lensing Experiment OGLE
- OGLE-TR-113b
- OGLE-TR-10b
- OGLE-TR-111b
- OGLE-TR-56b
