= OGLE-TR-10 =

Star in the constellation Sagittarius

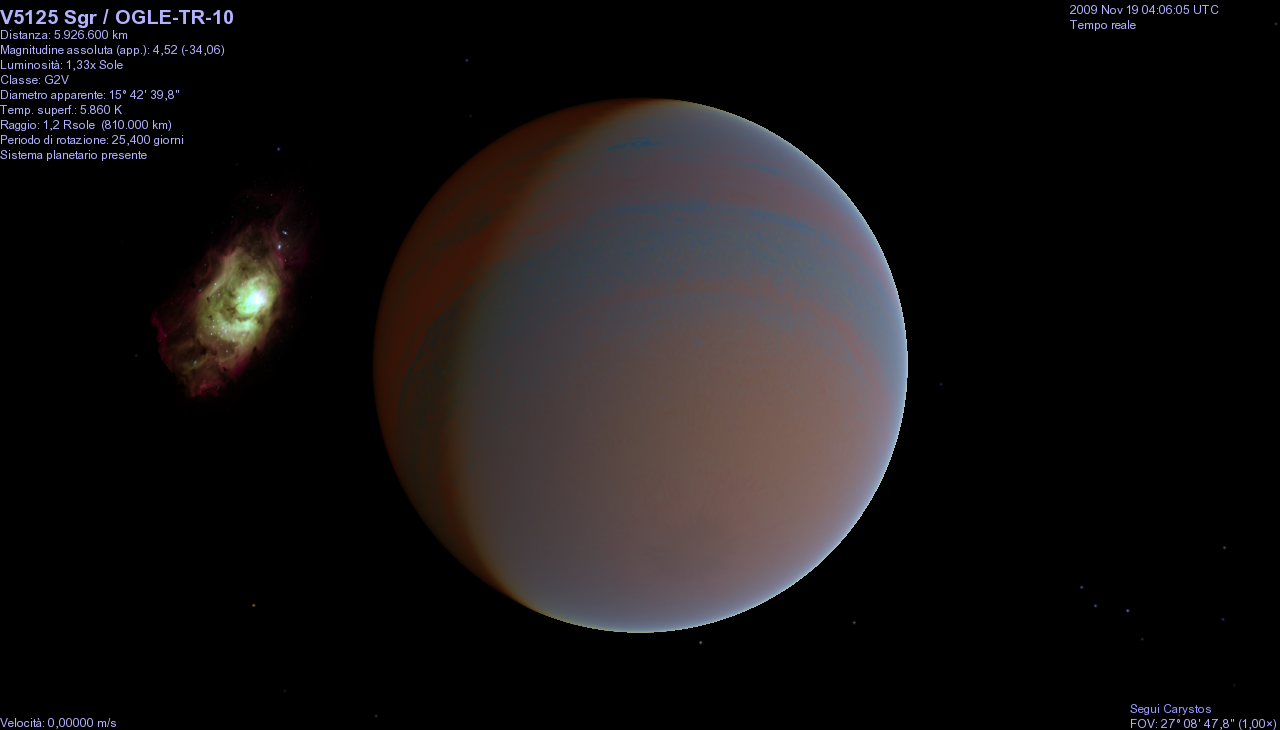
- Artist's impression of the planetary system OGLE-TR-10.

Observation data Epoch J2000.0 Equinox ICRS
- Constellation: Sagittarius
- Right ascension: 17^{h} 51^{m} 28.2594^{s}
- Declination: −29° 52′ 35.231″
- Apparent magnitude (V): 15.780

Characteristics
- Spectral type: G2V
- Apparent magnitude (V): 15.780
- Apparent magnitude (I): 14.92
- Variable type: planetary transit variable

Astrometry
Proper motion (μ)	RA: 0.208(63) mas/yr Dec.: −5.284(40) mas/yr
Parallax (π)	0.8016±0.0394 mas
Distance	4,100 ± 200 ly (1,250 ± 60 pc)
Absolute magnitude (M_{V})	4.32

Details
Mass	1.14 M_{☉}
Radius	1.24 R_{☉}
Luminosity	1.89 L_{☉}
Surface gravity (log g)	4.31 cgs
Temperature	6,075 K
Metallicity [Fe/H]	0.28 dex
Rotational velocity (v sin i)	6.4 km/s
Age	2.0 Gyr

Other designations
- V5125 Sagittarii, SBC9 2452

Database references
SIMBAD	data

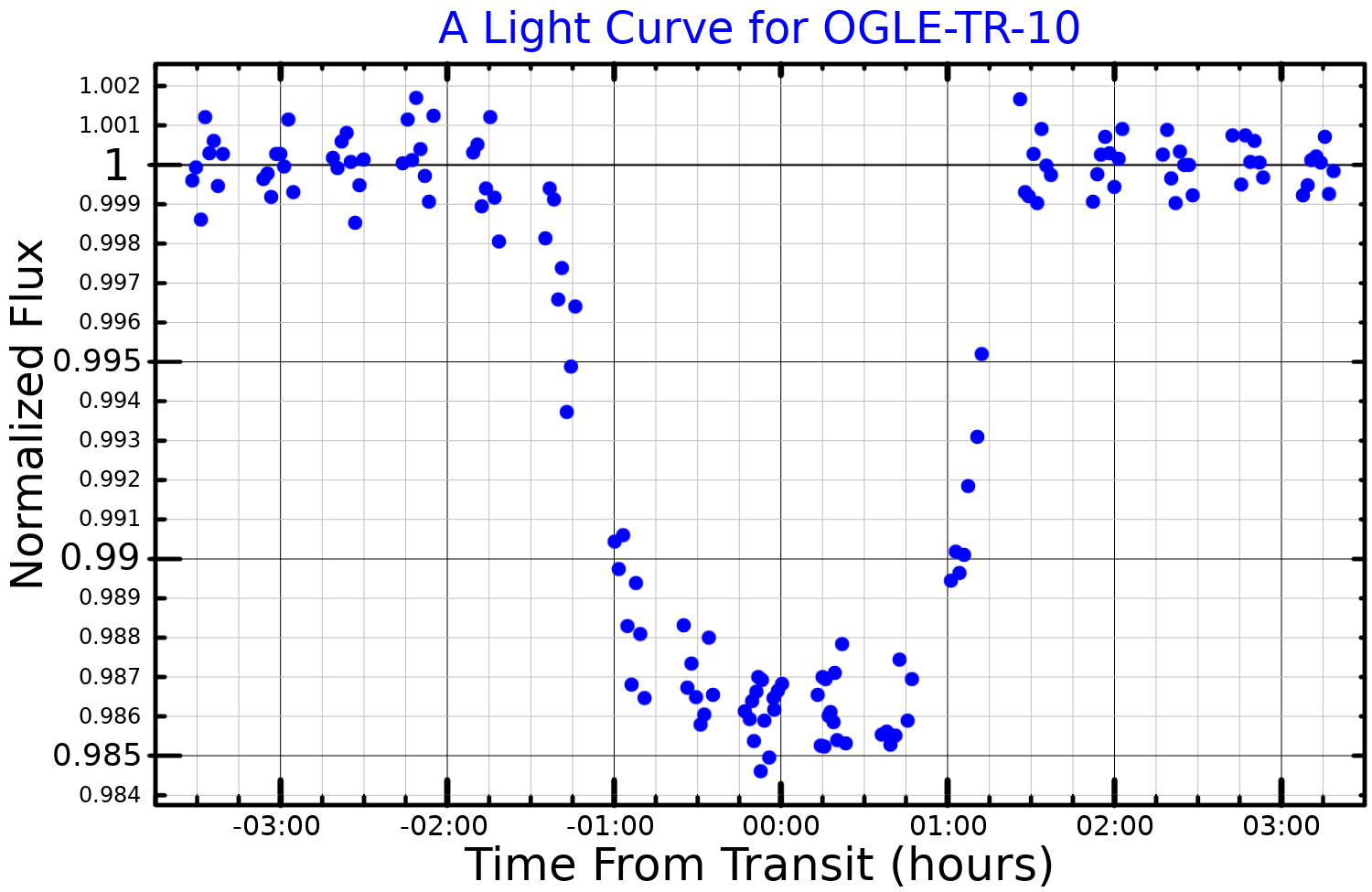
A light curve for OGLE-TR-10 showing the planet transit, adapted from Pont et al. (2007)

OGLE-TR-10 is a distant G-type main sequence star located 4100 light years from Earth in the constellation of Sagittarius. It is located near the Galactic Center. This star is listed as an eclipsing type variable star with the eclipse due to the passage of the planet as noted in the discovery papers. The eclipses were detected by the Optical Gravitational Lensing Experiment (OGLE) team analysing data collected in 2001.

== Planetary system ==
This star is home to OGLE-TR-10b, a transiting planet found by the Optical Gravitational Lensing Experiment (OGLE) survey in 2002.

The OGLE-TR-10 planetary system
Companion (in order from star)	Mass	Semimajor axis (AU)	Orbital period (days)	Eccentricity	Inclination (°)	Radius
b	0.63 ±0.14 M_{J}	0.04162 ±0.00004	3.10129 ±0.00001	0	—	—

== See also ==
- List of extrasolar planets
