= OGLE2-TR-L9 =

Star in the constellation Carina

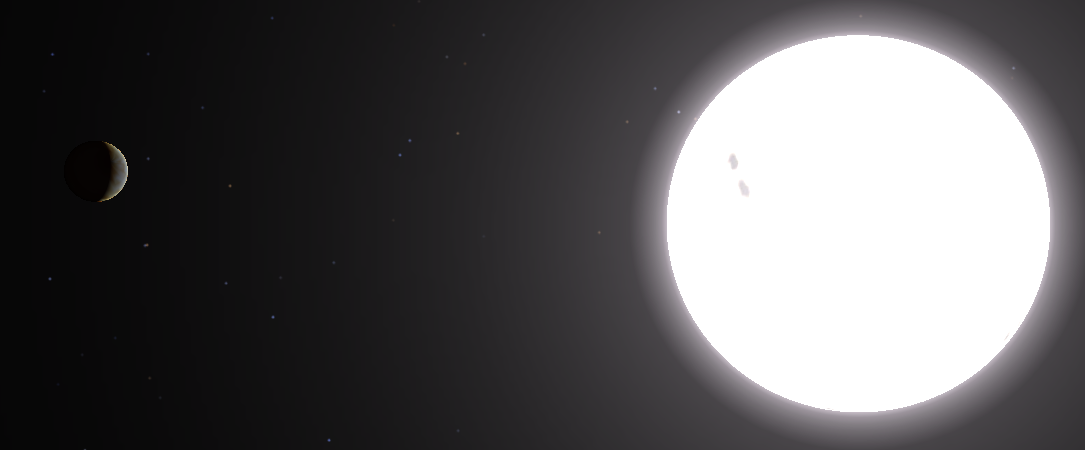
- Artistic rendering of OGLE2-TR-L9 and its planet

Observation data Epoch J2000.0 Equinox ICRS
- Constellation: Carina
- Right ascension: 11^{h} 07^{m} 55.181^{s}
- Declination: −61° 08′ 46.54″
- Apparent magnitude (V): 14.74

Characteristics
- Evolutionary stage: main sequence
- Spectral type: F3V
- Apparent magnitude (R): 14.74
- Apparent magnitude (I): 14.00
- Apparent magnitude (J): 13.51
- Apparent magnitude (H): 13.25
- Apparent magnitude (K): 13.12

Astrometry
Proper motion (μ)	RA: −4.577 mas/yr Dec.: +2.518 mas/yr
Parallax (π)	0.6262±0.0168 mas
Distance	5,200 ± 100 ly (1,600 ± 40 pc)

Details
Mass	1.52±0.08 M_{☉}
Radius	1.53±0.04 R_{☉}
Temperature	6,933±58 K
Age	660 million years

Other designations
- 2MASS J11075518-6108465, OGLE-II CAR-SC2 75679, DENIS-P J110755.1-610846, UCAC2 4790820

Database references
SIMBAD	data

OGLE2-TR-L9 is a magnitude 15 star in the constellation Carina at a distance of approximately 5,142 light years.

== Planetary system ==
This star is home to the transiting extrasolar planet OGLE2-TR-L9b discovered in 2008.

The OGLE2-TR-L9 planetary system
Companion (in order from star)	Mass	Semimajor axis (AU)	Orbital period (days)	Eccentricity	Inclination (°)	Radius
b	4.5±1.5 M_{J}	0.0308	2.4855335(7)	0	—	—

== See also ==
- List of extrasolar planets
- Optical Gravitational Lensing Experiment OGLE
