= OGLE-TR-211b =

Inflated hot Jupiter

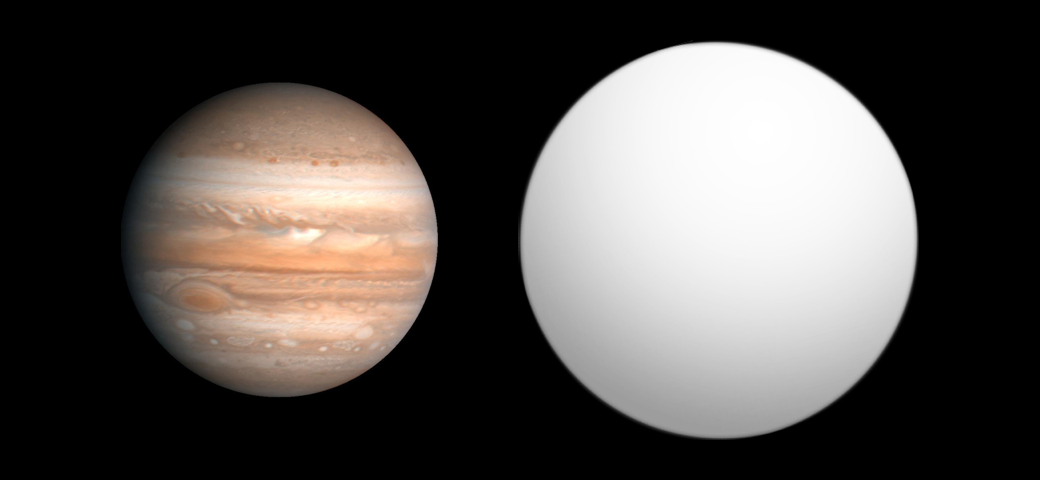
- Size comparison of OGLE-TR-211b with Jupiter.

Discovery
- Discovered by: Udalski, Pont et al. (OGLE)
- Discovery site: Chile
- Discovery date: November 27, 2007
- Detection method: transit

Orbital characteristics
- Apastron: 0.051 AU (7,600,000 km)
- Periastron: 0.051 AU (7,600,000 km)
- Semi-major axis: 0.051 ± 0.001 AU (7,630,000 ± 150,000 km)
- Eccentricity: 0
- Orbital period (sidereal): 3.67724 ± 3e-5 d 0.0100676 y
- Average orbital speed: 150
- Inclination: >87.2
- Time of periastron: 2453428.334
- Argument of periastron: ?
- Semi-amplitude: 290
- Star: OGLE-TR-211

Physical characteristics
- Mean radius: 1.36^{+0.18}_{−0.09} R_{J}
- Mass: 1.03 ± 0.2 M_{J}

OGLE-TR-211b is a transiting planet in the constellation Carina. Its radius is about 36% more than Jupiter and has mass 3% more than Jupiter, which is considered an “inflated Hot Jupiter”. The planet takes 3.7 days at about the same distance as 51 Pegasi b orbits around 51 Pegasi.

== See also ==
- OGLE-TR-182b
- Optical Gravitational Lensing Experiment OGLE
