= OGLE-2018-BLG-0799Lb =

Sub-Saturn exoplanet orbiting OGLE-2018-BLG-0799L

Discovery
- Discovery site: OGLE
- Discovery date: October 2020 (published August 2022)
- Detection method: Gravitional Microlensing

Orbital characteristics
- Semi-major axis: 1.38+0.61 −0.31

Physical characteristics
- Mass: 0.22 M_{J}

OGLE-2018-BLG-0799Lb is a sub-Saturn-mass exoplanet discovered by the Optical Gravitational Lensing Experiment (OGLE) collaboration, through a gravitational microlensing event that occurred in May 2018. The discovery was announced in October 2020, and published in August 2022.

It has a mass of 0.22 Jupiter masses and is 14,400 light years away from earth. It orbits a dwarf star of approximately 0.08 solar masses.
