= OGLE-TR-132 =

Star in the constellation Carina

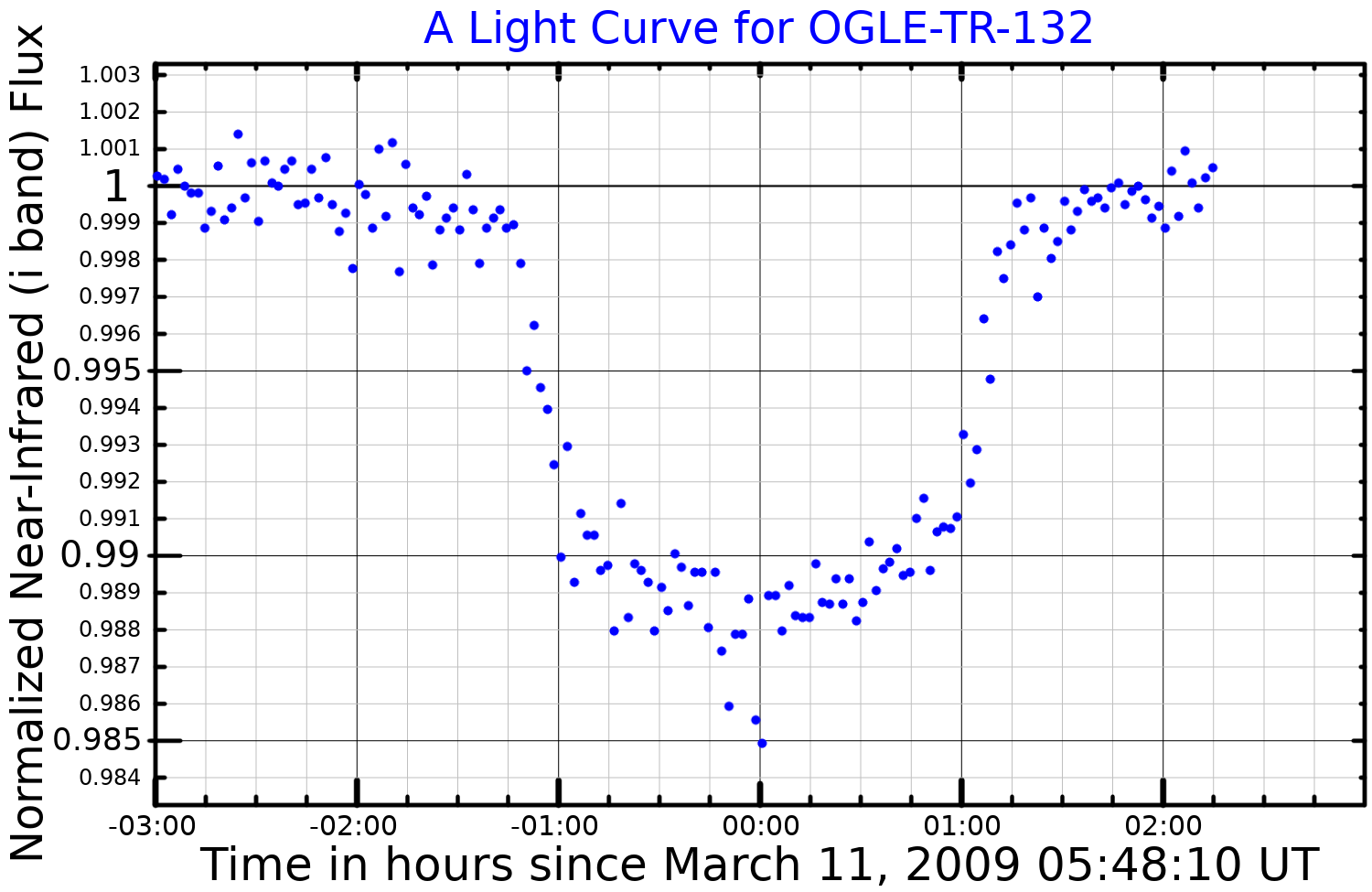
- Light curve showing the March 11, 2009 planet transit across OGLE-TR-132; Credit: Adapted from Adams et al. (2011)

Observation data Epoch J2000.0 Equinox ICRS
- Constellation: Carina
- Right ascension: 10^{h} 50^{m} 34.59^{s}
- Declination: −61° 57′ 26.1″
- Apparent magnitude (V): 15.72

Characteristics
- Evolutionary stage: subgiant
- Spectral type: F

Astrometry
Proper motion (μ)	RA: −5.463 mas/yr Dec.: +3.058 mas/yr
Parallax (π)	0.4290±0.0450 mas
Distance	approx. 7,600 ly (approx. 2,300 pc)

Details
Mass	1.19 M_{☉}
Radius	1.23 R_{☉}
Luminosity	2.04 L_{☉}
Surface gravity (log g)	4.33 cgs
Temperature	6,210 K
Age	7.4 Gyr

Other designations
- V742 Carinae, TIC 465144510

Database references
SIMBAD	data

OGLE-TR-132 is a distant magnitude-15.72 star in the star fields of the constellation Carina. Because of its great distance, about 4,900 light-years, and location in the crowded field it was not notable in any way. Because its apparent brightness changes when one of its planets transits, the star has been given the variable star designation V742 Carinae. The spectral type of the star is type F. A yellow-white, very metal-rich subgiant, it is slightly hotter and more luminous than the Sun.

== Planetary system ==
In 2003 the Optical Gravitational Lensing Experiment (OGLE) detected periodic dimming in the star's light curve indicating a transiting, planetary-sized object. Since low-mass red dwarfs and brown dwarfs may mimic a planet radial velocity measurements were necessary to calculate the mass of the body. In 2004 the object was proved to be a new transiting extrasolar planet, OGLE-TR-132b.

The OGLE-TR-132 planetary system
Companion (in order from star)	Mass	Semimajor axis (AU)	Orbital period (days)	Eccentricity	Inclination (°)	Radius
b	1.14 ± 0.12 M_{J}	0.0306 ± 0.0008	1.689868 ± 0.000003	0	—	1.15+0.80 −0.13 R_{J}

== See also ==
- Optical Gravitational Lensing Experiment
- OGLE-TR-113
- Lists of exoplanets
