= OGLE-2006-BLG-109Lc =

Saturn-sized planet orbiting OGLE-2006-BLG-109L

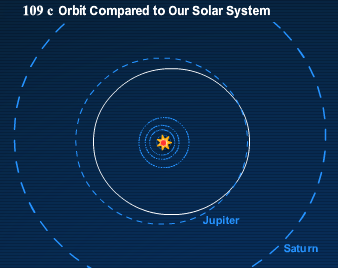
- OGLE-2006-BLG-109 c's orbit compared to Jupiter's orbit (5.2AU) in the Solar System.

Discovery
- Discovered by: Gaudi and Bennett et al.
- Discovery date: 14 February 2008
- Detection method: Gravitational microlensing

Orbital characteristics
- Semi-major axis: 4.5 AU
- Eccentricity: 0.15
- Orbital period (sidereal): 4931 ± 1750 d 13.5 ± 4.79 y
- Inclination: 64 ± 8
- Star: OGLE-2006-BLG-109L

Physical characteristics
- Mean radius: 0.994 R_{J} (11.42 R_{🜨}) (estimate)
- Mass: 0.27 M_{J} (85.8 M_{🜨})
- Temperature: 59 ± 7

OGLE-2006-BLG-109Lc is an extrasolar planet approximately 4,925 light-years away in the constellation of Scorpius. The planet was detected orbiting the star OGLE-2006-BLG-109L in 2008 by a research team using Microlensing. The host star is about 50% the mass of the Sun and the planet is about 90% the mass of Saturn.

== See also ==
- Optical Gravitational Lensing Experiment or OGLE
- 47 Ursae Majoris b
- OGLE-2005-BLG-390Lb
- OGLE-2006-BLG-109Lb
