= OGLE-2005-BLG-169L =

Star in the constellation Sagittarius

Observation data Epoch J2000.0 Equinox J2000.0
- Constellation: Sagittarius
- Right ascension: 18^{h} 06^{m} 05.32^{s}
- Declination: −30° 43′ 57.5″
- Apparent magnitude (V): +20.4

Characteristics
- Spectral type: M?

Astrometry
| Distance | 8,800 ly (2,700 pc) |

Details
| Mass | 0.49 M_{☉} |

Other designations
- EWS 2005-BUL-169, EWS 2005-BLG-169

Database references
| SIMBAD | data |

OGLE-2005-BLG-169L is a dim and distant magnitude 20 galactic bulge star located about 2,700 parsecs away in the constellation Sagittarius. If it is a main sequence star, then it is most likely a red dwarf with about half of the mass of the Sun. Other possibilities are a white dwarf star, or (less likely) a neutron star or black hole.

== Planetary system ==
In 2006, an Uranus-mass extrasolar planet was detected by gravitational microlensing around this star.

The OGLE-2005-BLG-169L planetary system
| Companion (in order from star) | Mass | Semimajor axis (AU) | Orbital period (days) | Eccentricity | Inclination (°) | Radius |
|---|---|---|---|---|---|---|
| b | 0.041 M_{J} | 2.7 | ~3300 | — | — | — |

== See also ==
- List of extrasolar planets
- OGLE-2005-BLG-390L
- Optical Gravitational Lensing Experiment or OGLE
