= OGLE-2005-BLG-071L =

Galactic bulge star

Observation data Epoch J2000.0 Equinox J2000.0
- Constellation: Scorpius
- Right ascension: 17^{h} 50^{m} 09.77^{s}
- Declination: –34° 40′ 23.5″
- Apparent magnitude (V): 19.5

Characteristics
- Spectral type: M5

Astrometry
Distance	3,500±300 pc

Details
Mass	0.426±0.037 M_{☉}

Other designations
- EWS 2005-BUL-71, EWS 2005-BLG-71

Database references
SIMBAD	data

OGLE-2005-BLG-071L is a distant, magnitude 19.5 galactic bulge star located in the constellation Scorpius, approximately 11,000 light years away from the Solar System. The star is probably a red dwarf with a mass 43% of that of the Sun.

== Planetary system ==
In 2005 an exoplanet was discovered orbiting this star by the microlensing method, the second planet found by this method. The planet was later confirmed by the Keck telescope and its properties were refined.

The OGLE-2005-BLG-071L planetary system
Companion (in order from star)	Mass	Semimajor axis (AU)	Orbital period (days)	Eccentricity	Inclination	Radius
b	3.8 ^{+0.3}_{−0.4} or 3.4 ± 0.3 M_{J}	3.6 ± 0.2 or 2.1 ± 0.1	—	—	—	—

== See also ==
- List of extrasolar planets
- Optical Gravitational Lensing Experiment or OGLE
