= OGLE-2006-BLG-109Lb =

Jovian planet orbiting OGLE-2006-BLG-109L

Discovery
- Discovered by: Gaudi and Bennett et al.
- Discovery date: 14 February 2008
- Detection method: Gravitational microlensing

Orbital characteristics
- Orbital period (sidereal): 1790 ± 548 d
- Inclination: 64 ± 8
- Star: OGLE-2006-BLG-109L

Physical characteristics
- Mass: 0.727 ± 0.06 M_{J}
- Temperature: ~102

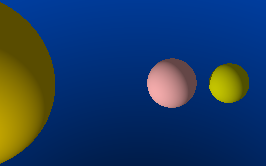
Scheme of OGLE-2006-BLG-109 planetary system created with POV-Ray, based on graphic from Gazeta Wyborcza (15.02.08); please note, that there may be more than two planets. Second version.

OGLE-2006-BLG-109Lb is an extrasolar planet approximately 4,920 light-years away in the constellation of Scorpius. The planet was detected orbiting the star OGLE-2006-BLG-109L in 2008 by a research team using Microlensing.

== See also ==
- Optical Gravitational Lensing Experiment or OGLE
- 47 Ursae Majoris b
- OGLE-2005-BLG-390Lb
- OGLE-2006-BLG-109Lc
