= OGLE-2005-BLG-071Lb =

Gas giant

Discovery
- Discovered by: Udalski et al.
- Discovery date: 27 May 2005
- Detection method: Gravitational microlensing

Orbital characteristics
- Star: OGLE-2005-BLG-071L

Physical characteristics
- Mass: 3.8 ^{+0.3}_{−0.4} or 3.4 ± 0.3 M_{J}

OGLE-2005-BLG-071Lb is a planet discovered by the Optical Gravitational Lensing Experiment (OGLE) and others in 2005, using gravitational microlensing. According to the best fit model, it has about 3.5 times the mass of Jupiter and a projected separation of 3.6 astronomical units from the star. This would result in an effective temperature around 50 K, similar to that of Neptune. However, an alternative model which gives a slightly lower mass of 3.3 times that of Jupiter and a projected separation of 2.1 AU is only slightly less likely. It may be the most massive planet currently known around a red dwarf star (though only lower limits are known for those planets detected by the radial velocity method). It takes the planet 2,900 days (about 7.9 earth years) to complete one full orbit.

== See also ==
- Optical Gravitational Lensing Experiment or OGLE
