= OGLE-2005-BLG-169Lb =

Gas giant exoplanet orbiting OGLE-2005-BLG-169L

Discovery
- Discovered by: MicroFUN, PLANET/RoboNet, OGLE
- Discovery date: 10 March 2006
- Detection method: Gravitational microlensing

Orbital characteristics
- Star: OGLE-2005-BLG-169L

Physical characteristics
- Mass: 13.2±1.3 M_{🜨}
- Temperature: ~70 K

OGLE-2005-BLG-169Lb is an extrasolar planet located approximately 2,700 parsecs (8,800 light-years) away in the constellation of Sagittarius, orbiting the star OGLE-2005-BLG-169L. This planet was discovered by the OGLE project using the gravitational microlensing method. Based on a most likely mass for the host star of 0.49 solar mass (M_{☉}), the planet has a mass of 13 times that of Earth (M_{🜨}). Its mass and estimated temperature are close to those of Uranus. It is speculated that this planet may either be an ice giant like Uranus, or a "naked super-Earth" with a solid icy or rocky surface.

== See also ==
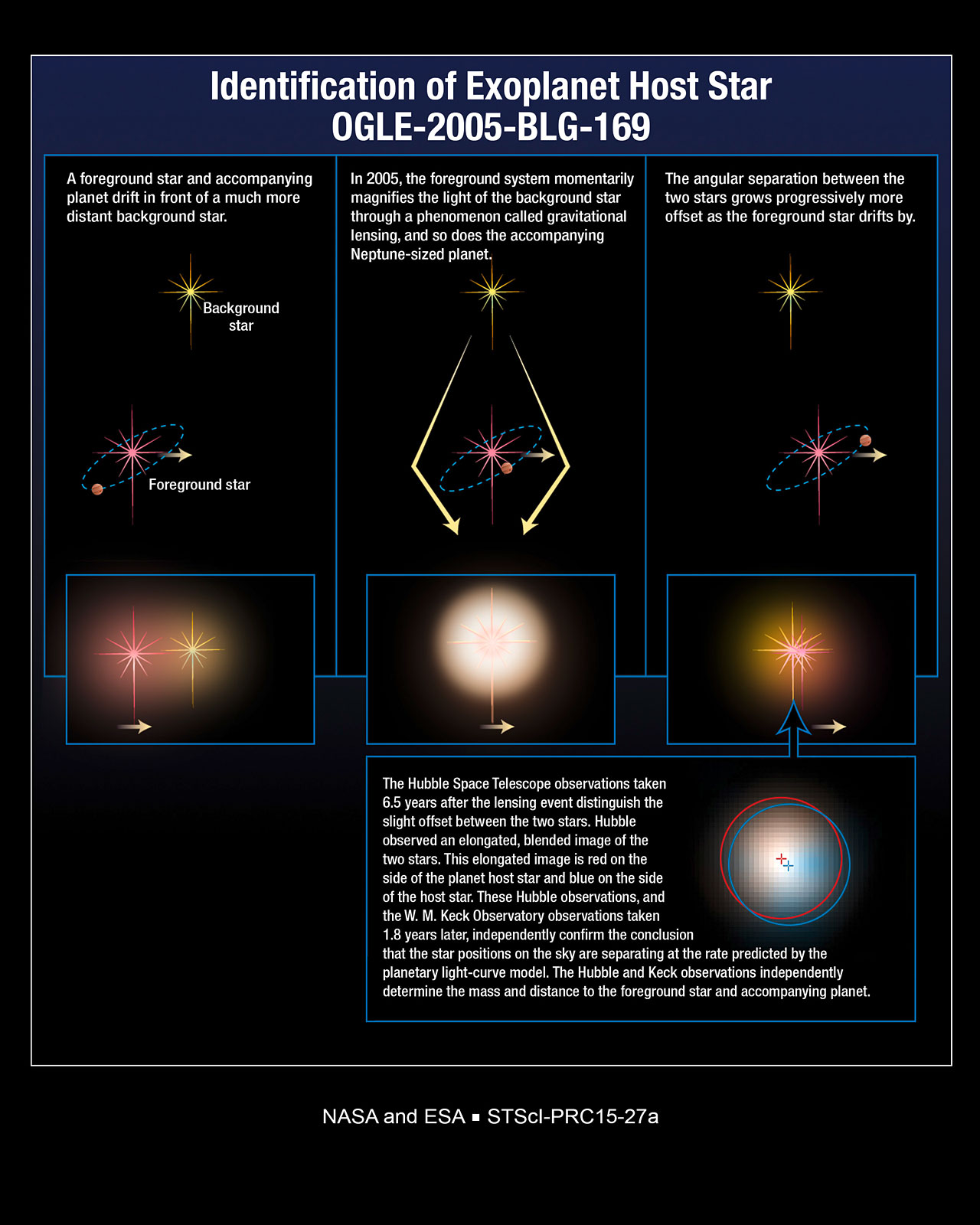
How a star can magnify and brighten the light of a background star when it passes in front of the distant star.

- OGLE-2005-BLG-390Lb
- Optical Gravitational Lensing Experiment (OGLE)
