= OGLE-2005-BLG-390L =

Star in the constellation Scorpius

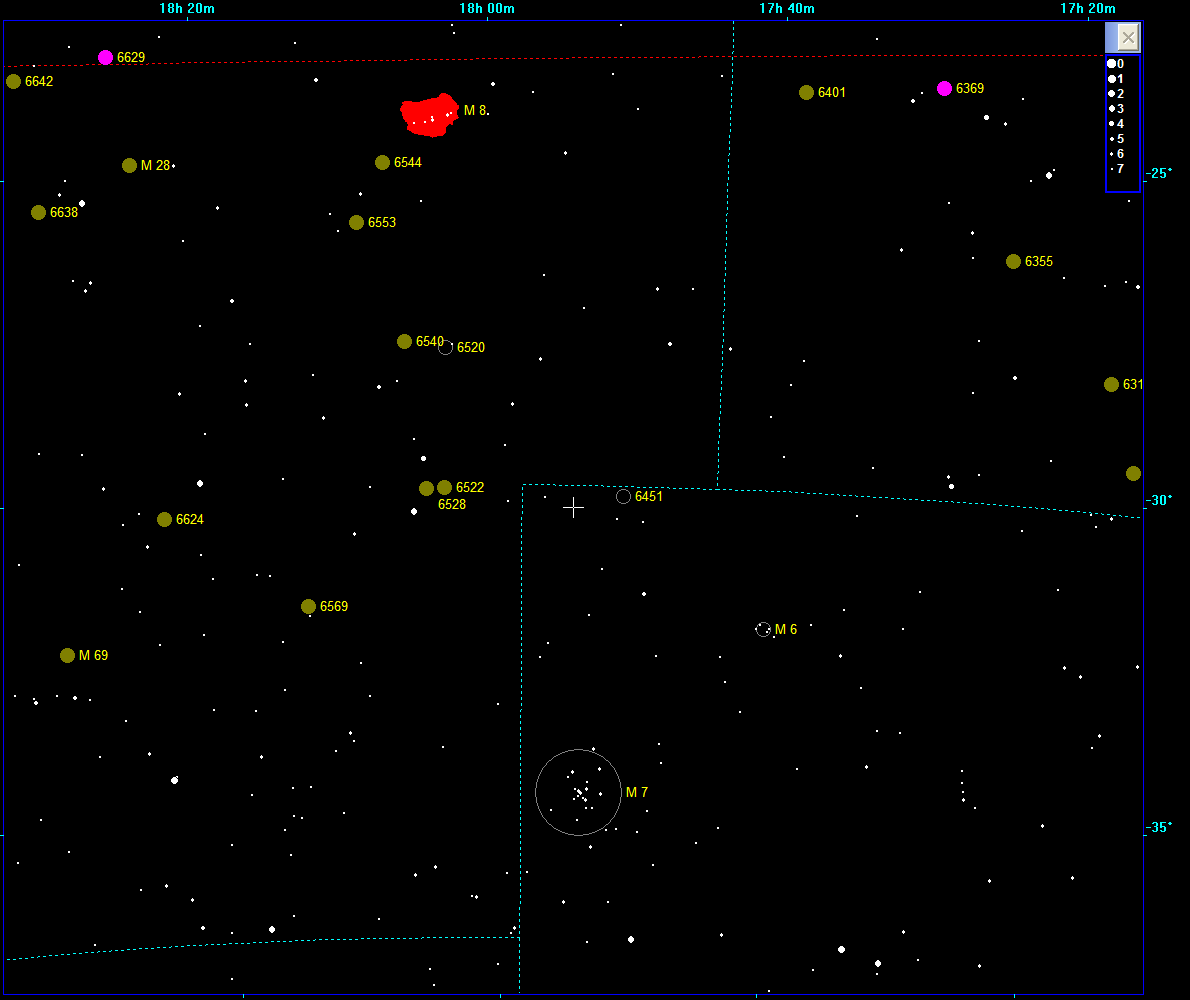
- OGLE-2005-BLG-390L's location in the night sky.

Observation data Epoch J2000.0 Equinox ICRS
- Constellation: Scorpius
- Right ascension: 17^{h} 54^{m} 19.2^{s}
- Declination: −30° 22′ 38″

Characteristics
- Spectral type: M4

Astrometry
Distance	21,500 ±3300 ly (6,600 ±1,000 pc)

Details
Mass	0.22 M_{☉}

Other designations
- EWS 2005-BUL-390, EWS 2005-BLG-390

Database references
SIMBAD	data

OGLE-2005-BLG-390L is a star thought to be a spectral type M (a red dwarf; 95% probability, 4% probability it is a white dwarf, <1% probability it is a neutron star or black hole). This galactic bulge star is located in the constellation Scorpius at a distance of about 21,500 light years, near the border with Sagittarius.

== Planetary system ==
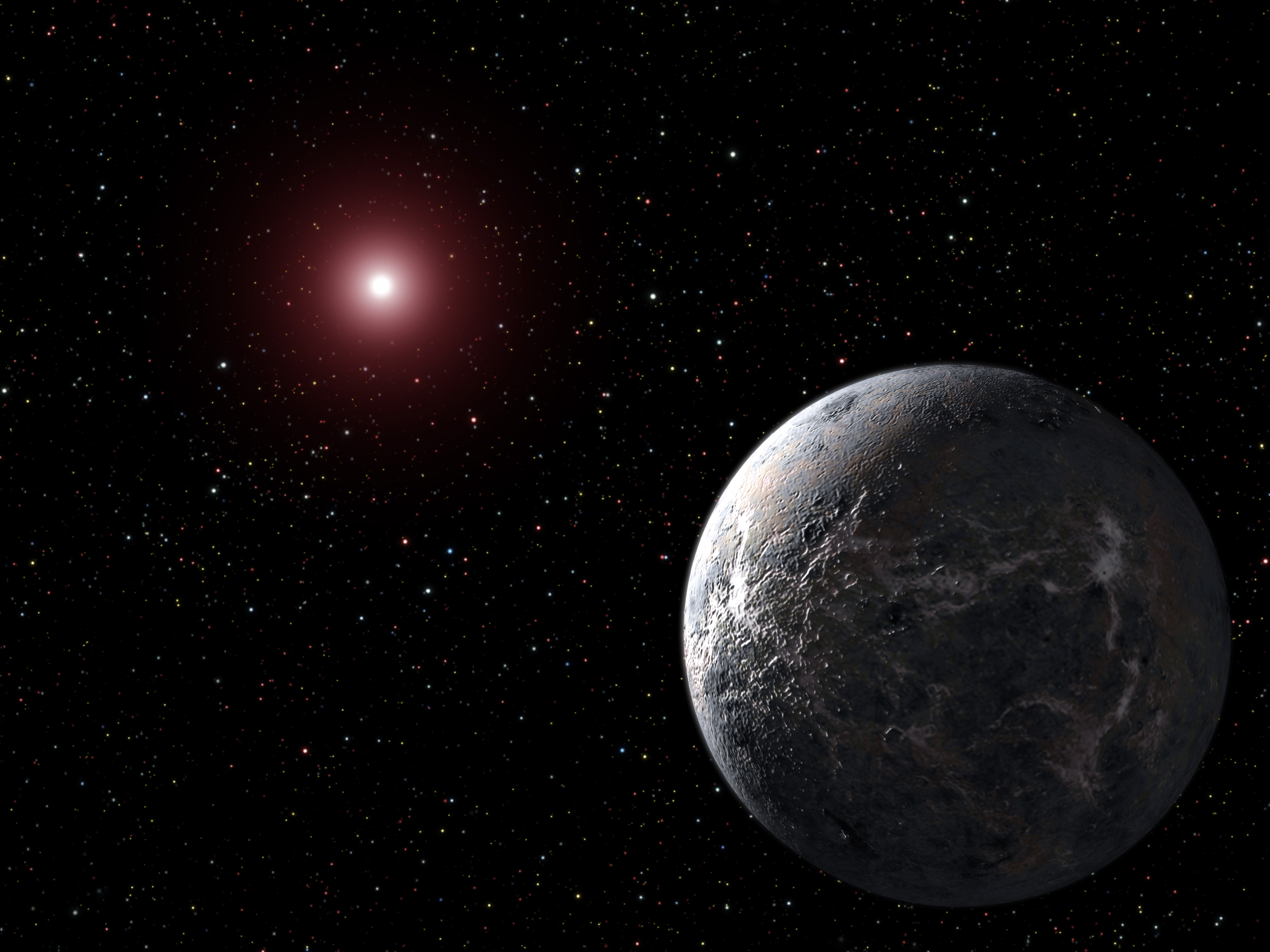
Artist's impression of OGLE-2005-BLG-390Lb.

OGLE-2005-BLG-390L has one known planet, which was discovered using the technique of gravitational microlensing. Indications are that the planet is about five times Earth mass, orbiting at about 2.6 astronomical units from the parent star. The discovery was announced on January 25, 2006. OGLE-2005-BLG-390Lb was once considered one of the smallest known extrasolar planets around a main sequence star, possibly rocky, with a mass around 5.5 times that of the Earth. The orbital radius (assuming a circular orbit) of the planet is 2.6 AU, however the orbital elements are unknown. Based on its low mass and estimated temperature of around 50 K, the planet is thought to consist mainly of ices, like Pluto or Uranus, rather than being a Jupiter-like gas giant.

The OGLE-2005-BLG-390L planetary system
Companion (in order from star)	Mass	Semimajor axis (AU)	Orbital period (years)	Eccentricity	Inclination (°)	Radius
b	5.5 M_{🜨}	2.6	~10	—	—	—

== See also ==
- List of stars with extrasolar planets
- OGLE-2005-BLG-169L
- Optical Gravitational Lensing Experiment (OGLE)
