= Optical Gravitational Lensing Experiment =

Long-term variability sky survey

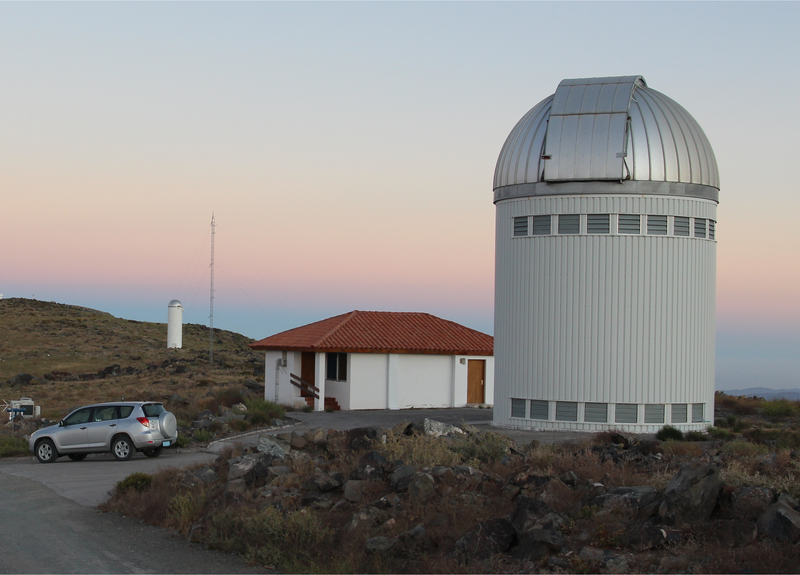
- OGLE telescope at the Las Campanas Observatory
- Alternative names: OGLE
- Coordinates: 29°00′36″S 70°41′56″W
- Website: ogle.astrouw.edu.pl
- Related media on Commons

The Optical Gravitational Lensing Experiment (OGLE) is a Polish astronomical project based at the University of Warsaw that runs a long-term variability sky survey (1992–present). The main goals are the detection and classification of variable stars (pulsating and eclipsing), discovery of microlensing events, dwarf novae, and studies of the structure of the Galaxy and the Magellanic Clouds. Since the project began in 1992, it has discovered a multitude of extrasolar planets, together with the first planet discovered using the transit method (OGLE-TR-56b) and gravitational microlensing. The project has been led by Professor Andrzej Udalski since its inception.

== Description ==
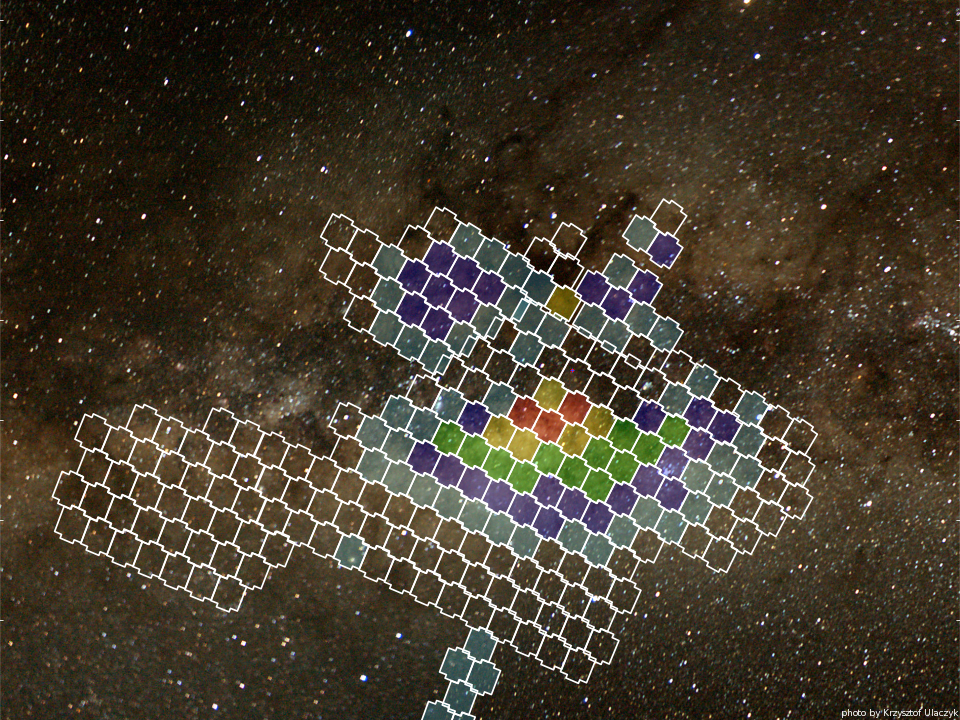
OGLE-IV Galactic Bulge fields with cadence, from OGLE-IV sky coverage.

The main targets of the experiment are the Magellanic Clouds and the Galactic Bulge, because of the large number of intervening stars that can be used for microlensing during a stellar transit. Most of the observations have been made at the Las Campanas Observatory in Chile. Cooperating institutions include Princeton University and the Carnegie Institution.

The project is now in its fourth phase. The first phase, OGLE-I (1992–1995), used the 1.0-metre (3 ft 3 in) Swope telescope and a single-chip CCD sensor. For OGLE-II (1996–2000), a 1.3-metre (4 ft 3 in) telescope dedicated to the project (the Warsaw telescope) was constructed at Las Campanas Observatory. It was equipped with a single 2048×2048 pixel sensor with a field of view 0.237 degrees wide.

OGLE-III (2001–2009) expanded the camera to a mosaic of eight 2048×4096 pixel CCDs, and was able to search for gravitational microlensing events and transiting planets in four fields: the Galactic Bulge, the constellation Carina, and toward both Magellanic Clouds. As a byproduct of the constant monitoring of hundreds of millions of stars, the largest catalogs of variable stars were constructed, and the first exoplanets discovered using the microlensing technique were detected.

In 2010, following engineering work in 2009, the fourth and current phase, OGLE-IV, was started using a 32-chip mosaic CCD camera which fills the Warsaw telescope's 1.5° field of view. The main goal for this phase is to increase the number of planetary detections using microlensing, enabled by the new camera.

Recently the OGLE team, in cooperation with scientists mostly from the US, New Zealand and Japan, proved that small, Earth-like planets can exist at a significant distance from stars around which they revolve despite there being other stars near them.

In January 2022 in collaboration with Microlensing Observations in Astrophysics (MOA) they reported in a preprint the first rogue black hole. While there have been other candidates this is the most solid detection so far as their technique allowed to measure not only the amplification of light but also its deflection by the BH from the microlensing data.

== Planets discovered ==
At least seventeen planets have so far been discovered by the OGLE project. Eight of the planets were discovered by the transit method and six by the gravitational microlensing method.

Planets are shown in the order of discovery. Planets in multiple-planet systems are highlighted in yellow.

Star	Constellation	Right ascension	Declination	App. mag.	Distance (ly)	Spectral type	Planet	Mass (M_{J})	Radius (R_{J})	Orbital period (d)	a (AU)	ecc.	incl. (°)	Discovery year
OGLE-TR-10	Sagittarius	17^{h} 51^{m} 28^{s}	−29° 52′ 34″	15.78	5000	G2V	OGLE-TR-10 b	0.63	1.26	3.10129	0.04162	0	84.5	2002
OGLE-TR-111	Carina	10^{h} 53^{m} 01^{s}	−61° 24′ 20″	16.96	5000	G	OGLE-TR-111 b	0.53	1.0	4.01610	0.047	0	88.1	2002
OGLE-TR-132	Carina	10^{h} 50^{m} 34^{s}	−61° 57′ 25″	15.72	7110	F	OGLE-TR-132 b	1.14	1.18	1.689868	0.0306	0	85	2003
OGLE-TR-56	Sagittarius	17^{h} 56^{m} 35^{s}	−29° 32′ 21″	16.56	4892	G	OGLE-TR-56 b	1.29	1.30	1.211909	0.0225	0	78.8	2003
OGLE-TR-113	Carina	10^{h} 52^{m} 24^{s}	−61° 26′ 48″	16.08	1800	K	OGLE-TR-113 b	1.32	1.09	1.4324757	0.0229	0	89.4	2004
OGLE-2003-BLG-235L /MOA-2003-BLG-53L	Sagittarius	18^{h} 05^{m} 16^{s}	−28° 53′ 42″		19000	K	OGLE-2003-BLG-235Lb	2.6			4.3			2004
OGLE-2005-BLG-071L	Scorpius	17^{h} 50^{m} 09^{s}	−34° 40′ 23″	19.5	9500	M	OGLE-2005-BLG-071Lb	3.5		3600	3.6			2005
OGLE-2005-BLG-169L	Sagittarius	18^{h} 06^{m} 05^{s}	–30° 43′ 57″	19.4	8800	M?	OGLE-2005-BLG-169Lb	0.041	0.345					2006
OGLE-2005-BLG-390L	Sagittarius	17^{h} 54^{m} 19^{s}	−30° 22′ 38″		21500	M?	OGLE-2005-BLG-390Lb	0.018						2006
OGLE-TR-211	Carina	10^{h} 40^{m} 15^{s}	−62° 27′ 20″		5300	F	OGLE-TR-211 b	1.03	1.36	3.67724	0.051	0	≥87.2	2007
OGLE-TR-182	Carina	11^{h} 09^{m} 19^{s}	−61° 05′ 43″	16.84	12700	G	OGLE-TR-182 b	1.01	1.13	3.9791	0.051	0	85.7	2007
OGLE2-TR-L9	Carina	11^{h} 07^{m} 55^{s}	−61° 08′ 46″		2935	F3	OGLE2-TR-L9 b	4.5	1.61	2.4855335	0.0308			2008
OGLE-2006-BLG-109L	Sagittarius	17^{h} 52^{m} 35^{s}	−30° 05′ 16″		4900	M0V?	OGLE-2006-BLG-109Lb	0.71		1825	2.3			2008
OGLE-2006-BLG-109L	Sagittarius	17^{h} 52^{m} 35^{s}	−30° 05′ 16″		4900	M0V?	OGLE-2006-BLG-109Lc	0.27		5100	4.8	0.11	59	2008
OGLE-2012-BLG-0026L		17^{h} 34^{m} 19^{s}	−27° 08′ 34″		4080		OGLE-2012-BLG-0026Lb	0.11			3.82			2012
OGLE-2012-BLG-0026L		17^{h} 34^{m} 19^{s}	−27° 08′ 34″		4080		OGLE-2012-BLG-0026Lc	0.68			4.63			2012
OGLE-2011-BLG-0251		17^{h} 38^{m} 14^{s}	−27° 08′ 10″		8232	M	OGLE-2011-BLG-0251 b	0.53			2.72 or 1.5			2013
OGLE-2007-BLG-349(AB)					8000		OGLE-2007-BLG-349(AB)b	0.25			2.9			2016
OGLE-2016-BLG-1190L	Sagittarius	17^{h} 58^{m} 53^{s}	−27° 36′ 49″		22000	G	OGLE-2016-BLG-1190Lb	13.38		1223.6	2.17	0.42	41.2	2017
OGLE-2016-BLG-1195L							OGLE-2016-BLG-1195Lb	0.0045						2017
OGLE-2013-BLG-0132L					13000		OGLE-2013-BLG-0132Lb	0.29						2017
OGLE-2013-BLG-1721L					21000		OGLE-2013-BLG-1721Lb	0.64			2.6			2017
OGLE-2016-BLG-0263L					21000		OGLE-2016-BLG-0263Lb	4.10			5.4			2017
OGLE-2018-BLG-0799L					2900		OGLE-2018-BLG-0799Lb	0.22			1.75			2018
N/A							OGLE-2019-BLG-0551b	0.0242						2020
OGLE-2019-BLG-0960L							OGLE-2019-BLG-0960Lb	0.0071						2021

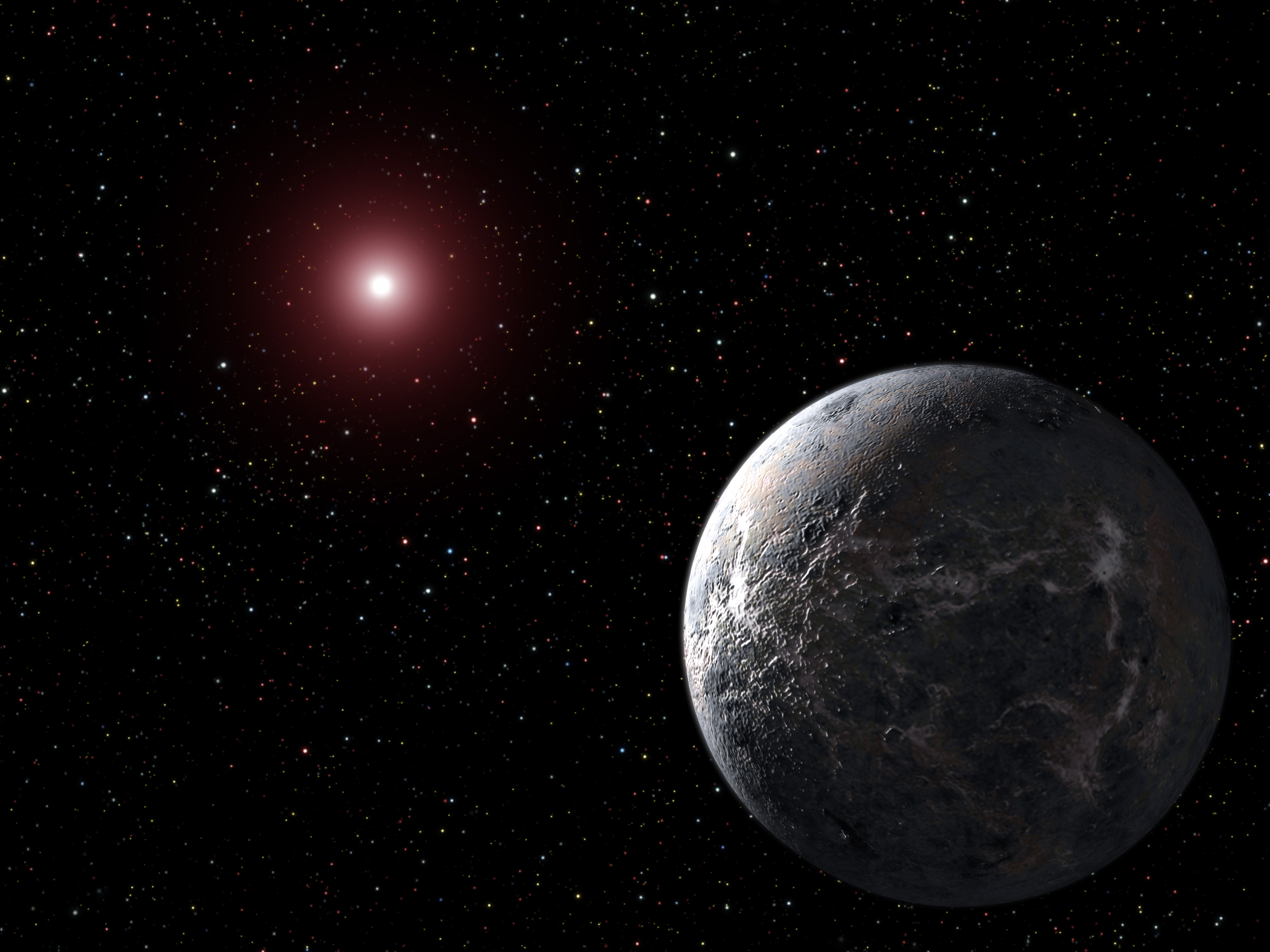
Artist's impression of the planet OGLE-2005-BLG-390Lb discovered by the OGLE Team

Notes: For events detected by the gravitational microlensing method, year stands for OGLE season, BLG means that an event detected is in the Galactic BuLGe, and the following 3-digit number is an ordinal number of microlensing event in that season. For events detected by the transit method TR stands for TRansit and the following 3-digit number is an ordinal number of transit event.

== See also ==
- Variable stars
- Cepheids
- All Sky Automated Survey
- Bohdan Paczyński
- Andrzej Udalski
- Grzegorz Pojmański
- List of planetary systems
- Microlensing Observations in Astrophysics (MOA)

== Gallery ==
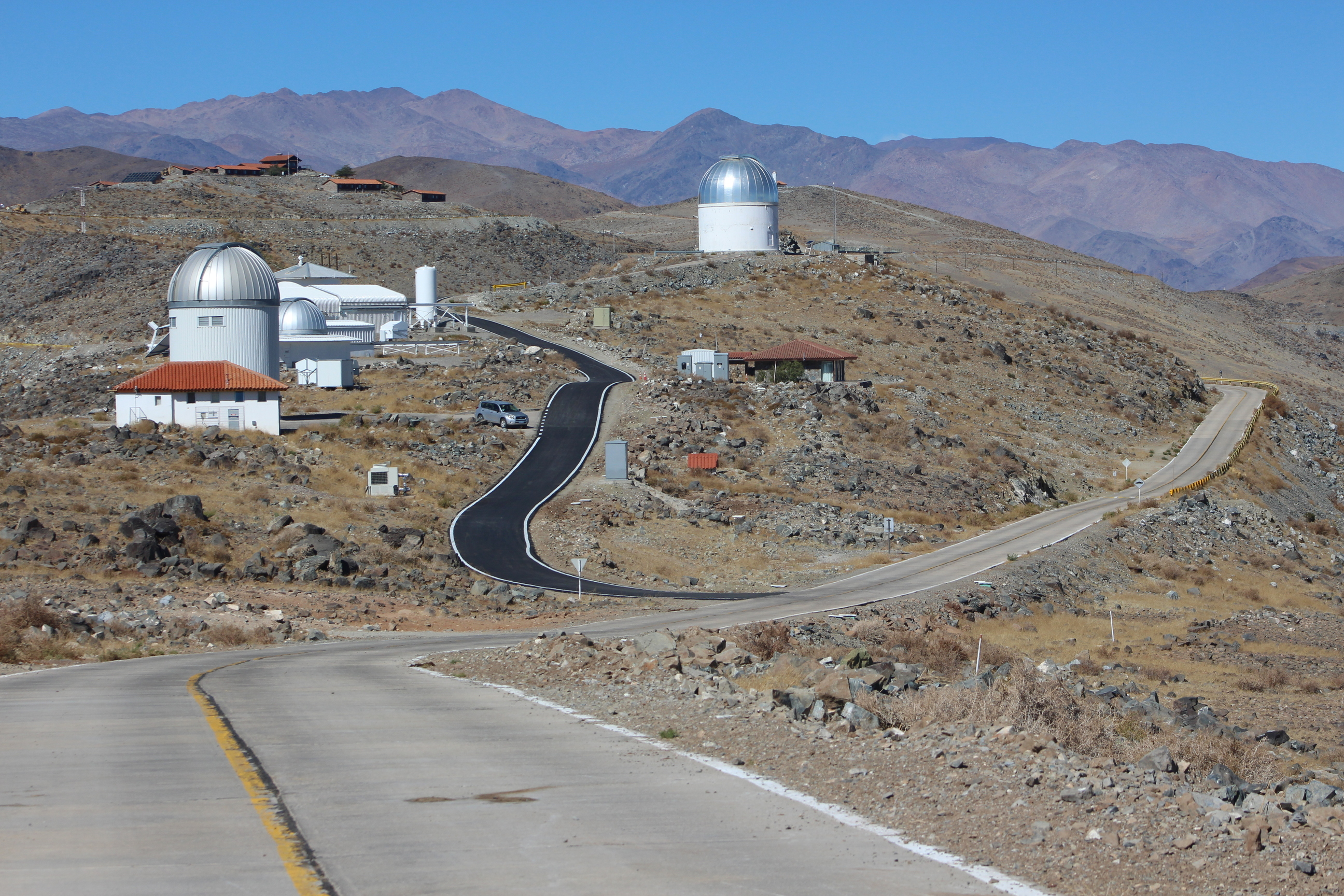
View on the OGLE telescope (in the foreground on the left) and Swope Telescope (in the background above the center)

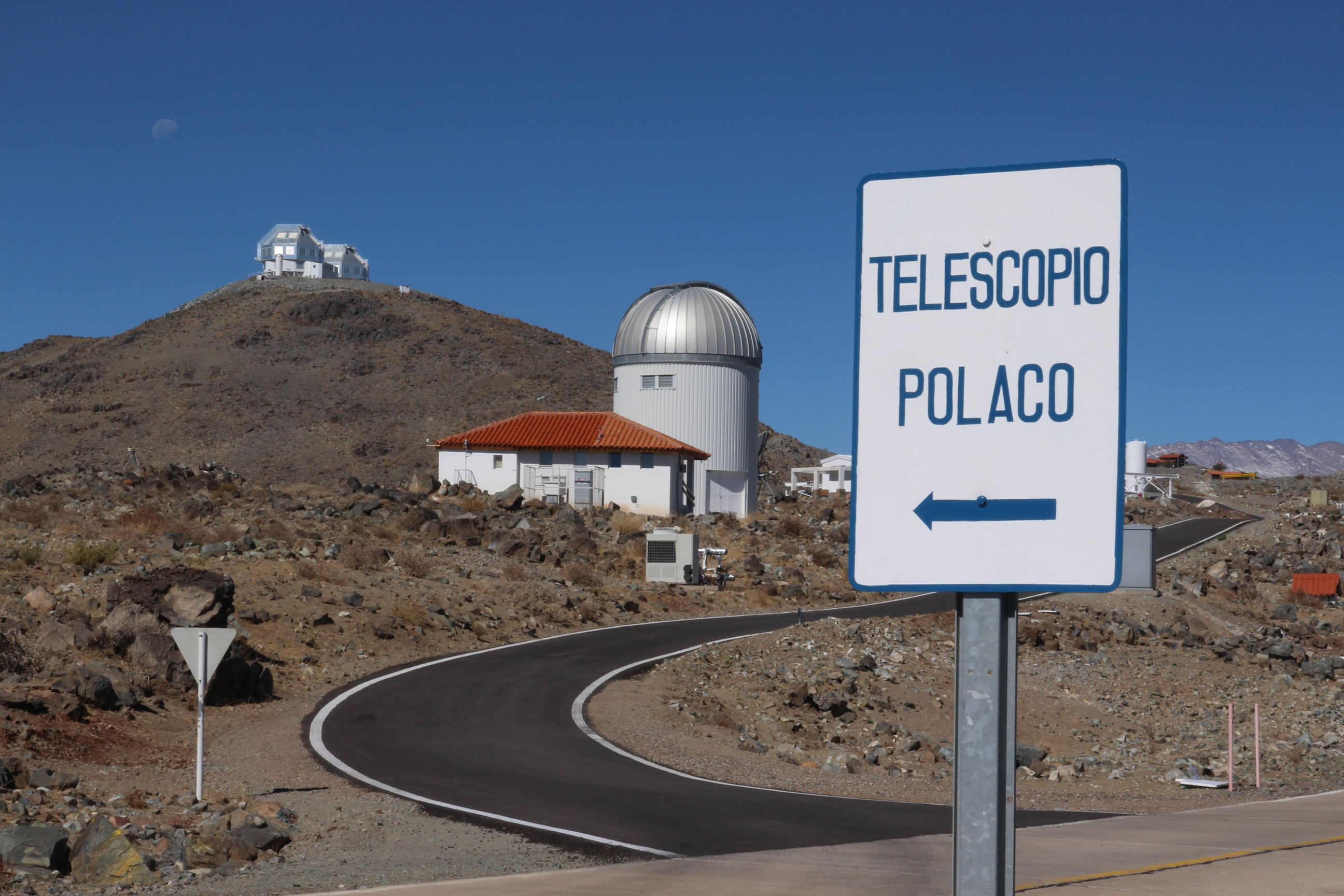
Sign to the OGLE telescope. Twin 6.5-meter Magellan Telescopes are seen in the background

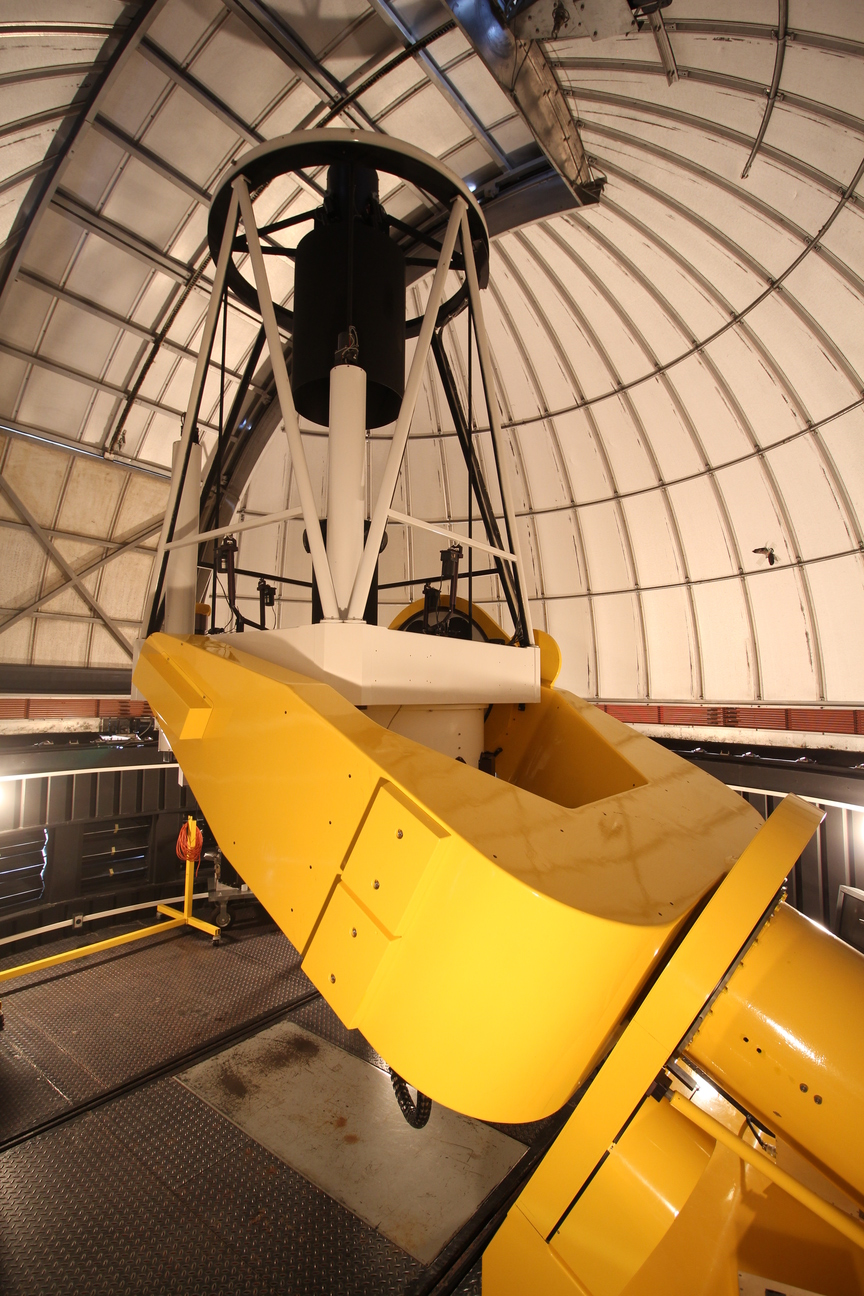
OGLE telescope inside the dome

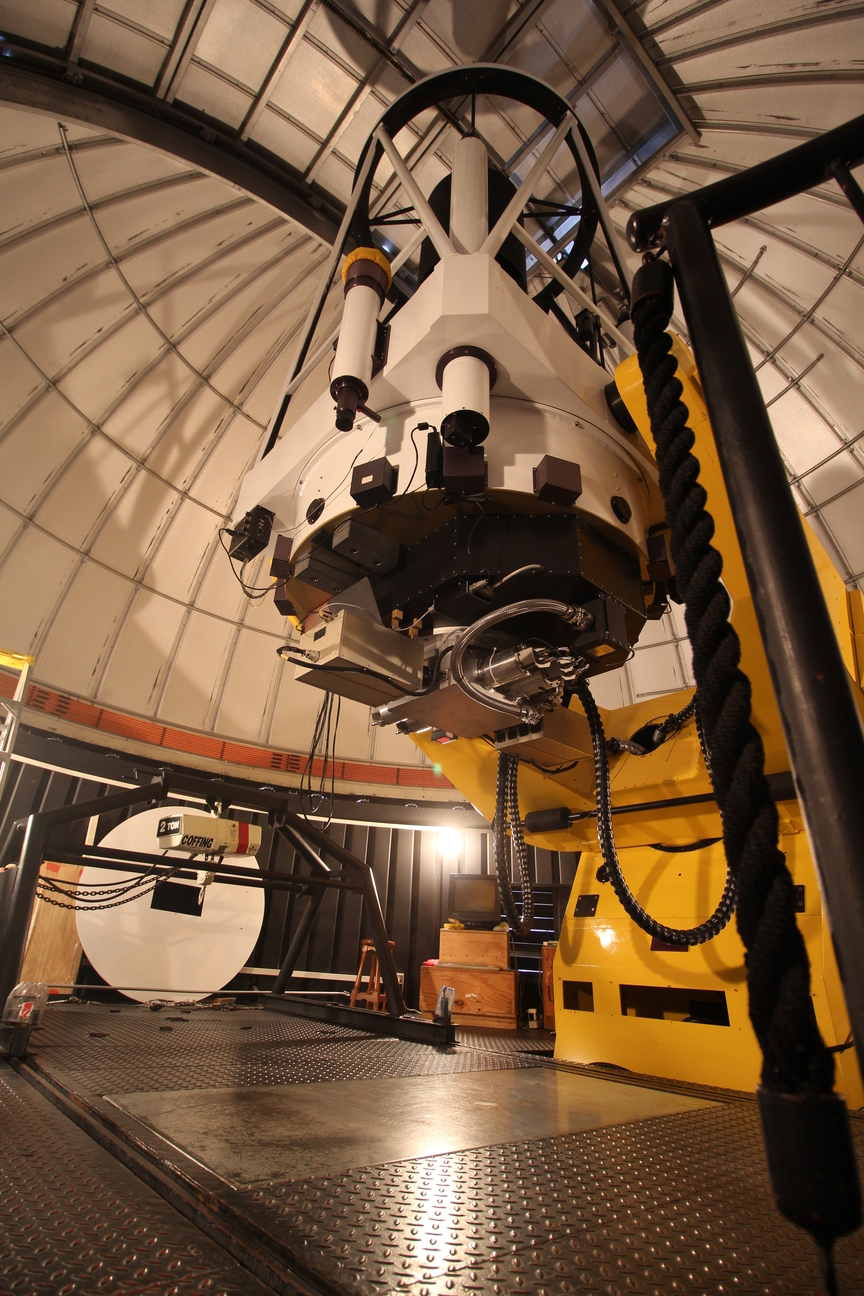
Telescope with the attached OGLE-IV camera
