= OGLE-TR-10b =

Hot Jupiter orbiting OGLE-TR-10

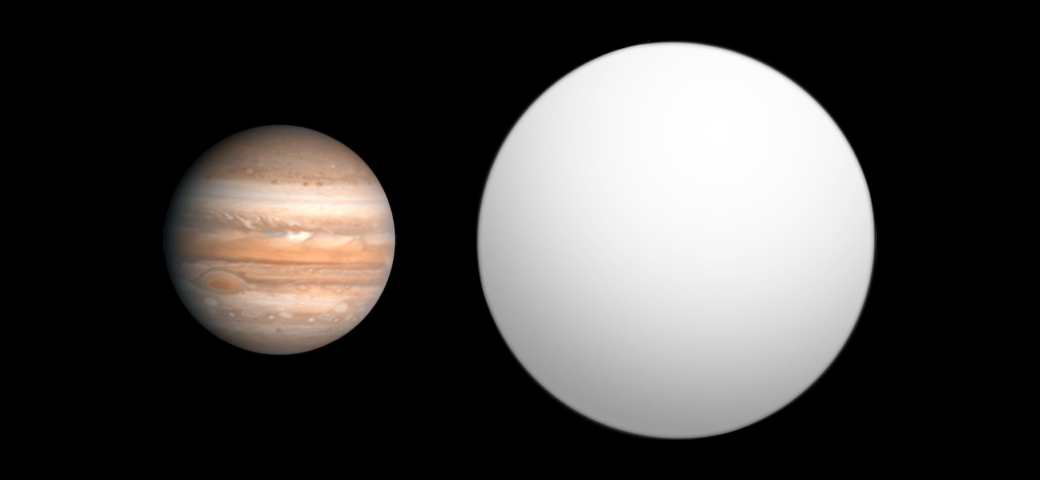
- Size comparison of OGLE-TR-10b with Jupiter.

Discovery
- Discovered by: Konacki et al.
- Discovery site: Las Campanas Observatory in Chile
- Discovery date: Dec 20, 2002
- Detection method: Transit

Orbital characteristics
- Semi-major axis: 0.04162 ± 0.00004 AU (6,226,300 ± 6,000 km)
- Orbital period (sidereal): 3.10129 ± 0.00001 d
- Inclination: 84.5 ± 0.6
- Semi-amplitude: 100 ± 43
- Star: OGLE-TR-10

Physical characteristics
- Mean radius: 1.72 ± 0.11 R_{J}
- Mass: 0.68 ± 0.15 M_{J}
- Mean density: 0.42 g/cm^{3}
- Surface gravity: 0.94 g

OGLE-TR-10b is an extrasolar planet orbiting the star OGLE-TR-10.

The planet was first detected by the Optical Gravitational Lensing Experiment (OGLE) survey in 2002. The star, OGLE-TR-10, was seen dimming by a tiny amount every three days. The transit lightcurve resembles that of HD 209458 b, the first transiting extrasolar planet. However, the mass of the object had to be measured by the radial velocity method because other objects like red dwarfs and brown dwarfs can mimic the planetary transit. In late 2004 it was confirmed as the fifth planetary discovery by OGLE.

The planet is a typical "hot Jupiter", a planet with a mass half that of Jupiter and orbital distance only 1/24 that of Earth from the Sun. One revolution around the star takes a little over three days to complete. The planet is slightly larger than Jupiter, probably due to the heat from the star.

OGLE-TR-10 was identified as a promising candidate by the OGLE team during their 2001 campaign in three fields towards the Galactic Center. The possible planetary nature of its companion was based on spectroscopic follow-up. A reported a tentative radial velocity semi-amplitude (from Keck-I/HIRES) of 100±43 m/s, and a mass for the putative planet of 0.7 ± 0.3 MJup was confirmed in 2004 with the UVES/FLAMES radial velocities. However, the possibility of a blend could not be ruled out.

A blend scenario as an alternative explanation from an analysis combining all available radial velocity measurements with the OGLE light curve. OGLE-TR-10b has a mass of 0.68 ± 0.15 MJup and a radius of 1.72 ± 0.11 RJup. These parameters bear close resemblance to those of the first known transiting extrasolar planet, HD 209458 b.

The planets with the longer periods in the hot Jupiter class all have small masses (~0.7 MJup), while all the short-period planets (i.e., very hot Jupiters) have masses roughly twice as large. This trend may be related to the survival of planets in proximity to their parent stars.
