= OGLE-2005-BLG-390Lb =

Super-Earth ice exoplanet

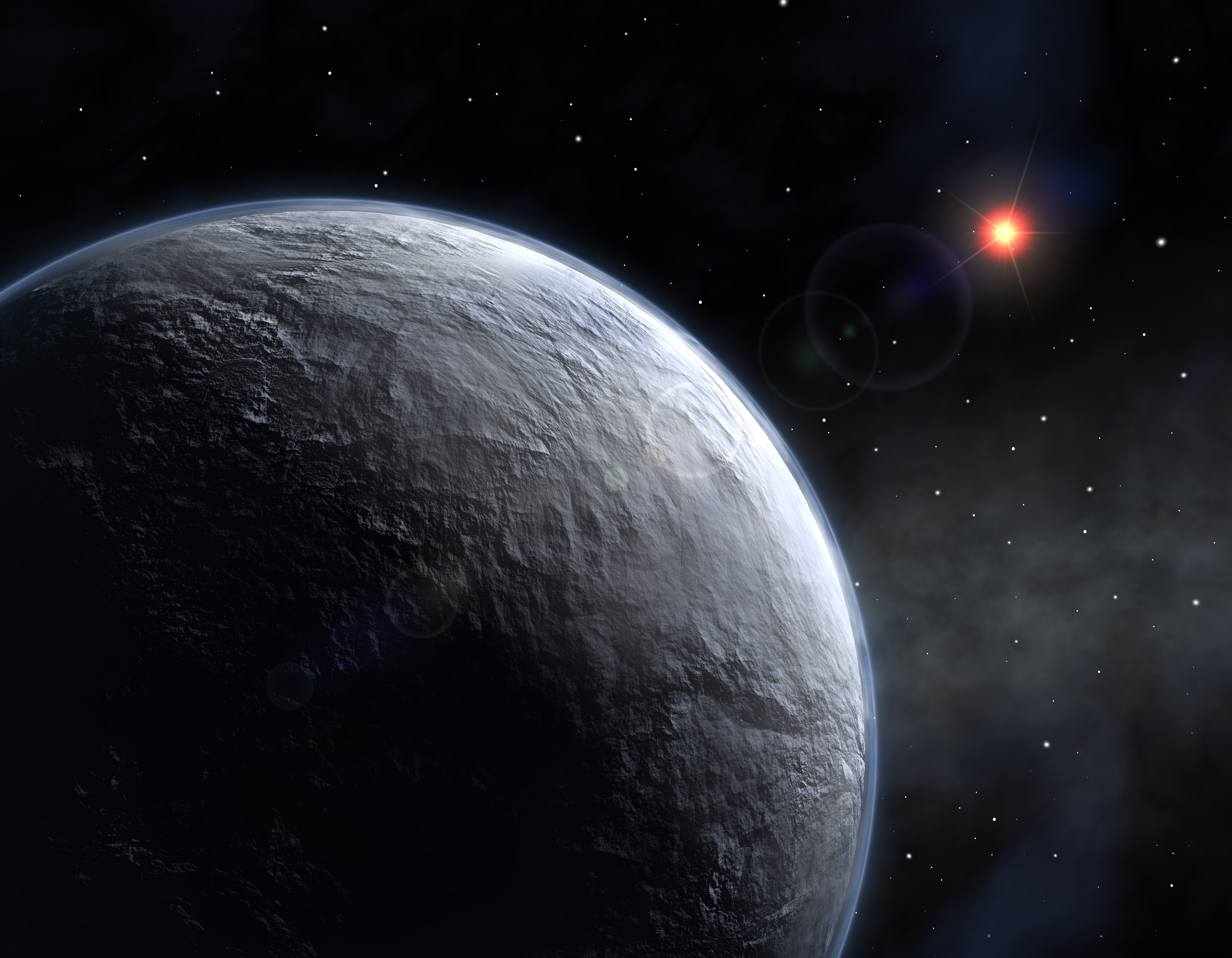
- Artist's impression of OGLE-2005-BLG-390Lb, one of the most distant exoplanets discovered.

Discovery
- Discovered by: PLANET/RoboNet, OGLE, MOA
- Discovery site: La Silla Observatory
- Discovery date: 25 January 2006
- Detection method: Gravitational microlensing

Orbital characteristics
- Semi-major axis: 2.0–4.1 AU
- Orbital period (sidereal): 3500 d ~10 y
- Star: OGLE-2005-BLG-390L

Physical characteristics
- Mass: 5.5^{+5.5}_{−2.7} M_{🜨}
- Temperature: 50 K (−220 °C; −370 °F)

OGLE-2005-BLG-390Lb (known sometimes as Hoth by NASA) is a super-Earth ice exoplanet orbiting OGLE-2005-BLG-390L, a star 21,500 ± 3,300 light-years (6,600 ± 1,000 parsecs) from Earth near the center of the Milky Way, making it one of the most distant planets known. On January 25, 2006, Probing Lensing Anomalies NETwork/Robotic Telescope Network (PLANET/Robonet), Optical Gravitational Lensing Experiment (OGLE), and Microlensing Observations in Astrophysics (MOA) made a joint announcement of the discovery. The planet does not appear to meet conditions presumed necessary to support life.

== Characteristics ==
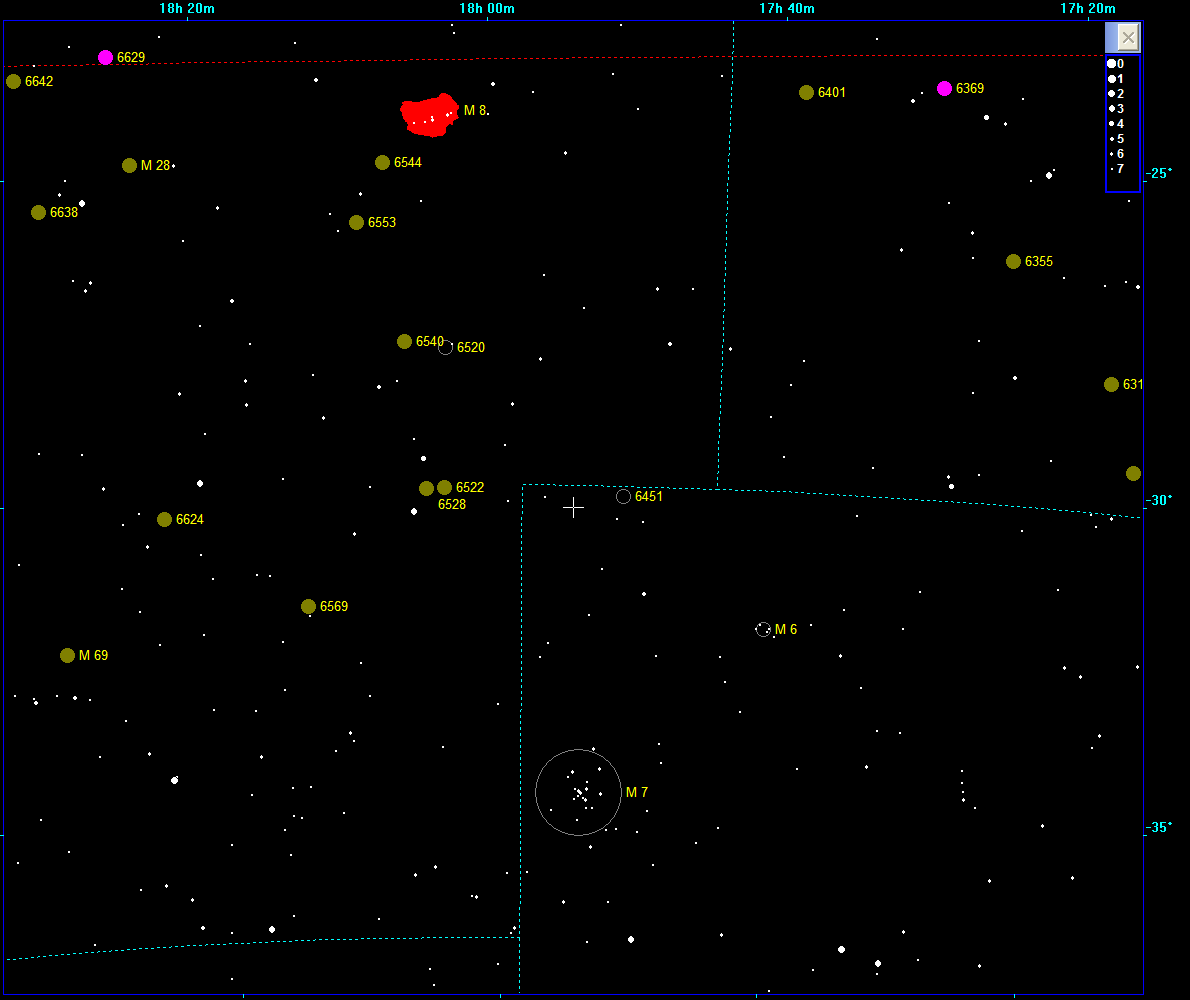
OGLE-2005-BLG-390L's location in the night sky

=== Mass, radius and temperature ===
The planet is estimated to be about five times Earth's mass (5.5^{+5.5}_{−2.7} M_{🜨}). Some astronomers have speculated that it may have a rocky core like Earth, with a thin atmosphere. Its distance from the star, and the star's relatively low temperature, means that the planet's likely surface temperature is around 50 K (−220 °C; −370 °F), making it one of the coldest known. If it is a rocky world, this temperature would make it likely that the surface would be made of frozen volatiles, substances which would be liquids or gases on Earth: water, ammonia, methane and nitrogen would all be frozen solid. If it is not a rocky planet, it would more closely resemble an icy gas planet like Uranus, although much smaller.

The planet is notable for its large distance from its star for such a relatively small exoplanet - these planets are challenging to find with other detection methods. Prior to this, "small" exoplanets such as Gliese 876 d, which has an orbital period of less than 2 Earth-days, were detected very close to their stars. OGLE-2005-BLG-390Lb shows a combination of size and orbit that would not make it out of place in the Solar System.

At the time of its discovery, 160 exoplanets had been discovered and this planet replaced the 7.5 Earth mass Gliese 876 d as the lowest-mass exoplanet found orbiting a main sequence star.

=== Host star ===
OGLE-2005-BLG-390L (located in the constellation Scorpius, RA 17:54:19.2, Dec −30°22′38″, J2000, 6.6 ± 1.0 kpc distance) is thought to likely be a cool red dwarf (95% probability), or a white dwarf (4% probability), with a very slight chance that it is a neutron star or black hole (<1% probability). Regardless of the star's classification, its radiant energy output would be significantly less than that of the Sun. It has a mass of 0.22 M_{☉}, but an unknown radius. If it is a red dwarf, it would likely have a radius of 0.17 R_{☉}. The age is estimated to be around 9.587 billion years old.

=== Orbit ===
OGLE-2005-BLG-390Lb orbits its star every 3,500 days (about 10 years) at an average distance of 2.0 to 4.1 AU (300 to 610 million km; 190 to 380 million mi), or an orbit that would fall between the orbits of Mars and Jupiter in the Solar System (This range of distances is the range of error in measurement and calculation; it does not represent the planet's orbital eccentricity, as its orbital elements are not known, other than its orbital period). Until this discovery, no small exoplanet had been found farther than 0.15 AU (22 million km; 14 million mi) from a main-sequence star.

== Discovery ==
An illustration of gravitational microlensing. Light from a distant star is bent due to the gravitational field of an intervening foreground star and its orbiting planet, resulting in at least three (unresolved) distorted images. The change of their solid angle subtained on the sky corresponds to an observable brightening of the observed source star.

OGLE-2005-BLG-390Lb's signature was first detected on January 25, 2006, by observations at the Danish 1.54-m telescope at ESO La Silla Observatory in Chile. The telescope was part of a network of telescopes used by the PLANET/RoboNet gravitational microlensing campaign. Much of the follow-up observational data was gathered by a 0.6-m telescope at the Perth Observatory in Western Australia.

Gravitational lensing occurs when light from a distant star is bent and magnified by the gravitational field of a foreground star. A gravitational microlensing event occurs when a planet accompanying this foreground star can cause an additional small increase in the intensity of magnified light as it passes between the background star and the observer as well.

The PLANET/RoboNet campaign regularly investigates promising microlensing event alerts that are issued by the Polish OGLE or the Japanese–New Zealand MOA survey. The observation of just such an event led to the discovery of OGLE-2005-BLG-390Lb. OGLE detected the microlensing effect produced by the star OGLE-2005-BLG-390L, and it was the PLANET team's follow-up observations and analysis which uncovered evidence of the planet itself.

The PLANET team conducted close observation of the OGLE-2005-BLG-390 microlensing event over a period of about two weeks. During this series of observations, a 15% "spike" in intensity occurred, lasting approximately 12 hours. From the intensity of the increase, and its length, the PLANET astronomers were able to derive the planet's mass, and its approximate displacement from the star.

The paper submitted to Nature bears the names of all members of PLANET, RoboNet, OGLE, and MOA.

== In popular culture ==
The planet has been given the unofficial name of Hoth by NASA due to its resemblance to the planet with the same name from the Star Wars franchise. A similar exoplanet, OGLE-2016-BLG-1195Lb, has also been compared to Hoth.

== See also ==
- Gliese 581 c
- Gliese 581 g
- OGLE-2005-BLG-169Lb
- Planetary habitability
- List of coolest exoplanets
