= Pojmański =

Pojmański may refer to:

- Grzegorz Pojmański (born 1959, Polish astronomer
- C/2006 A1 (Pojmański), comet discovered by Grzegorz Pojmański
