= Paczyński =

Paczyński is a Polish surname. Notable people with the surname include:

- Bohdan Paczyński (1940–2007), Polish astronomer
  - Paczyński–Wiita potential
- Józef Paczyński (1920–2015), Polish barber
