= Robert Nemiroff =

Robert Nemiroff may refer to:

- Robert B. Nemiroff, American theater producer and songwriter
- Robert J. Nemiroff, American astrophysicist
- Robert V. Barron (1932–2000), American actor born Robert V. Nemiroff
