= Piotr Kosek =

Polish YouTuber (born 1986)

- Born: 1986 (age 39–40)
- Occupations: Entertainer, educator, YouTuber

YouTube information
- Channel: Astrofaza
- Years active: 2015–present
- Subscribers: 595,000
- Views: 204 million
- Last updated: 1 October 2025

Piotr Kosek (Polish: [ˈpjɔtr ˈkɔ.sɛk]; born 1986) is a Polish educator and entertainer, publishing popular science educational videos about astronomy and space exploration, on his YouTube channel, titled Astrofaza (Polish: [as.trɔˈfa.za]; from Latin astrum 'star', and Polish faza 'craving'). He also streams video games. As of October 2025, it has 595,000 subscribers, being the most popular Polish-language space-related YouTube channel.

== Biography ==
Piotr Kosek was born in 1986, and grew up in Płock, Poland. He has a degree in English studies.

He began his YouTube career by posting a series Się Kręci, recorded together with his friend Kamil Wojkowski, which was best known for surveying people's opinions on the streets of Płock. Later, he also made animated shorts. In January 2015, he started the channel Astrofaza (from Latin astrum 'star', and Polish faza 'craving'), in which he began posting popular science educational videos about astronomy and space exploration, as well, as streaming video games, such as Kerbal Space Program. At the time, he worked as a marketer and photographer in Gdańsk, later ending his employment and moving back to Płock, to focus on developing the channel. As of October 2025, it had 595,000 subscribers, being the most popular Polish-language space-related YouTube channel. Kosek cooperates with the Nicolaus Copernicus University in Toruń, and its Institute of Astronomy. In 2017, he was also a guest in an episode of the TVP educational television series Astronarium.

In 2017, he published 37-minute-long educational film about the black holes, titled Black Holes: Masters of Time and Space, which was awarded with a Grand Video Award in the popular science category. He was also nominated to the Tech Awards in 2017, Popularyzator Nauki in 2018, and the Grand Video Awards in 2022.

In 2022, he joined the multi-channel network Video Brothers. Previously, his channel was associated with LifeTube.

A book written by him, titled Astrofaza – jak skończy się ludzkość? (Astrofaza: How Will the Humanity End?), was released in 2023 by Altenberg publishing house. It combines elements of novel and popular science education formats, presenting theories about the potential scenarios of the human extinction.

== Books ==
- Astrofaza – jak skończy się ludzkość? (2023; Altenberg; ISBN 9788366747784)

== Awards and nominations ==
Ceremony	Year	Category	Nominated work	Result	Ref.
Grand Video Awards	2017	Popular Science	Black Holes: Masters of Time and Space	Won	
Grand Video Awards	2022	Branded Content	Helgoland – Tajemnica elektronów wyjaśniona	Nominated	
Tech Awards	2017	Best YouTube Channel	Astrofaza	Nominated	
Popularyzator Nauki	2018	Media	—N/a	Nominated	
