= V598 Puppis =

Star in the constellation Puppis

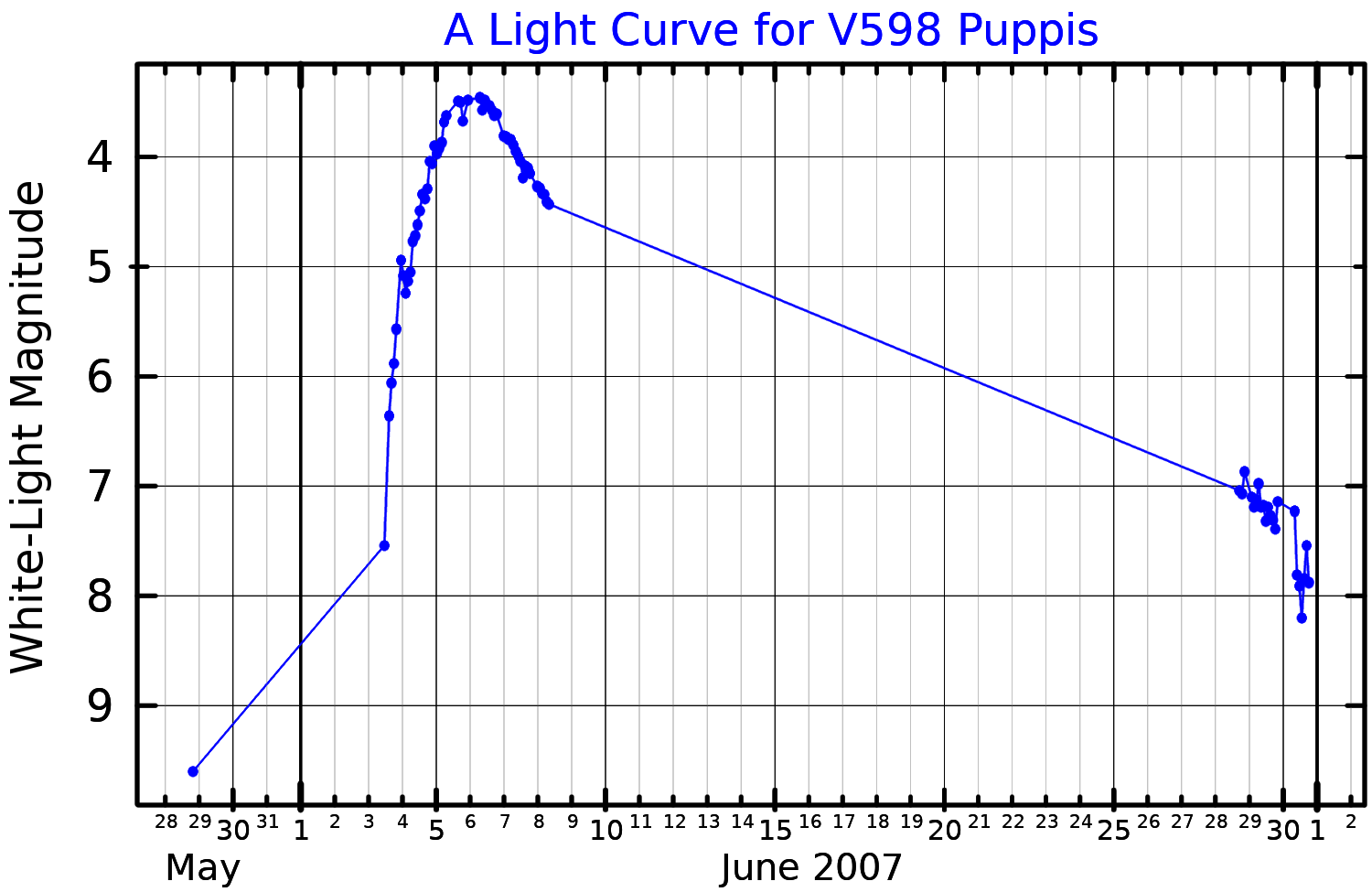
- A light curve for V598 Puppis, plotted from data published by Hounsell et al. (2016)

Observation data Epoch J2000.0 Equinox ICRS
- Constellation: Puppis
- Right ascension: 07^{h} 05^{m} 42.500^{s}
- Declination: −38° 14′ 39.44″
- Apparent magnitude (V): ~3.6 - 16.6

Characteristics
- Variable type: Nova

Astrometry
Radial velocity (R_{v})	+292 km/s
Proper motion (μ)	RA: +0.927 mas/yr Dec.: +7.149 mas/yr
Parallax (π)	0.5403±0.0306 mas
Distance	6,000 ± 300 ly (1,900 ± 100 pc)

Other designations
- Nova Puppis 2007b, V598 Pup, 2MASS J07054250-3814394, USNO-A2.0 0450-03360039

Database references
SIMBAD	data

V598 Puppis is the name given to a nova in the Milky Way Galaxy. USNO-A2.0 0450-03360039, a catalog number for the star, was discovered to be much brighter than normal in X-ray emissions on October 9, 2007, by the European Space Agency's XMM-Newton telescope. The star was confirmed to be over 10 magnitudes, or 10,000 times, brighter than normal by the Magellan-Clay telescope Magellan-Clay telescope at Las Campanas Observatory in Chile. Pre-discovery images and identification of the progenitor would ultimately shows that the nova brightened from visual magnitude 16.6 to brighter than magnitude 4.

The nova has been officially given the variable star designation V598 Puppis and is one of the brightest in the last decade. Despite its brightness, the nova was apparently missed by amateur and professional astronomers alike until XMM-Newton spotted the unusual X-ray source while turning from one target to another. The All Sky Automated Survey determined that the nova had occurred between June 2 and 5, 2007, peaking in brightness on June 5.

The orbital period of the two stars in V598 Puppis is 0.1628714 days, or 3 hours, 54 minutes, and 32 seconds.
