= Capo Murro di Porco Lighthouse =

Lighthouse in Sicily, Italy

Capo Murro di Porco
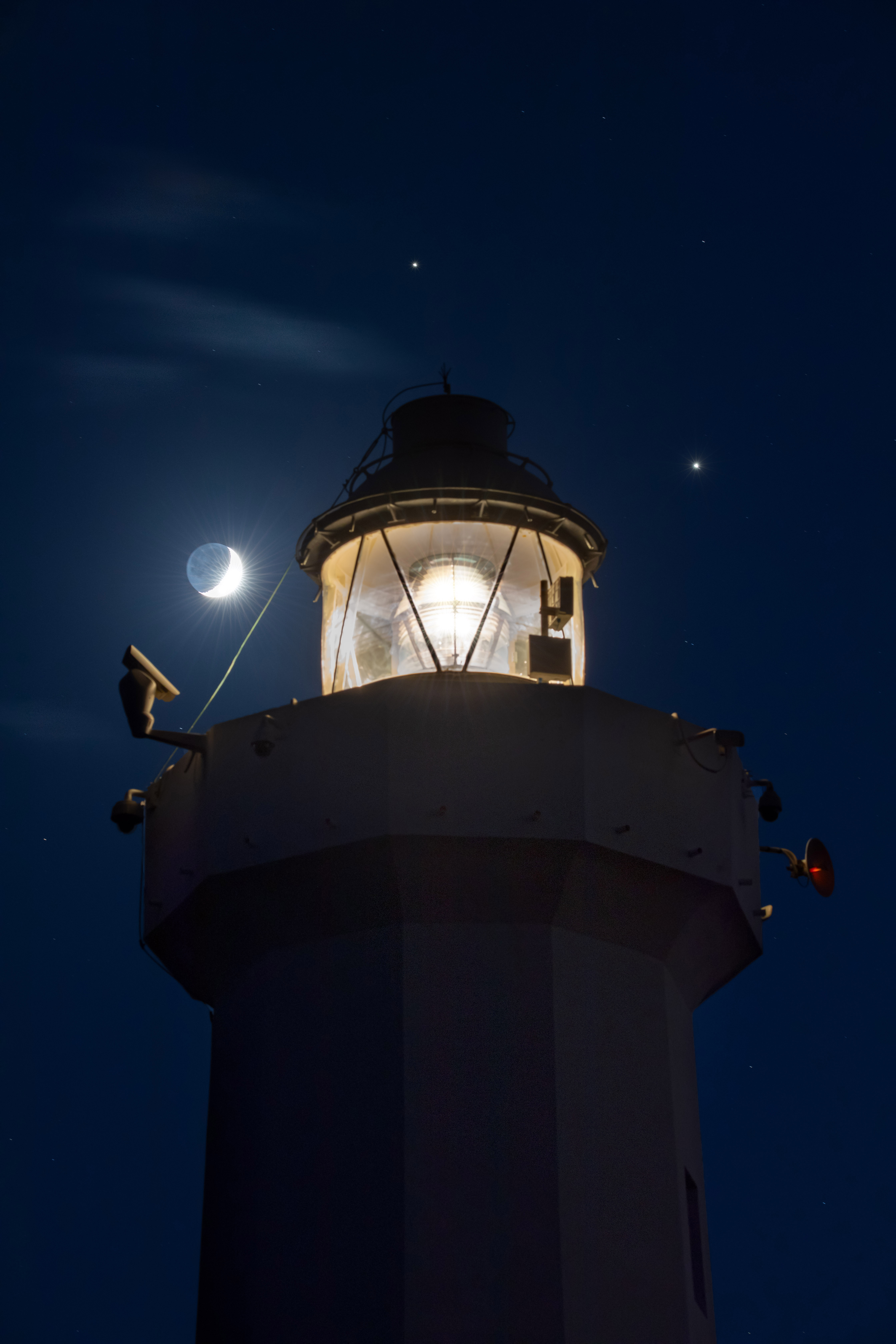
- Astronomy Picture of the Day depicts the Lighthouse of Cape Murro di Porco
- Location: Maddalena Peninsula; Siracusa; Sicily; Italy
- Coordinates: 37°00′11″N 15°20′06″E

Tower
- Constructed: 1859
- Foundation: concrete base
- Construction: concrete tower
- Height: 20 metres (66 ft)
- Shape: decagonal tower with balcony and lantern attached to 1-storey keeper's house
- Markings: white tower and lantern, grey metallic lantern dome
- Power source: mains electricity
- Operator: Marina Militare

Light
- First lit: 1959
- Focal height: 34 metres (112 ft)
- Lens: Type OF 800; Focal length: 400mm
- Intensity: main: AL 1000 W reserve: LABI 100 W
- Range: mains: 17 nautical miles (31 km; 20 mi) reserve: 10 nautical miles (19 km; 12 mi)
- Characteristic: Fl W 5s.
- Italy no.: 2910 E.F.

Capo Murro di Porco Lighthouse (Italian: Faro di Capo Murro di Porco) is an active lighthouse located at the end of the Maddalena Peninsula on the south eastern tip of Sicily in the Area marina protetta Plemmirio, municipality of Siracusa on the Ionian Sea.

== Description ==
The lighthouse, built in 1859 under the Kingdom of the Two Sicilies, consists of a concrete tapered decagonal tower, 20 metres (66 ft) high, with balcony and lantern attached to 1-storey keeper's house. No longer inhabited but it was recently awarded by the state property agency for development in lighthouse accommodated to the privates, the "Beacon Hope - Lighthouse Resort", founded by the local entrepreneur Sebastian Cortese. The tower and the lantern are white; the lantern dome is grey metallic. The lantern is positioned at 34 metres (112 ft) above sea level and emits one white flash in a 5 seconds period visible up to a distance of 17 nautical miles (31 km; 20 mi). The lighthouse is completely automated and managed by the Marina Militare with the identification code number 2910 E.F.

In December 2020, a photo taken by photographer Kevin Saragozza of the Jupiter-Saturn conjunction in the background of the lighthouse, was chosen as the "Photo of the Day" by NASA for the Astronomy Picture of the Day.

== See also ==
- List of lighthouses in Italy
