= ASCL =

ASCL or similar may refer to:

== Academia ==
- African Studies Centre Leiden, Netherlands
- American Society of Comparative Law, United States
- Association of School and College Leaders, United Kingdom
- Astrophysics Source Code Library, a software library for research

== Other uses ==
- Arsenic trichloride (AsCl_{3}), a toxic oil
- Atlantic Shopping Centres Limited, a Canadian investment trust (now Crombie REIT)
