= Urania – Postępy Astronomii =

Polish astronomical magazine

Urania - Postępy Astronomii
- Categories: Astronomy
- Frequency: Bi-monthly
- Publisher: Polish Astronomical Society, Polish Society of Astronomy Amateurs
- Total circulation: 3500 (2014)
- First issue: 1922
- Country: Poland
- Based in: Toruń
- Language: Polish
- Website: www.urania.edu.pl
- ISSN: 1689-6009

Urania – Postępy Astronomii is a Polish astronomical magazine. The history of the magazine started with Uranja published by the Polish Society of Astronomy Amateurs in 1922. In 1936 the magazine changed its name to Urania due to reforms in Polish spelling. In 1998, Urania merged with Postępy Astronomii - a magazine of the Polish Astronomical Society, becoming Urania - Postępy Astronomii, a bi-monthly popular magazine about astronomy and space, continuing the volume numbering of Urania.
