= Alice Allen (astronomer) =

American information technology specialist and astronomer

Alice Allen is an American information technology specialist and astronomer, the editor of the Astrophysics Source Code Library and a faculty specialist in the Astronomy Department of the University of Maryland, College Park.

== Education and career ==
Allen is a graduate of Hunter College, in the School of Health Sciences, where she studied medical laboratory science. She worked in information technology as a consultant, in private industry, and for 22 years in the Division of Information Technology of the Federal Reserve Board, before retiring in 2017.

She became editor of the Astrophysics Source Code Library in 2010, on a volunteer basis, after previously volunteering for the Astronomy Picture of the Day web site. Her work on making available the codes for processing astronomical data has been cited as an important component in the reproducibility of scientific research.

== Recognition ==
In 2023 the American Astronomical Society (AAS) named Allen as a Fellow of the AAS, "for her great insight, deep knowledge, leading advocacy, and inspiring achievements involving open-source astronomy software; for making astronomy more efficient by creating avenues to release and cite research software; and for building, editing, and promoting the Astrophysics Source Code Library".
