= C/2006 A1 (Pojmański) =

Non-periodic comet

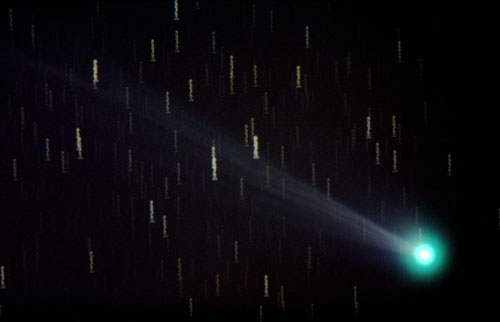
- Comet Pojmański photographed by John Drummond on 24 February 2006.

Discovery
- Discovered by: Grzegorz Pojmański
- Discovery site: Las Campanas Observatory
- Discovery date: 2 January 2006

Orbital characteristics
- Epoch: 24 March 2006 (JD 2453818.5)
- Observation arc: 247 days
- Earliest precovery date: 25 December 2005
- Number of observations: 600
- Aphelion: ~2,530 AU
- Perihelion: 0.555 AU
- Semi-major axis: ~2,380 AU
- Eccentricity: 0.99977
- Orbital period: ~45,000 years
- Inclination: 92.736°
- Longitude of ascending node: 211.34°
- Argument of periapsis: 351.19°
- Mean anomaly: 0.0003°
- Last perihelion: 22 February 2006
- T_{Jupiter}: –0.042
- Earth MOID: 0.445 AU
- Jupiter MOID: 2.474 AU

Physical characteristics
- Mean radius: 0.867 km (0.539 mi) (Note: Calculated mean radius using the formula: $\log_{10}\,(\,R\,)\ =\;0.9 +\;0.13 (\,H\,)$ Where $\,H\,$ is the comet's absolute total magnitude (M1))
- Comet total magnitude (M1): 7.4
- Comet nuclear magnitude (M2): 14.5
- Apparent magnitude: 4.5 (2006 apparition)

Comet Pojmański, formally designated as C/2006 A1, is a non-periodic comet that became barely visible to the naked eye in early 2006. It is the only comet discovered by Polish astronomer, Grzegorz Pojmański.

== Observational history ==
Pojmański discovered the comet as a 12th-magnitude object in the night sky using the Las Campanas Observatory in Chile as part of the All Sky Automated Survey (ASAS). Kazimieras Cernis at the Institute of Theoretical Physics and Astronomy at Vilnius, Lithuania, located it the same night and before the announcement of Pojmański's discovery, in ultraviolet images taken a few days earlier by the SWAN instrument aboard the Solar and Heliospheric Observatory (SOHO). A pre-discovery picture was later found from 29 December 2005.

At the time of its discovery, the comet was roughly 181 million km (1.21 AU) from the Sun. But orbital elements indicated that on 22 February 2006, it would reach perihelion at a distance of 83 million km (0.55 AU).

The comet moved on a northward path across the night sky, and reached maximum brightness around the beginning of March. Comet Pojmański reached the very fringe of naked-eye visibility at about magnitude 5, and was best visible through binoculars or a telescope. It could be found in the dawn sky within the constellation Capricornus, close to the horizon in the northern hemisphere, during late February, but viewing circumstances became better for the northern hemisphere as the comet departed southern skies and continued north.

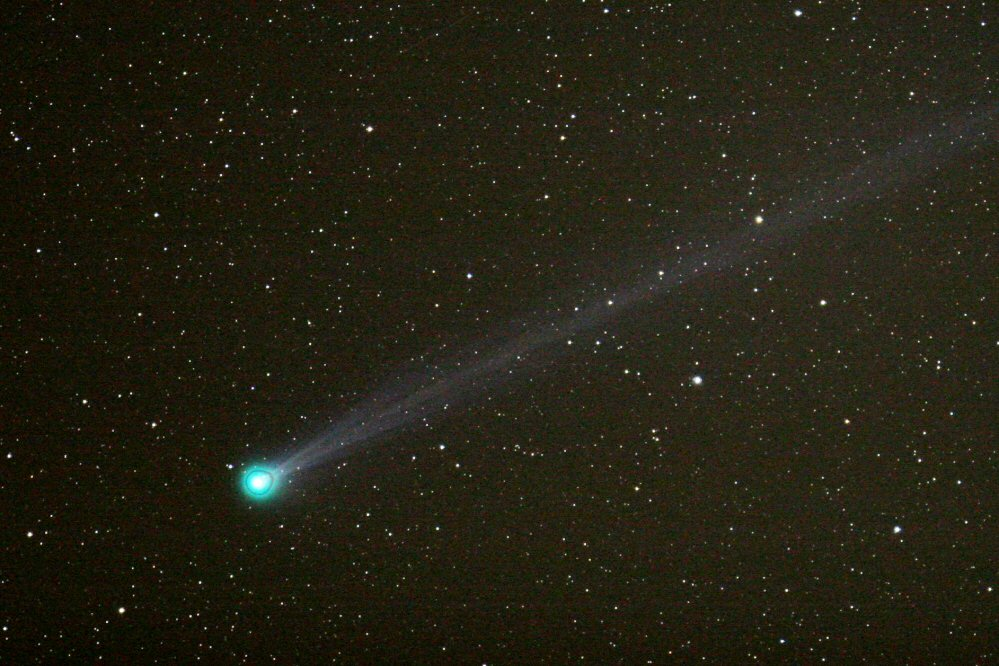
Comet Pojmański (C/2006 A1) from Mt. Laguna, March 2, 2006.

By early March, the comet was located in Aquila, the Eagle, and by March 7 was located in the constellation Delphinus.

Comet Pojmański brightened more than initially estimated, perhaps due to over-cautious estimates by astronomers. It had previously been estimated to reach a maximum brightness of around 6.5 magnitude, but became considerably brighter.

During the comet's appearance, it sported a tail of three to seven degrees (six to fourteen times the apparent lunar diameter) and a coma of up to about 10 arcseconds.

== See also ==
- All Sky Automated Survey
- Bohdan Paczyński
