= Bohdan Paczyński =

Polish astronomer (1940–2007)

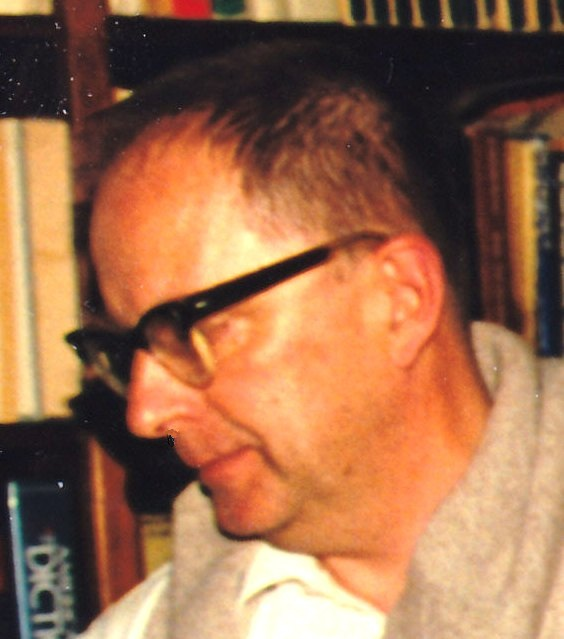
- Paczyński in 1990
- Born: 8 February 1940; Vilnius, Lithuania
- Died: 19 April 2007 (aged 67); Princeton, New Jersey, United States
- Education: University of Warsaw (MA, PhD, Habilitation)
- Known for: Paczyński-Wiita potential Gravitational microlensing Gamma ray bursts Kilonova; Super-Eddington accretion disks Optical Gravitational Lensing Experiment
- Spouse: Hanna Adamska (m. 1964)
- Children: 2
- Awards: Karl Schwarzschild Medal (1981); Eddington Medal (1987); Heineman Prize (1992); Prize of the Foundation for Polish Science (1996); Henry Draper Medal (1997); Gold Medal of the Royal Astronomical Society (1999); Bruno Rossi Prize (2000); Marian Smoluchowski Medal (2000); Bruce Medal (2002); Henry Norris Russell Lectureship (2006)
- Scientific career
- Fields: Astrophysics; Astronomy
- Workplaces: Polish Academy of Sciences; Princeton University
- Thesis: Determination of Fluctuation Parameters of Interstellar Matter From Star Counts (1964)
- Doctoral advisor: Stefan Piotrowski
- Doctoral students: Anna N. Żytkow; Robert J. Nemiroff; Krzysztof Stanek; Marek Sikora

Bohdan Krzysztof Paczyński (also spelled Paczynski; Polish: [ˈbɔxdan paˈt͡ʂɨɲski]; 8 February 1940 – 19 April 2007) was a Polish astronomer and astrophysicist. Educated at the University of Warsaw, he became the Lyman Spitzer Jr. Professor of Astrophysics at Princeton University.

Paczyński is widely recognized for his highly original theories and research in the fields of cosmology, stellar evolution, accretion disks, the nature of gamma ray bursts, and time-domain astronomy, which reshaped modern understanding of high‑energy astrophysical phenomena and opened new observational pathways for studying distant objects in the universe. He was instrumental in founding the Nicolaus Copernicus Astronomical Center (CAMK) in Warsaw and launching the Optical Gravitational Lensing Experiment (OGLE), one of the most efficient photometric sky survey projects in the history of observational astronomy.

Paczyński was the recipient of numerous awards and honours for his contributions to science such as the Eddington Medal (1987), the Henry Draper Medal (1997), the Gold Medal of the Royal Astronomical Society (1999), and the Order of Polonia Restituta (2007). He was a member of many learned societies including the Polish Academy of Sciences, the Royal Astronomical Society, and the National Academy of Sciences.

== Life and career ==
=== Early life and education ===
Paczyński was born on 8 February 1940 in Wilno, then under the Soviet occupation (now Vilnius, Lithuania), to Polish parents. His mother was Helena (née Milkowska), a Polish language teacher, and his father was Jan Paczyński, a lawyer. He was one of two siblings, with younger sister, Ewa. During World War II, his family remained in Lithuania. In 1945–1947, they relocated to Kraków and subsequently to Moscow, before finally settling in Warsaw in 1949. In 1957, Paczyński graduated from the Hugo Kołłątaj High School in Warsaw.

From an early age, Paczyński showed a keen interest in science and astronomy. At 14, he took part in a program tracking brightness changes in binary stars, carrying out his own visual observations. His aptitude for mathematics also emerged early as he placed second in the national mathematics competition for high‑school students. At the age of 18, Paczyński co-wrote his first scientific article Minima of eclipsing variables in 1954-1956 published in Acta Astronomica, detailing the brightness minima of eclipsing binary stars. Thanks to the support of Włodzimierz Zonn, since 1954, he was involved in astronomical observations at the Warsaw University Observatory in Ostrowik. He was given the nickname Bep by his friends working at the observatory, which proved useful for his future American colleagues and students due to its ease of pronunciation.

Paczyński matriculated at the Faculty of Mathematics and Physics of the University of Warsaw in 1959 to study astronomy and graduated in 1962 defending his M.A. thesis, which concerned the dependence of starlight polarization on the extinction of starlight by interstellar dust on the path to the star. Two years later, aged 23, he earned his doctorate based on his dissertation entitled Determination of Fluctuation Parameters of Interstellar Matter From Star Counts written under the supervision of Stefan Piotrowski.

=== Professional career ===
Paczyński's talent was noticed early and the communist authorities granted him permission to leave the Eastern Bloc for the West to carry out research in 1962. He spent a year at Lick Observatory in California. In the same year, Paczyński became a member of the Centre of Astronomy of the Polish Academy of Sciences, where he continued to work for nearly 20 years. In 1974, he received habilitation and in 1979 became a professor. Thanks to his works on theoretical astronomy, at the age of 36, he became the youngest member of the Polish Academy of Sciences (PAN) in history. From 1976 to 1977, he served as head of the Institute of Astronomy of PAN.

In the 1970s, Paczyński was instrumental in establishing the Warsaw-based Nicolaus Copernicus Astronomical Center of the Polish Academy of Sciences. He was elected President of the International Astronomical Union Comission 35 for the 1976–1979 term. At the organization's General Assembly held in 1979 in Montreal, he delivered an Invited Discourse alongside Subrahmanyan Chandrasekhar and Gerhard Herzberg.

=== Move to the United States ===
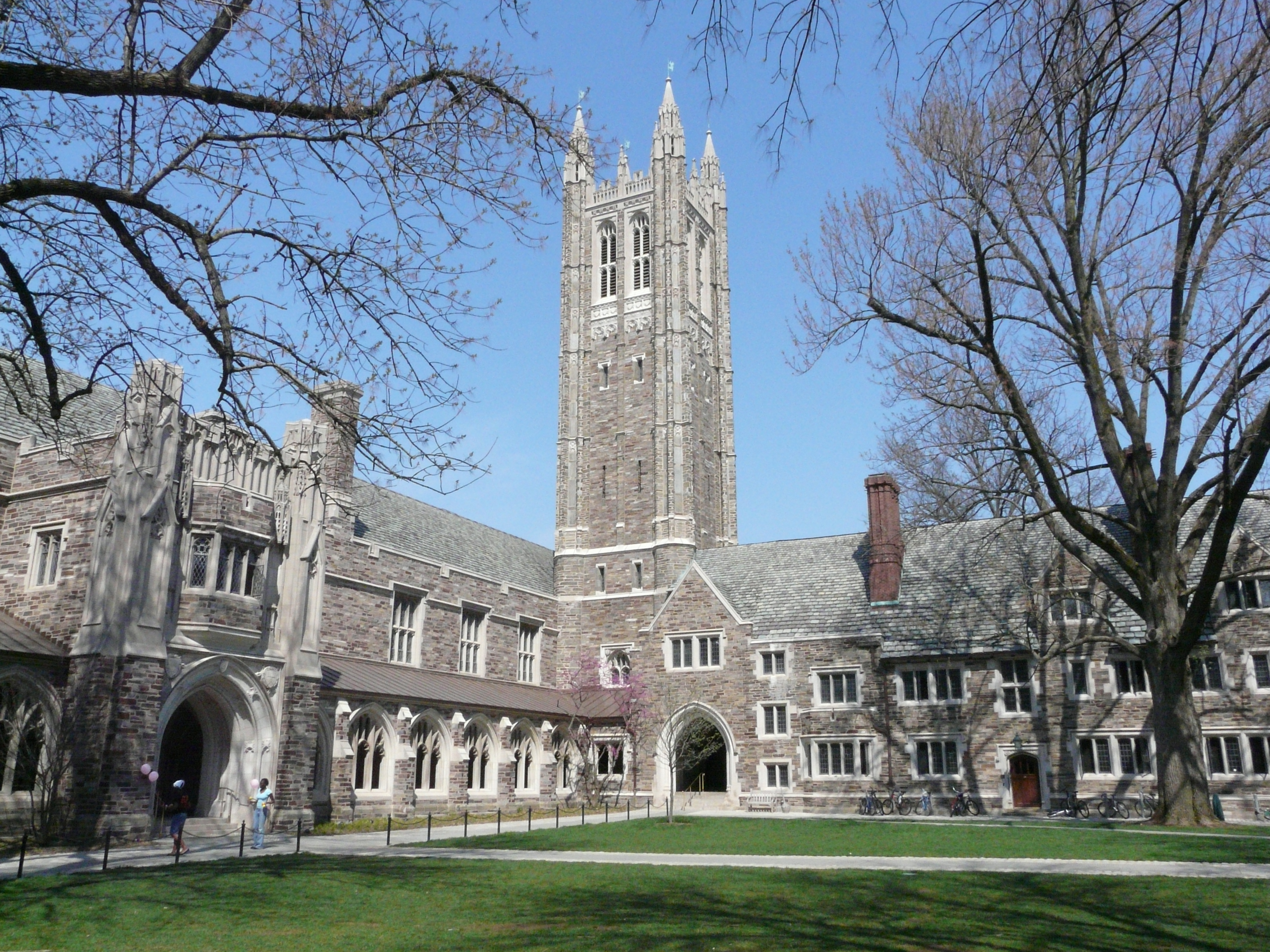
Paczyński spent most of his career abroad at Princeton University.

In 1981, Paczyński visited the United States, where he gave a series of lectures at Caltech. After the introduction of the Martial Law in Poland, aimed at countering the nascent Solidarity movement, he decided to stay abroad. He was the Lyman Spitzer Jr. Professor of Astrophysics at Princeton University and spent the rest of his professional career at this institution. Paczyński could not return to Poland fearing persecution as his decision to stay abroad was deemed illegal by the communist authorities. However, he showed deep concern for the political situation in his homeland as well as the condition of Polish science. He stayed in touch with Polish scientists, collaborating with them, sending material help and inviting them to the United States. Paczyński visited Poland only after the Fall of Communism in 1989.

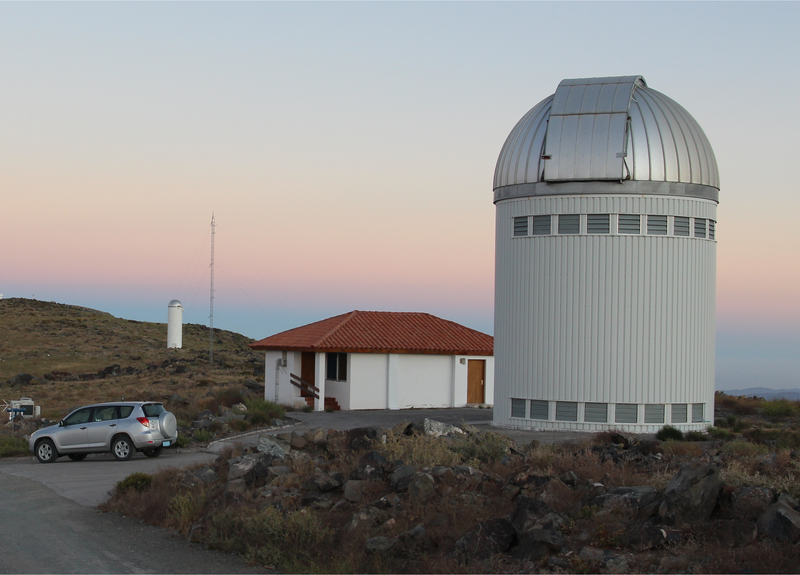
OGLE telescope at the Las Campanas Observatory.

Paczyński was the initiator of time-domain sky surveys: Optical Gravitational Lensing Experiment (OGLE, led by Andrzej Udalski of the Warsaw University Observatory) and All Sky Automated Survey (ASAS, created together with Grzegorz Pojmański). Among the OGLE team’s landmark accomplishments are the first detection of microlensing events toward the Galactic Center (1993), the first identification of a binary lens (1998), and the first observation of microlensing caused by a planetary companion (2004). His work demonstrated that stars, even the small and faint ones, could not supply enough mass to account for the gravitational binding of the Milky Way, pointing to the existence of what is now known as dark matter.

In 1999, Paczyński participated at a scientific conference held in Budapest, where he encountered Bakos Gáspár, an undergraduate student at Eötvös Loránd University, who worked on automating small astronomical telescopes. With Paczyński's support, Bakos established the HATNet Project aimed at the detection and characterization extrasolar planets.

=== Late career and distinctions ===
In 1999, Paczyński became the first astronomer to receive all three major awards of the Royal Astronomical Society, by winning the Gold Medal, having won the Eddington Medal in 1987 and the George Darwin Lectureship in 1995.

He was honoured with the title of doctor honoris causa by Wrocław University in Poland (2005) and Nicolaus Copernicus University in Toruń in Poland (2006). Paczyński received invitations from numerous universities and astronomical observatories around the world including in the United States, France, Italy, Great Britain, Japan, Russia and Yugoslavia. He was a member of the Polish Astronomical Society (1961), International Astronomical Union (1967), American Astronomical Society (1969), German National Academy of Sciences Leopoldina (1974), Royal Astronomical Society (1976), Polish Physical Society (1978), American Physical Society (1982), National Academy of Sciences (1984), and the Polish Academy of Sciences (1991, full member).

In 2006, he was awarded Henry Norris Russell Lectureship of the American Astronomical Society, "for his highly original contributions to a wide variety of fields including advanced stellar evolution, the nature of gamma ray bursts, accretion in binary systems, gravitational lensing, and cosmology. His research has been distinguished by its creativity and breadth, as well as the stimulus it has provided to highly productive observational investigations". In the same year, Paczyński attended the American Astronomical Society's conference in Calgary, where he delivered his Russel Prize lecture on the subject of "Astronomy with Small Telescopes". During his talk, he proposed the idea of installing a wide-field telescope in space between Earth and Sun aimed toward Earth, so that it could provide early warnings of potentially dangerous Near-Earth objects that might otherwise go undetected until entering the atmosphere.

He published over 200 scientific papers, which have been cited over 30,000 times by 2022, making him one of the most cited Polish scientists. Some of his notable doctoral students included Anna N. Żytkow, Marek Sikora, Robert J. Nemiroff, and Krzysztof Stanek.

== Personal life and death ==
In 1965, Paczyński married Hanna (née Adamska), his high school classmate, with whom he had two children: daughter Agnieszka (born 1967) and son Marcin (born 1974).

He died of brain cancer on April 19, 2007, in Princeton, New Jersey, after undergoing an experimental therapy, which prolonged his life by three years. He was buried in Laski near Warsaw. In 2010, Bohdan Paczyński's collected papers were donated to the Polish National Academy Archive by his wife Hanna Paczyńska. After Paczyński's death, his family has been involved in the Brain Tumor Society Ride for Research initiative.

== Contributions ==
=== Stellar evolution ===
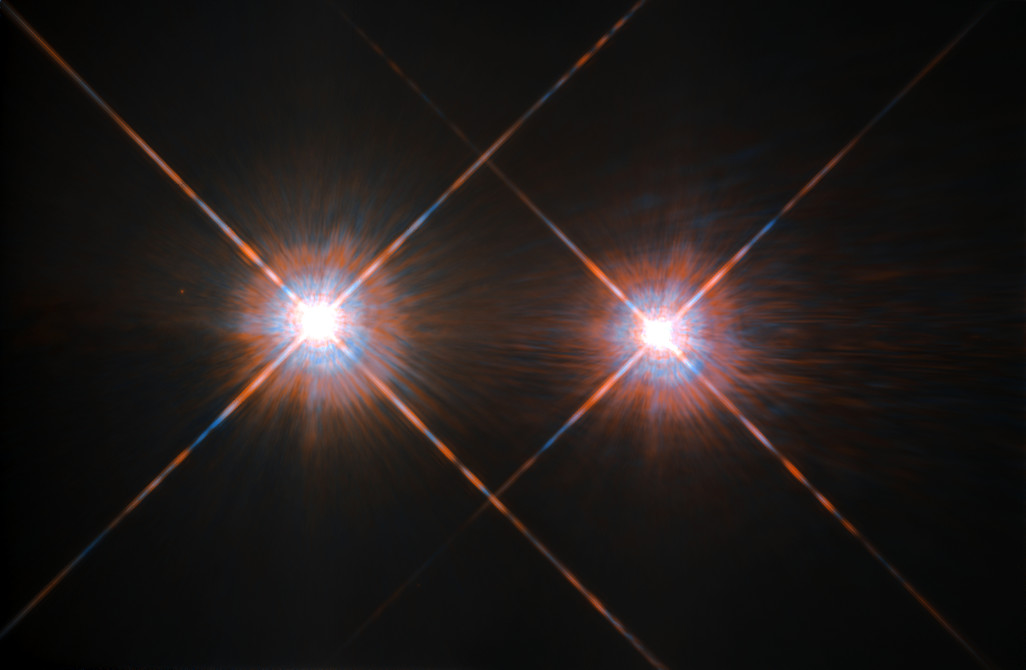
Alpha Centauri, the nearest binary star. Paczyński devoted much of his research on this type of objects in his early career.

In his early career, Paczyński's astronomical investigations concentrated on close binary star systems. In his 1967 work entitled Gravitational Waves and the Evolution of Close Binaries, Paczyński argued that angular momentum loss through gravitational wave radiation could strongly shape the evolution of close binary systems – such as dwarf and classical novae. This observation provided an indirect test for the existence of gravitational waves, preceding by seven years the discovery by Russell Alan Hulse and Joseph H. Taylor of gravitational‑radiation effects in a binary pulsar.

In his another seminal paper published the same year, Paczyński offered an explanation concerning the formation of Wolf-Rayet stars, massive heterogeneous stars with unusual spectra. He proposed that they were helium‑burning objects that had lost their hydrogen through mass transfer to a close companion. This model is now the accepted explanation for the origin of Wolf–Rayet stars.

Paczyński entered the field of numerical stellar modeling and stellar evolutionary calculations, developing his own computer programs, including the "Paczyński Code". He quickly became a leading authority on stellar structure and evolution. In his influential 1970 study, conducted during a 1968–69 stay at the Joint Institute for Laboratory Astrophysics (JILA) at the University of Colorado, he traced the evolution of a single star toward either white‑dwarf formation or carbon‑core ignition. Paczyński reported a striking numerical relation between carbon‑core mass and luminosity in the double‑shell‑burning phase. Subsequent papers explored the physics and numerics of shell burning in giant stars, the structure of planetary‑nebula nuclei, and the evolution of stars up to 60 M⊙. The use of fundamental physics to reveal how stellar interiors evolve is regarded as one of the major scientific achievements of the twentieth century, and Paczyński was widely recognized as a leader in this area.

=== Gravitational microlensing ===
Paczyński's new methods of discovering cosmic objects and measuring their mass by using gravitational lenses gained him international recognition, and he is acknowledged for coining the term "microlensing". In 1991, working with graduate student Shude Mao, Paczyński observed that the magnification produced by a gravitational lens could be highly sensitive to the presence of planets orbiting the lensing star.

His work on these techniques enabled the discovery of the first terrestrial planet beyond the Solar System and allowed scientists to estimate the mass of the stars in the Milky Way. He was also the first to argue in print that the ‘giant luminous arcs’ reported in galaxy clusters by Roger Lynds and Vahe Petrosian in 1987 were actually highly stretched, gravitationally lensed images of distant background galaxies, which was subsequently proven by many other observations of other such systems.

=== Gamma-ray bursts ===
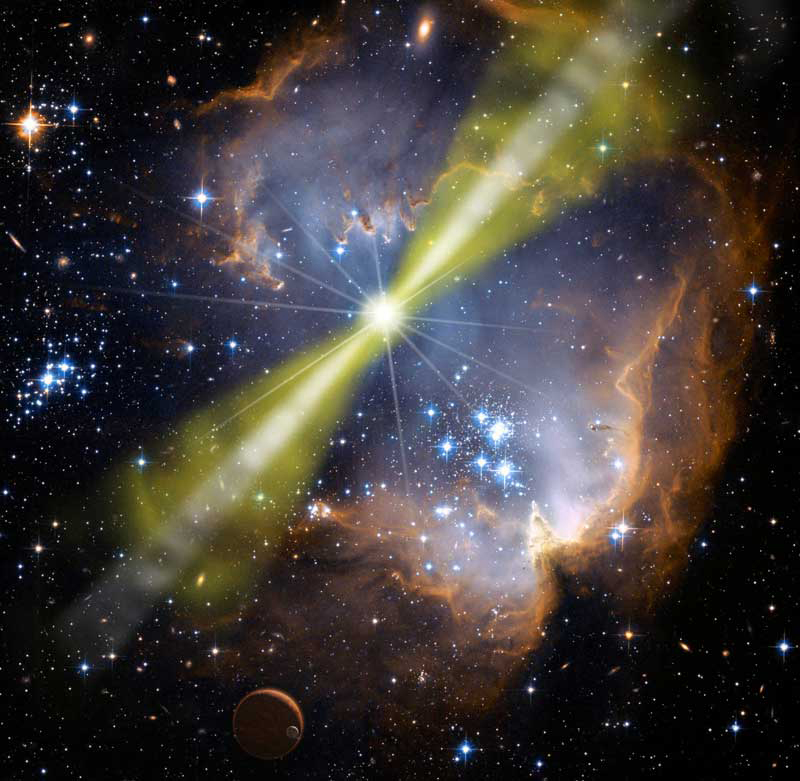
Artist's illustration of a bright gamma-ray burst occurring in a star-forming region.

Paczyński was an early proponent of the idea that gamma-ray bursts are at cosmological distances, writing a landmark paper on the subject in 1986. In 1995, on the 75th anniversary of the Great Debate between Harlow Shapley and Herbert Curtis, the Smithsonian National Museum of Natural History in Washington organized another debate on "The Distance Scale to Gamma-ray Bursts," between Paczyński, a supporter of the extragalactic origin of gamma-ray bursts, and Donald Q. Lamb who favoured the view that they are located in the Galactic Halo. The moderator of the debate, Sir Martin Rees, announced a draw but subsequent observations clearly confirmed Paczyński was right.

=== Research on accretion disks ===
Paczyński published his first research findings on accretion disks in 1977, continuing to investigate this subject for most of his later career. His contributions in this area include identifying the fact that the underlying physics naturally applies to disks around neutron stars and black holes fed by a companion or the interstellar medium. This line of work on self‑consistent disk models eventually led to the ‘thick‑disk’ configurations later known as the "Polish doughnut models.” In 1980, his collaboration in the field of accretion disks with Paul Wiita led to the introduction of the Paczynski-Wiita potential, an approximation of the gravitational potential around a non-rotating black hole.

== Awards and recognition ==
- 1979 – Invited Discourse at the 17th General Assembly of the International Astronomical Union in Montreal
- 1980 – First-Class State Award (Poland)
- 1981 – Karl Schwarzschild Medal of Astronomische Gesellschaft
- 1982 – Jurzykowski Prize conferred by the Alfred Jurzykowski Foundation in New York
- 1985 – Medaille de l’Adion from the Nice Observatory
- 1987 – Eddington Medal of the Royal Astronomical Society for investigations of outstanding merit in theoretical astrophysics
- 1992 – Heineman Prize of the American Astronomical Society and American Institute of Physics
- 1994 – Morris Loeb Lectureship at Harvard University
- 1995 – George Darwin Lectureship granted by the Royal Astronomical Society
- 1996 – Prize of the Foundation for Polish Science
- 1997 – Henry Draper Medal of the National Academy of Sciences
- 1998 – Antoinette de Vaucouleurs Memorial Lectureship and Medal by the University of Texas at Austin
- 1999 – Gold Medal of the Royal Astronomical Society
- 1999 – Marc Aaronson Memorial Lectureship of the University of Arizona Department of Astronomy
- 1999 – Thomas Gold Lectureship at Cornell University
- 2000 – Bruno Rossi Prize of the High Energy Astrophysics division of the American Astronomical Society
- 2000 – Marian Smoluchowski Medal of the Polish Physical Society
- 2002 – Bruce Medal of the Astronomical Society of the Pacific for outstanding lifetime contributions to astronomy
- 2005 – Honorary degree of the University of Wrocław
- 2006 – Honorary degree of the Nicolaus Copernicus University in Toruń
- 2006 – Henry Norris Russell Lectureship the American Astronomical Society in recognition of a lifetime of excellence in astronomical research
- 2007 – Commander's Cross with Star of the Order of Polonia Restituta

Named after him:

- Asteroid 11755 Paczynski
- One of ASAS-SN telescopes, located in CTIO, Chile
- Bohdan Paczynski Visitor program, Princeton University. Past scholars include Joachim Wambsganss (2008), Yasushi Suto (2009), Steven Balbus (2010).
- Bohdan Paczyński Medal of the Polish Astronomical Society
- Bohdan Paczyński Memorial Colloquium, a lecture delivered at the Nicolaus Copernicus University in Toruń

== See also ==
- Paczyński–Wiita potential
- List of Polish astronomers
- Timeline of Polish science and technology
