= Astronarium =

Polish documentary and popular science television series

- Created by: Polish Television, Polish Astronomical Society
- Country of origin: Poland
- Original language: Polish
- No. of seasons: 7
- No. of episodes: 178

Production
- Running time: 23 minutes

Original release
- Network: TVP 1, TVP 3, TVP Polonia, TVP Nauka
- Release: March 2, 2015 – present

Astronarium is a Polish documentary and popular science television series about astronomy and space research. The program is produced by the Polish Television and Polish Astronomical Society, with support from the Polish Ministry of Science and Higher Education. The series premiered on March 2, 2015 on the TVP Regionalna channel (now the name of this channel is TVP 3). It has been broadcast on various channels in Poland and abroad, including TVP 1, TVP 3, TVP Polonia. The episodes are also available on the internet as a VOD, some of them with English subtitles. The cumulative audience in Poland during the first week of emission of an episode is on the level of 500,000 viewers (RCH parameter).

The first season of 8 episodes was first broadcast from March to April 2015, the second season of 13 episodes from September 2015 to March 2016, the third season of 13 episodes started in April 2016.

Format of the series is about visiting science institutes and astronomical observatories, where scientists involved in research are explaining various topics about astronomy and space research. The series uses also CGI renderings, video footage, photographs. Each episode is about a particular topic.

Astronarium is also available at YouTube where it reached 100,000 subscribers on 23 October 2020, and the most popular episode reached 1 million views on 18 October 2020.

On January 15, 2018, Astronarium was a winner in "Media" category of the "Popularyzator Nauki 2017" contest organized by the Polish Press Agency and the Ministry of Science and Higher Education. Astronarium received Silver YouTube Creator Award in 2020.

== Season 1 ==
List of episodes:

No.	English title	Original Polish title	Premiere
1	Radio Astronomy	Radioastronomia	March 2, 2015
2	BRITE Satellites	Satelity BRITE	March 9, 2015
3	Meteorites	Meteoryty	March 16, 2015
4	Amateur Astronomy	Astronomia amatorska	March 23, 2015
5	Cataclysmic Stars	Gwiazdy kataklizmiczne	March 30, 2015
6	Solar Activity	Aktywność słoneczna	April 13, 2015
7	European Southern Observatory	Europejskie Obserwatorium Południowe	April 20, 2015
8	ALMA Observatory	Obserwatorium ALMA	April 27, 2015

== Season 2 ==
List of episodes:

No.	English title	Original Polish title	Premiere
9	OGLE Project	Projekt OGLE	September 5, 2015
10	Variable Stars	Gwiazdy zmienne	September 19, 2015
11	Amateur Observatories	Obserwatoria społeczne	October 3, 2015
12	Polish Space Industry	Polski przemysł kosmiczny	October 10, 2015
13	Asteroseismology	Asterosejsmologia	October 31, 2015
14	Gamma Ray Bursts	Rozbłyski gamma	November 14, 2015
15	Comets	Komety	November 28, 2015
16	Computers in Astronomy	Komputery w astronomii	December 12, 2015
17	Star of Bethlehem	Gwiazda Betlejemska	January 9, 2016
18	Distances in the Universe	Odległości we Wszechświecie	January 23, 2016
19	Time	Czas	February 6, 2016
20	Collisions of Stars	Zderzenia gwiazd	February 20, 2016
21	Planets Around Pulsars	Planety wokół pulsara	March 19, 2016

== Season 3 ==
List of episodes:

No.	English title	Original Polish title	Premiere
22	Extrasolar Planets	Planety pozasłoneczne	April 16, 2016
23	Astronomy in School	Astronomia w szkole	April 30, 2016
24	Copernicus's Astronomy	Astronomia Kopernika	May 14, 2016
25	Extrasolar Planetary Systems	Układy planetarne	May 28, 2016
26	Gravitational Waves	Fale grawitacyjne	June 11, 2016
27	Large Hadron Collider - Origin of Matter	Wielki Zderzacz Hadronów - początki materii	September 7, 2016
28	LOFAR Radio Telescope	Radioteleskop LOFAR	September 21, 2016
29	Planetariums	Planetaria	October 5, 2016
30	Gravitation	Grawitacja	October 19, 2016
31	Microwave Background Radiation	Mikrofalowe promieniowanie tła	November 2, 2016
32	Dark Matter	Ciemna materia	November 16, 2016
33	Life in the Universe	Życie we Wszechświecie	November 30, 2016
34	Special Episode	Odcinek specjalny	December 14, 2016

== Season 4 ==
List of episodes:

No.	English title	Original Polish title	Premiere
35	The Wave 21 cm	Fala 21 cm	May 24, 2017
36	Proxima b and TRAPPIST-1	Proxima b i TRAPPIST-1	June 14, 2017
37	Expanding Universe	Ekspansja Wszechświata	June 28, 2017
38	Grave of Copernicus	Grób Kopernika	July 12, 2017
39	Missing Baryons	Brakujące bariony	July 26, 2017
40	Cherenkov Telescope Array	Projekt CTA	August 8, 2017
41	Quasars	Kwazary	August 23, 2017
42	Extremely Large Telescope	Ekstremalnie Wielki Teleskop	September 2, 2017
43	Popular Astronomy	Astronomia popularna	September 16, 2017
44	General Relativity	Ogólna teoria względności	September 30, 2017
45	Astronautics	Kosmonautyka	October 14, 2017
46	Bohdan Paczyński	Bohdan Paczyński	October 28, 2017
47	Pulsars	Pulsary	November 11, 2017
48	The First Kilonova - A Breakthrough in Astronomy	Pierwsza kilonowa - przełom w astronomii	November 25, 2017
49	Saturn and Cassini Mission	Saturn i sonda Cassini	December 9, 2017
50	Milky Way	Droga Mleczna	December 23, 2017
51	Special episode	Astronomiczne przeboje roku 2017	January 6, 2018
52	Poles at ESO	Polacy w ESO	January 20, 2018
53	Asteroids	Planetoidy	February 3, 2018
54	Dwarf Planets	Planety karłowate	February 17, 2018
55	Supernovae	Supernowe	March 8, 2018
56	Masers	Kosmiczne masery	March 22, 2018
57	Galaxy Evolution	Ewolucja galaktyk	April 5, 2018
58	Jets	Kosmiczne dżety	April 19, 2018
59	Hubble Space Telescope	Kosmiczny Teleskop Hubble'a	May 3, 2018
60	ESO Supernova	ESO Supernova	May 17, 2018
61	Space Junk	Kosmiczne śmieci	May 31, 2018
62	Near Earth Objects (NEO)	NEO - Obiekty bliskie Ziemi	June 14, 2018
63	Space Law	Prawo kosmiczne	June 28, 2018
64	Mars	Mars	July 12, 2018
65	Space Weather	Pogoda kosmiczna	July 26, 2018
66	Big Bang	Wielki Wybuch	August 9, 2018
67	The Moon	Księżyc	23.08.2018
68	International Astronomical Union	Międzynarodowa Unia Astronomiczna	20.09.2018
69	Astrophotography	Astrofotografia	4.10.2018
70	Spectroscopy	Spektroskopia	18.10.2018
71	Missions to Jupiter	Misje do Jowisza	8.11.2018
72	Star Clusters	Gromady gwiazd	22.11.2018
73	Neutron Stars	Gwiazdy neutronowe	6.12.2018
74	Coronium and Nebulium - Elements Which Do Not Exist	Koronium i nebulium - pierwiastki, których nie ma	13.12.2018
75	Evolution of Stars	Ewolucja gwiazd	
76	Special Episode	Najciekawsze rozmowy 2018	10.01.2019
77	Black Holes	Czarne dziury	

== Season 5 ==
List of episodes:

No.	English title	Original Polish title	Premiere
78	The First Image of Black Hole	Pierwszy obraz czarnej dziury	11.07.2019
79	Extraterrestrial Civilizations	Cywilizacje pozaziemskie	25.07.2019
80	Sun's Corona	Korona słoneczna	8.08.2019
81	Books of Copernicus	Księgi Kopernika	22.08.2019
82	Map of Milky Way	Mapa Drogi Mlecznej	5.09.2019
83	Quantum Communication	Komunikacja kwantowa	18.09.2019
84	Gravitational Waves - New Research	Fale grawitacyjne - nowe badania	3.10.2019
85	Dark Sky Protection	Ochrona ciemnego nieba	17.10.2019
86	Astronomical Organizations	Organizacje astronomiczne	31.10.2019
87	New Polish Satellites	Nowe polskie satelity	14.11.2019
88	Very Long Baseline Interferometry (VLBI)	Interferometria wielkobazowa	28.11.2019
89	Searching for the Second Earth	Poszukiwania drugiej Ziemi	12.12.2019
90	Origin of Elements	Pochodzenie pierwiastków	2.01.2020
91	In the Footsteps of General Relativity	Śladami ogólnej teorii względności	9.01.2020
92	Stellar Dust	Gwiezdny pył	23.01.2020
93	ATHENA Space Telescope	Kosmiczny teleskop ATHENA	6.02.2020
94	Supernova 1987A	Supernowa 1987A	20.02.2020
95	Noble Prizes 2019	Noble 2019	5.03.2020
96	Surface of the Sun	Powierzchnia Słońca	19.03.2020
97	Planets from Canary Islands	Planety z Wysp Kanaryjskich	16.04.2020
98	Back to the Moon	Powrót na Księżyc	24.05.2020
99	Einstein's Time and Space	Czas i przestrzeń Einsteina	14.06.2020
100	100 Years of Astrophysics	100 lat astrofizyki	12.07.2020
101	Gaia Mission	Misja Gaia	26.07.2020
102	Astronavigation	Astronawigacja	23.08.2020
103	Comet C/2020 F3 NEOWISE	Kometa C/2020 F3 NEOWISE	4.09.2020
104	Transients	Zjawiska tymczasowe	18.09.2020
105	Weather Satellites	Satelity meteorologiczne	2.10.2020
106	Polish Rockets	Polskie rakiety	16.10.2020
107	Contact Binaries	Gwiazdy kontaktowe	30.11.2020
108	Life on Venus?	Życie na Wenus?	13.11.2020
109	The Puzzle of Venus and Earth	Zagadka Wenus i Ziemi	27.11.2020
110	Light Polarisation in Space	Polaryzacja światła w kosmosie	11.12.2020
111	Fast Radio Bursts	Szybkie błyski radiowe	25.12.2020
112	Noble Prizes for Black Holes	Noble za czarne dziury	22.01.2021
113	Arecibo Heritage	Dziedzictwo Arecibo	5.02.2021
114	Space Dynamo	Kosmiczne dynamo	19.02.2021
115	Hubble Constant	Stała Hubble'a	5.03.2021
116	Perseverance and Mysteries of Mars	Perseverance i tajemnice Marsa	19.03.2021
117	Cosmic Distance Ladder	Kosmiczna drabina odległości	2.04.2021
118	Constellations	Gwiazdozbiory	16.04.2021
119	Commercial Space	Komercyjny kosmos	2.05.2021
120	Cosmic Rays	Promieniowanie kosmiczne	16.05.2021
121	Deep Sky Surveys	Głębokie przeglądy nieba	30.05.2021

== Season 6 ==
List of episodes

No.	English title	Original Polish title	Premiere
122	Cosmic Water Journey	Kosmiczna podróż wody	13.06.2021
123	Extrasolar Visitors	Pozasłoneczni przybysze	26.06.2021
124	Impact Craters	Kratery uderzeniowe	19.09.2021
125	Archaeoastronomy	Archeoastronomia	3.10.2021
126	Universe of Lem	Kosmos Lema	16.10.2021
127	Navigation Satellites	Satelity nawigacyjne	31.10.2021
128	Outskirts of the Solar System	Rubieże Układu Słonecznego	14.11.2021
129	Dark Energy	Ciemna energia	28.11.2021
130	Heliosphere	Heliosfera	12.12.2021
131	Extrasolar Weather	Pozaziemska pogoda	26.12.2021
132	Launch of the James Webb Space Telescope	Start Teleskopu Jamesa Webba	23.01.2022
133	Goals of the James Webb Space Telescope	Cele Teleskopu Jamesa Webba	6.02.2022
134	Active Galaxies	Aktywne jądra galaktyk	20.02.2022
135	Brown Dwarfs	Brązowe karły	6.03.2022
136	Astronomical Alerts	Alerty astronomiczne	
137	Unusual Planets	Niezwykłe planety	
138	Novae	Gwiazdy nowe	
139	Moon's Oceans	Księżycowe oceany	
140	Planetary Nebulae	Mgławice planetarne	
141	Discoverers of 51 Pegasi b	Odkrywcy 51 Pegasi b	
142	Searching for the First Stars	Poszukiwania pierwszych gwiazd	
143	Supermassive Black Holes	Supermasywne czarne dziury	
144	False Discoveries	Fałszywe odkrycia	
145	New Polish Observatories	Nowe polskie obserwatoria	
146	Milky Way Neighborhood	Sąsiedztwo Drogi Mlecznej	

== Season 7 ==
List of episodes

No.	English title	Original Polish title	Premiere
147	The First Photos from the James Webb Space Telescope	Pierwsze zdjęcia z Teleskopu Webba	
148	DART mission	Misja DART	
149	New Data from Gaia Mission	Nowe dane sondy Gaia	
150	Rogue Black Holes	Swobodne czarne dziury	
151	Space Mining	Górnictwo kosmiczne	
152	Flight to Mars	Lot na Marsa	
153	Event Horizon	Horyzont zdarzeń	
154	White Dwarfs	Białe karły	
155	CREDO	CREDO	
156	Origin of Water	Pochodzenie wody	
157	Primordial Black Holes	Pierwotne czarne dziury	
158	Copernican Revolution	Rewolucja kopernikańska	
159	Polish Participation in JUICE Mission	Polski udział w misji JUICE	
160	The Largest Mission to Jupiter	Największa misja do Jowisza	
161	Planetary Seismology	Sejsmologia planetarna	
162	Extreme Phenomena in Planetary Atmospheres	Ekstremalne zjawiska w atmosferach planet	
163	De Revolutionibus	De Revolutionibus	
164	Airborne Observatory SOFIA	Lotnicze obserwatorium SOFIA	
165	Ariane Launchers	Rakiety Ariane	
166	Gravitational Waves Background	Tło fal grawitacyjnych	
167	Microwave Trace of the Big Bang	Mikrofalowy ślad Wielkiego Wybuchu	
168	Hubble Tension	Hubble Tension	
169	Sunspots	Plamy słoneczne	
170	Where Rockets Take Off From	Skąd startują rakiety	
171	Anthropic Principle	Zasada antropiczna	
