= Marek Sikora (astronomer) =

Polish astronomer

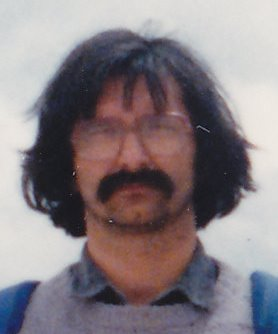
Marek Sikora

Marek Sikora is a Polish astronomer.

He achieved his Habilitation of astrophysics in 1990 from University of Warsaw. He received the title of professor in 1999. Currently he works as a professor in the Centrum Astronomiczne im. Mikołaja Kopernika PAN, Polish Academy of Sciences in Warsaw. He is interested mainly high-energy astrophysics, astrophysical jets, the nuclei of active galaxies, and sources of cosmic radiation.

== Published works ==
- 2008, 3C 454.3 Reveals the structure and physics of its Blazar zone, The Astrophysical Journal, 675, pp. 71, 2008 Marek Jan Sikora, Rafal Moderski, Gregory Maria Madejski
- 2008 Multiwavelength Observations of the Powerful Gamma-Ray Quasar PKS 1510-089: Clues on the Jet Composition, The Astrophysical Journal, 672, pp. 787, 2008 Marek Jan Sikora, Rafal Moderski, Kataoka et al. (Sikora, M .; Moderski, R.)
- 2008 Radio-loudness of Active Galaxies and the Black Hole Evolution, New Astronomy Reviews, 51, pp. 891, 2008 Marek Jan Sikora, Lukasz Stawarz, JP Lasota
- 2007 Radio-loudness of active galactic nuclei: observational facts and Theoretical implications, The Astrophysical Journal, 658, pp. 815, 2007 Marek Jan Sikora, Lukasz Stawarz, JP Lasota
- 2007 On Magnetic Field in Broad-line Blazars, Proceedings "Recontre de Moriond" 2007 Marek Jan Sikora, Rafal Moderski,
- 2007, Radio loudness of AGNs: host galaxy morphology and the spin paradigm Proceedings of "Extragalactic Jets: Theory and Observations from Radio is Gamma Rays", 2007, Marek Jan Sikora, Lukasz Stawarz, JP Lasota
- 2006 Dynamics and high-energy emission of the flaring HST-1 wick in the M87 jet, Monthly Noticies of the RAS, 370, p. 981, 2006 Marek Jan Sikora, Lukasz Stawarz, F. Aharonian, Kataoka J. Ostrowski M., Siemiginowska A.
- 2005 Klein-Nishina effects in the spectra of non-thermal sources immersed in external radiation fields, Monthly Noticies of the RAS, 363, p. 954, 2005 Marek Jan Sikora, Rafal Moderski, Coppi PS Aharonian, F.
