= Polish Astronomical Society =

Scientific organization

- Abbreviation: PTA
- Formation: 1923
- Type: Learned society
- Headquarters: Warsaw
- Region served: Poland
- President: Marek Sarna
- Website: www.pta.edu.pl

The Polish Astronomical Society (Polish: Polskie Towarzystwo Astronomiczne, PTA) is science society in Poland, founded in 1923, with headquarters in Warsaw. Members of PTA are professional astronomers. Purpose of the association is promoting the development of astronomical science, their teaching and outreach in community. PTA is involved in publishing astronomical books, as well as popular science magazine Urania - Postępy Astronomii. PTA is also a producer of a TV series Astronarium about astronomy and space. The society organizes conferences and contests. Current President of PTA is Marek Sarna and number of members is around 280. Polish Astronomical Society is a member of the European Astronomical Society.

Since 2003, the Polish Astronomical Society has been presenting scientists with the Bohdan Paczyński Medal for significant contributions to astronomy and astrophysics as well as the Włodzimierz Zonn Prize (since 1983) for popularizing the knowledge of the universe.

== See also ==
- List of astronomical societies
