= Astrophysics Source Code Library =

Astronomy and astrophysics software library

The Astrophysics Source Code Library (ASCL) is an online registry of scientist-written software used in astronomy or astrophysics research. The primary objective of the ASCL is to make the software used in research available for examination to improve the transparency of research.

Entries in the ASCL are indexed by the SAO/NASA Astrophysics Data System (ADS) and Web of Science's Data Citation Index and because each code is assigned a unique ascl ID, software can be cited in a journal paper even when there is no citable paper describing the code. Web of Science and ADS indexing makes research software more discoverable. Additionally, ADS can link some papers which use codes to the code entries, which makes it easier to examine the computational methods used. ADS also tracks citations for software (assuming the citations are formatted correctly), which can help research software authors for whom citations are an important measure.

Entries in the ASCL include the name, description, author of the code, ascl ID, and either a link to a download site for the software or an attached archive file for the software so the code can be downloaded directly from the ASCL. A link to a paper describing or using the software is usually included as well to demonstrate that the software has been used in refereed research.

== History ==
- Established in 1999 by Robert J. Nemiroff and John Wallin
- Migrated to APOD discussion forum Starship Asterisk* in 2010
- Advisory committee formed in 2011
- ADS started indexing entries in 2012
- New database and site in production in 2014

== Advisory Committee ==
Peter Teuben, University of Maryland, Chair
Bruce Berriman, California Institute of Technology
Jessica Mink, Center for Astrophysics | Harvard & Smithsonian
Robert J. Nemiroff, Michigan Technological University
Rein Warmels, European Southern Observatory
Lior Shamir, Lawrence Technological University
Keith Shortridge, Australian Astronomical Observatory
John Wallin, Middle Tennessee State University

Previous Advisory Committee Members
Mark Taylor, University of Bristol, UK (2011–2018)
Thomas Robitaille, Freelance (2016)
Robert J. Hanisch, National Institute of Standards and Technology (2011–2015)

== Editors ==
Editor: Alice Allen
Associate Editor: Kim DuPrie
Assistant Editor: Catherine Gosmeyer
Designer/Developer: Judy Schmidt
