= All Sky Automated Survey =

Astronomical survey

- Alternative names: ASAS
- Website: www.astrouw.edu.pl/asas/

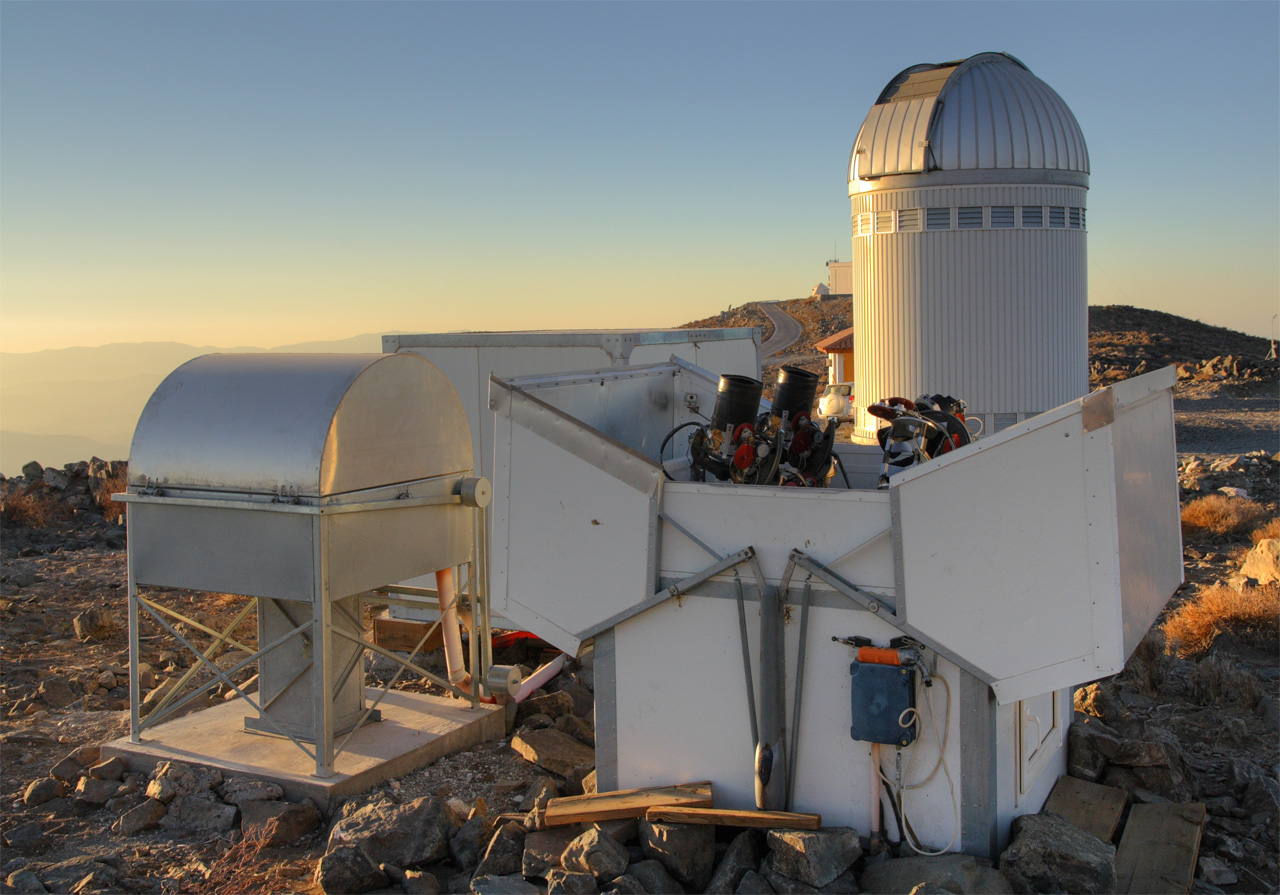
ASAS telescopes at Las Campanas Observatory. OGLE telescope visible in background.

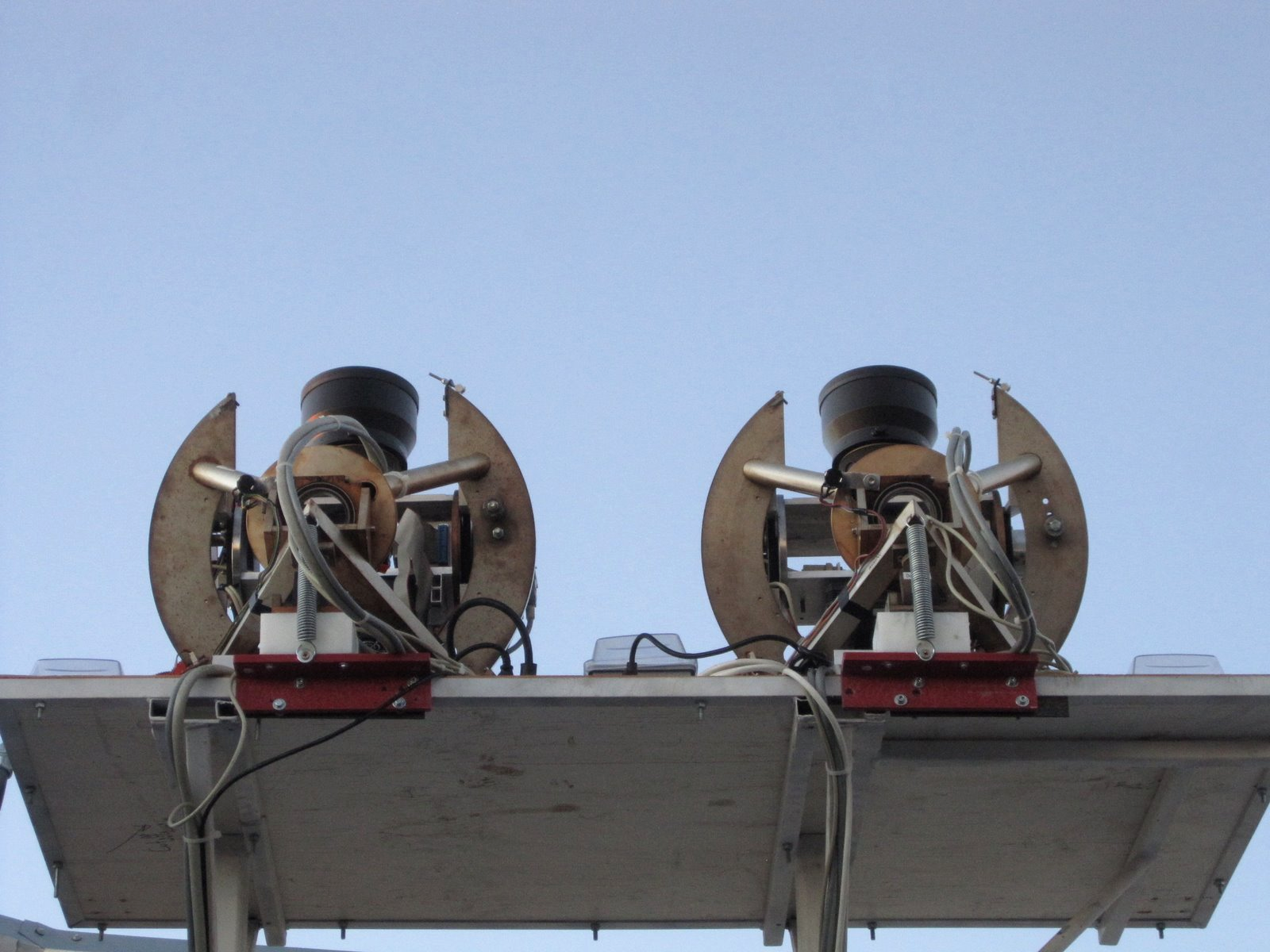
ASAS-North telescopes at Haleakala, Maui, HI

The All Sky Automated Survey (ASAS) is a Polish project implemented on 7 April 1997 to do photometric monitoring of approximately 20 million stars brighter than magnitude 14 all over the sky. The automatic telescopes discovered two new comets in 2004 and 2006. The ASAS-South, located in Chile and ASAS-North, located in Hawai'i, are managed by Grzegorz Pojmański of the Warsaw University Observatory via the internet.

The idea was initiated by the Polish astronomy Professor Bohdan Paczyński of Princeton University. The prototype instrument and data pipeline were designed and built by Grzegorz Pojmański. The work on the ASAS program began in 1996 with a mere $1 million budget. The automatic telescope, located in Las Campanas Observatory, Chile, was designed to register the brightness of circa one million stars in the Southern Hemisphere. However, it proved very efficient and helped to find many new variable stars. The project was then expanded, and now operates four telescopes located in Las Campanas Observatory. The Chilean observatory is operated by the Carnegie Institution of Washington.

So far, ASAS has discovered 50,000 variables located south of declination +28°, which means that it has covered 3/4 of all the sky. Pojmański comes to Chile only once every year. The telescope works automatically. Routine work such as exchanging of the data is done by the Optical Gravitational Lensing Experiment (OGLE) observers. Such an intervention is needed once a week. On each starry night when an OGLE observator opens or closes the dome, the ASAS booth is opened or closed automatically.

Grzegorz Pojmański is supported in the project by the State Committee for Scientific Research, Poland. The project is assisted by OGLE observers. Paczyński was supported by William Golden.

== The ASAS 1-2 systems ==
The prototype ASAS instrument, equipped with 768x512 Kodak CCD and 135/1.8 telephoto lens, and mounted on the computer controlled robotic mount, operated from 7 April 1997 until 6 June 2000. Prototype took about 15 3-minute exposures (covering 90 sq. deg.) per hour (over 120 per night) with limiting I-magnitude 13 and resolution of 14 arcsec/pixel. Initial setup consisted of 24 fields covering 150 sq. deg. (later increased to 50 fields - 300 sq. deg) monitored few times each night.

ASAS 2 results obtained during 1997-2000 available at the ASAS website contain:

- The ASAS-2 Photometric I-band Catalog - giving interactive access to over 50 million measurements of over 140,000 stars,
- Sky Atlas - graphic interface to the I-band Catalog,
- The ASAS-2 Catalog of Variable Stars containing over 350 Periodic and 3500 Miscellaneous variables,
- The ASAS Gallery presenting collection of the variables' light curves.

== The ASAS-3 system ==
On 6 June 2000 the ASAS-3 system replaced the low-cost prototype. It consists of two wide-field 200/2.8 instruments, one narrow-field 750/3.3 telescope and one super-wide 50/4 scope. Each of them is equipped with the Apogee 2Kx2K CCD camera, located in the custom-made automated enclosure.

In April 2002 ASAS-3 was expanded and is now housing four instruments. The fourth one is a very-wide-field scope equipped with the 50 mm lens and another AP-10 camera. It features 36x26 deg. FOV and observes only a few selected fields in purpose to test instrument sensitivity for fast transient events.

ASAS-3 is directly connected to the BACODINE General Coordinates Network and is ready for immediate follow-up observations of GRB events.

ASAS-3 results obtained since the year 2000 are available at the ASAS website.

- The ASAS-3 Catalog of Variable Stars containing over 10,000 eclipsing binaries, almost 8,000 periodic pulsating and over 31,000 irregular stars found among 15,000,000 stars on the sky south of the declination +28.

== Selected discoveries ==
Number of stars observed by ASAS: approx. 15 million. Number of detected variables: approx. 50,000. Number of new variables: approx. 39,000.

=== Comets ===
- C/2006 A1 (Pojmański) - the new comet was discovered by the ASAS Alert System on 2 January 2006 on the image taken on 1 January. Confirmation images were taken on 4 January, and one prediscovery image was identified on 29 December 2005.
- C/2004 R2 (ASAS) - the new comet was discovered by the ASAS Alert System on 7 September 2004. Confirmation images were taken on 8 September and one prediscovery image was identified on 1 September.

=== Novae ===
- Nova SMC = ASAS 011500-7325.6 (predisc. autom. detect.)
- V1663 Aql = Nova Aql = ASAS 190512+0514.2 (ASAS discovery)
- V378 Ser = Nova Ser 2005 = ASAS 174924-1300.0 (ASAS discovery)
- V5114 Sgr = Nova Sgr 2004 = ASAS 181932-2836.6 (predisc. autom. detection)
- V2574 Oph = Nova Oph 2004 = ASAS 173845-2328.3 (predisc. autom. detection)
- V1186 Sco = Nova Sco 2004 = ASAS 171251-3056.6 (ASAS discovery)
- V1188 Sco = Nova Sco 2005 = ASAS 174422-3416.5 (ASAS discovery)
- V477 Sct = Nova Sct 2005 Number 2 = ASAS 183843-1216.3

=== Dwarf Novae ===
- ASAS 160048-4846.2 - UGSU in Nor (ASAS discovery) (= V453 Normae)
- ASAS 091858-2942.6 - CV in Pyx (ASAS discovery) (= DT Pyxidis)
- ASAS 153616-0839.1 - UGWZ (ASAS discovery) (= QZ Librae)
- ASAS 002511+1217.2 - UGWZ/UGSU ? (ASAS discovery) (= FL Piscium)

(predisc. autom. detection) = object was independently detected by the ASAS Alert System before official discovery, but was not verified by a human until later.

== ASAS Alert System ==
Since 1 March 2003 the ASAS data reduction pipeline is working in real time. All photometric data is available through a web interface within 5 minutes after exposure.

== ASAS publications ==
- Eclipsing binaries in ASAS catalog by B. Paczyński, D. Szczygieł, B. Pilecki, G. Pojmański
- The All Sky Automated Survey. The Catalog of Variable Stars. V. Declinations 0 deg - 28 deg of the Northern Hemisphere by G. Pojmański, B. Pilecki, D. Szczygieł
- The All Sky Automated Survey. The Catalog of Variable Stars. IV.18^h - 24^h Quarter of the Southern Hemisphere by G. Pojmański, Gracjan Maciejewski
- The All Sky Automated Survey. The Catalog of Variable Stars. III. 12h - 18h Quarter of the Southern Hemisphere by G. Pojmański, Gracjan Maciejewski
- The All Sky Automated Survey. The Catalog of Variable Stars. II.6h-12h Quarter of the Southern Hemisphere by G. Pojmański
- The All Sky Automated Survey. A Catalog of almost 3900 variable stars by G. Pojmański
- The All Sky Automated Survey. Variable Stars in the 0h - 6h Quarter of the Southern Hemisphere by G.Pojmański
- The All Sky Automated Survey. The Catalog of the Short Period Variable Stars in the Selected Fields by G. Pojmański
- The All Sky Automated Survey by G. Pojmański
