= Aneta Siemiginowska =

Polish-American astrophysicist

Aneta Siemiginowska is a Polish-American astrophysicist whose research involves high-energy cosmic objects including supermassive black hole, quasars, blazars, active galaxies, and astrophysical jets. She works at the Center for Astrophysics | Harvard & Smithsonian as a senior astrophysicist in the Chandra X-ray Center.

== Education and career ==
Siemiginowska wanted to be an astronomer from a very young age. She has a master's degree from the University of Warsaw, and a Ph.D. from the Nicolaus Copernicus Astronomical Center of the Polish Academy of Sciences. She came to the Harvard–Smithsonian Center for Astrophysics as a postdoctoral researcher, before obtaining a staff astrophysicist position there.

== Recognition ==
Siemiginowska was named a Legacy Fellow of the American Astronomical Society in 2020.
