= Grzegorz Pojmański =

Polish astronomer

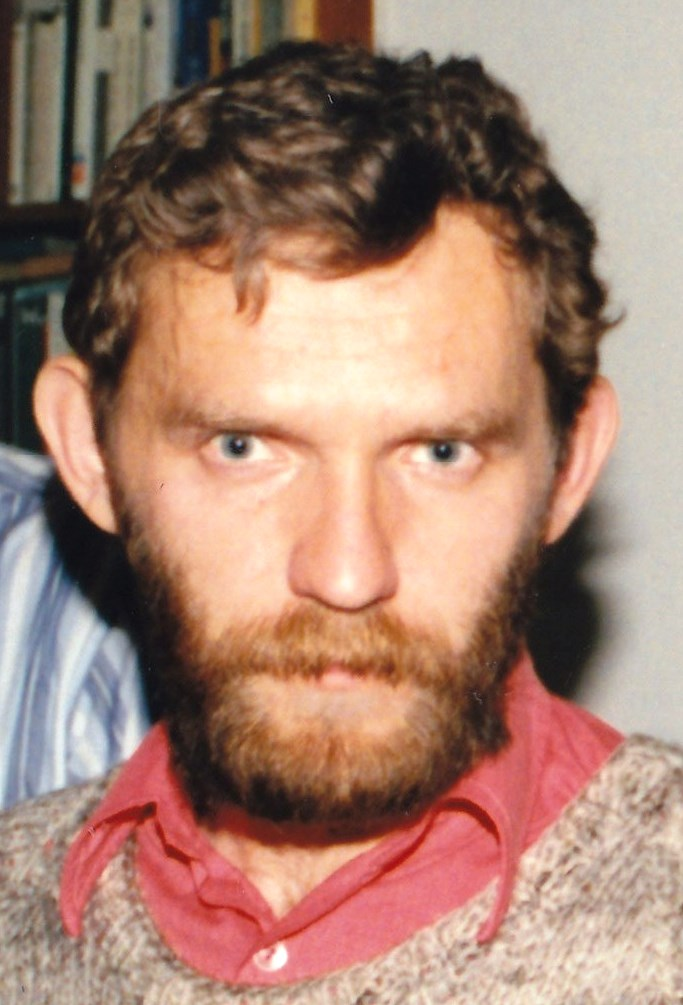
Grzegorz Pojmański

Grzegorz Pojmański (born April 16, 1959, in Warsaw), is a Polish astronomer and professor at the Warsaw University Astronomical Observatory, Poland. In 1997 Pojmański together with professor Bohdan Paczyński implemented the project All Sky Automated Survey (ASAS). With the ASAS Alert System Pojmański discovered two new comets: C/2004 R2 (ASAS) and C/2006 A1 (Pojmański). Pojmański connects with the ASAS automatic telescope located in Las Campanas Observatory, Chile, via Internet.

== Publications ==
- Eclipsing binaries in ASAS catalog by B. Paczynski, D. Szczygiel, B. Pilecki, G. Pojmański
- The All Sky Automated Survey. The Catalog of Variable Stars. V. Declinations 0 deg - 28 deg of the Northern Hemisphere by G. Pojmański, B. Pilecki, D. Szczygiel
- The All Sky Automated Survey. The Catalog of Variable Stars. IV.18^h - 24^h Quarter of the Southern Hemisphere by G. Pojmański, Gracjan Maciejewski
- The All Sky Automated Survey. The Catalog of Variable Stars. III. 12h - 18h Quarter of the Southern Hemisphere by G. Pojmański, Gracjan Maciejewski
- The All Sky Automated Survey. The Catalog of Variable Stars. II.6h-12h Quarter of the Southern Hemisphere by G. Pojmański
- The All Sky Automated Survey. A Catalog of almost 3900 variable stars by G. Pojmański
- The All Sky Automated Survey. Variable Stars in the 0h - 6h Quarter of the Southern Hemisphere by G.Pojmański
- Vertical Structure of Accretion Discs with Hot Coronae in AGN by A. Rożańska, B. Czerny (N.Copernicus Astronomical Center Poland), P.T. Zycki (University of Durham England), G. Pojmański (Astronomical Observatory of Warsaw University Poland)
- The All Sky Automated Survey. The Catalog of the Short Period Variable Stars in the Selected Fields by G. Pojmański
- The All Sky Automated Survey by G. Pojmanski

== See also ==
- OGLE
- Andrzej Udalski
