= Włodzimierz Zonn =

Polish astronomer

Wlodzimierz Zonn (14 July 1905, Vilnius – 28 February 1975) was a Polish astronomer. He studied at the University of Stefan Batory at Wilno, where he later worked as a professor.

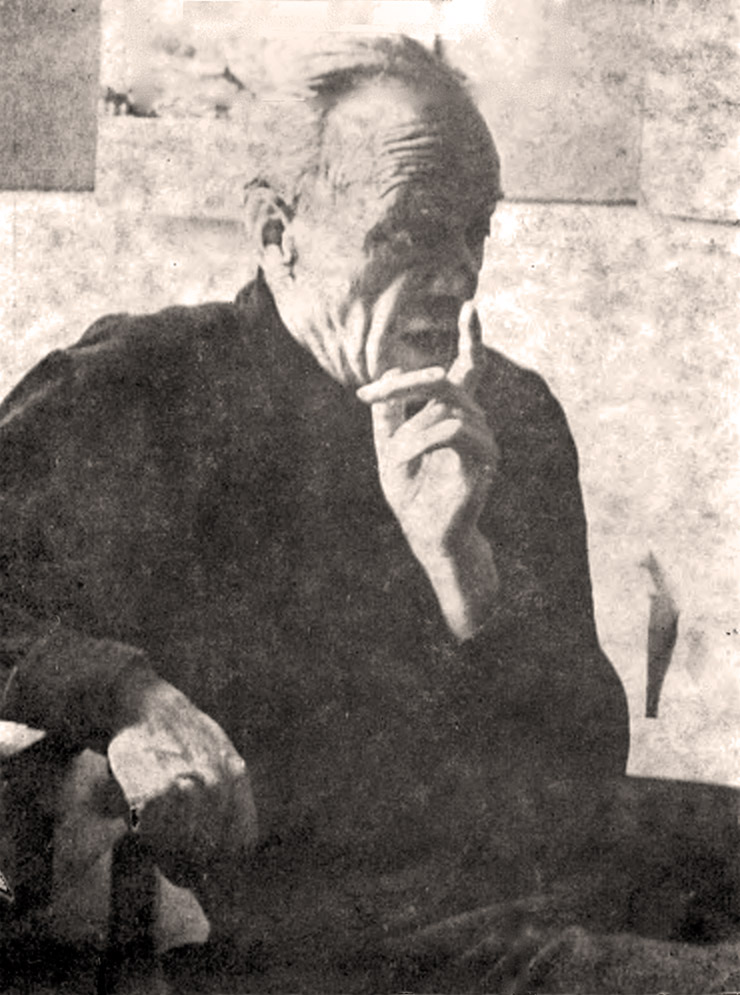
Włodzimierz Zonn.

From 1950, Zonn was director of Astronomical Observatory of the University of Warsaw. For many years (1952 - 1955 and 1963 - 1973), he was President of the Polish Astronomical Society.

== Awards and recognition ==
In 1954 he was awarded with Knight's Cross of the Order of Polonia Restituta.

Since 1983 the Polish Astronomical Society introduced the Włodzimierz Zonn award and medal for popular-science outreach activities.
