= Paczyński–Wiita potential =

Approximation of black hole gravitational potential

The Paczyński–Wiita potential is an approximation of the gravitational potential around a non-rotating black hole. It was introduced by Bohdan Paczyński and Paul Wiita in 1980. The article is one of the 40 most-cited from the first 40 years of the journal Astronomy & Astrophysics. The mathematical form of the potential is

$$\Phi_{PW} (r)=-\frac{GM}{r-r_S}$$

where $r$ is the radial distance from the black hole, $G$ is the gravitational constant, $M$ is the mass of the black hole, and $r_S=2GM/c^2$ is its Schwarzschild radius. ($c$ is the speed of light.) The potential exactly reproduces the locations of the innermost stable circular orbit and the marginally bound orbit. It also exactly reproduces the form of the angular momentum distribution and accurately approximates the Keplerian angular velocity and epicyclic frequency. Because the Paczyński–Wiita potential reproduces these general relativistic effects and is easy to calculate, it is widely used in analytical studies and numerical simulations of black hole accretion.
