= Robert J. Nemiroff =

Professor of Physics

Robert J. Nemiroff is an astrophysicist and a professor of physics at Michigan Technological University. He received his Ph.D. from the University of Pennsylvania in Astronomy and Astrophysics in 1987 and his B.S. from Lehigh University in Engineering Physics in 1982. He is an active researcher with interests that include gamma-ray bursts, gravitational lensing, and cosmology, and is the co-founder and co-editor of Astronomy Picture of the Day (APOD), the home page of which receives over a million hits a day, approximately 20% of nasa.gov traffic. He is married and has one daughter.

== Research ==
Nemiroff's research interests include gamma-ray bursts, gravitational lensing, sky monitoring, and cosmology. Among other findings, his research on gamma-ray bursts:

- showed (along with others) that gamma-ray bursts are consistent with a cosmological distance scale origin before they were discovered to be so distant
- led a team that, along with others, showed a lack of energy-dependence in the speed of photons from distant gamma-ray bursts which implies, in contrast to some theories of quantum gravity, that the universe is smooth below the Planck-length scale, as Einstein had predicted

In 1999 Nemiroff and colleague Bruce Rafert published a paper showing that continuous astronomical sky monitors could soon become a reality. With students, Nemiroff's initial night sky monitor was an automatically repeating SLR camera with a fisheye lens deployed to Michigan Technological University in 1999, Nemiroff then led a group that designed, built, and deployed the first astronomical all sky optical web monitor, dubbed a CONtinuous CAMera (CONCAM), and in 2000 deployed it to Kitt Peak National Observatory. By the mid-2000s, most major astronomical observatories deployed CONCAM or CONCAM-like devices together capable of monitoring most of the night sky most of the time. Astronomical all sky web monitors are now common at astronomical observing sites. Subsequent collaborative efforts in astronomical deep-sky monitoring now include Pan-STARRs and LSST.

In 1986, he predicted the likelihood of microlensing and calculated basic microlensing induced light curves for several possible lens-source configurations in his 1987 thesis. Among his microlensing findings, he, along with others:

- predicted before observational recovery that microlensing light curves can effectively resolve the surface of source stars
- showed that microlensing boosts the brightnesses of stars actually below the magnitude limit of a survey over the survey limit

Nemiroff and graduate student Bijunath R. Patla showed that the Sun is a "very interesting gravitational lens," and Nemiroff found that GRB pulses start at the same time at every energy and that they are scale invariant over energy.

His complete publication list is available from ADS.

== Astronomy Picture of the Day (APOD) ==
Nemiroff is one of two creators and editors of the Astronomy Picture of the Day (APOD) website. Started in 1995 by Nemiroff and Dr. Jerry T. Bonnell, APOD is consistently among the most popular astronomy sites. Its home page typically receives over one million hits per day; APOD has served over one billion images since its start. It is translated into more than 20 languages and has social media outlets on Facebook, Google+, Twitter, and various apps.

Nemiroff and Bonnell were awarded the 2015 Klumpke-Roberts Award by the Astronomical Society of the Pacific "for outstanding contributions to public understanding and appreciation of astronomy" for their work on APOD.

== Astrophysics Source Code Library (ASCL) ==
Nemiroff and John Wallin established the Astrophysics Source Code Library (ASCL), an online registry of scientist-written software used in astronomy or astrophysics research, in 1999. The ASCL improves the transparency of astrophysics research by making the software used in research discoverable for examination.

== Books ==
- The Universe: 365 Days, 2003
- Astronomy: 365 Days, 2006
- Faster than Light: How Your Shadow Can Do It but You Can't, 2023

== Recognition and awards ==
He was named a Fellow of the American Physical Society in 2022 "for exceptional daily astronomy outreach for over 25 years, primarily through the Astronomy Picture of the Day (APOD) website, which has served billions of space-related images with explanations translated daily into over 20 languages". In 2023, an asteroid formerly known as 2002 GB185 was named "(270558) Nemiroff" in recognition of his role in APOD.

Nemiroff and Bonnell were awarded the inaugural International Astronomical Union (IAU) Astronomy Outreach Prize in 2022.

- NSF CAREER Award (1997)
- MTU Research Award (2012)
- MTU University Professor (2021)
