= Astronomy Picture of the Day =

NASA and MTU website

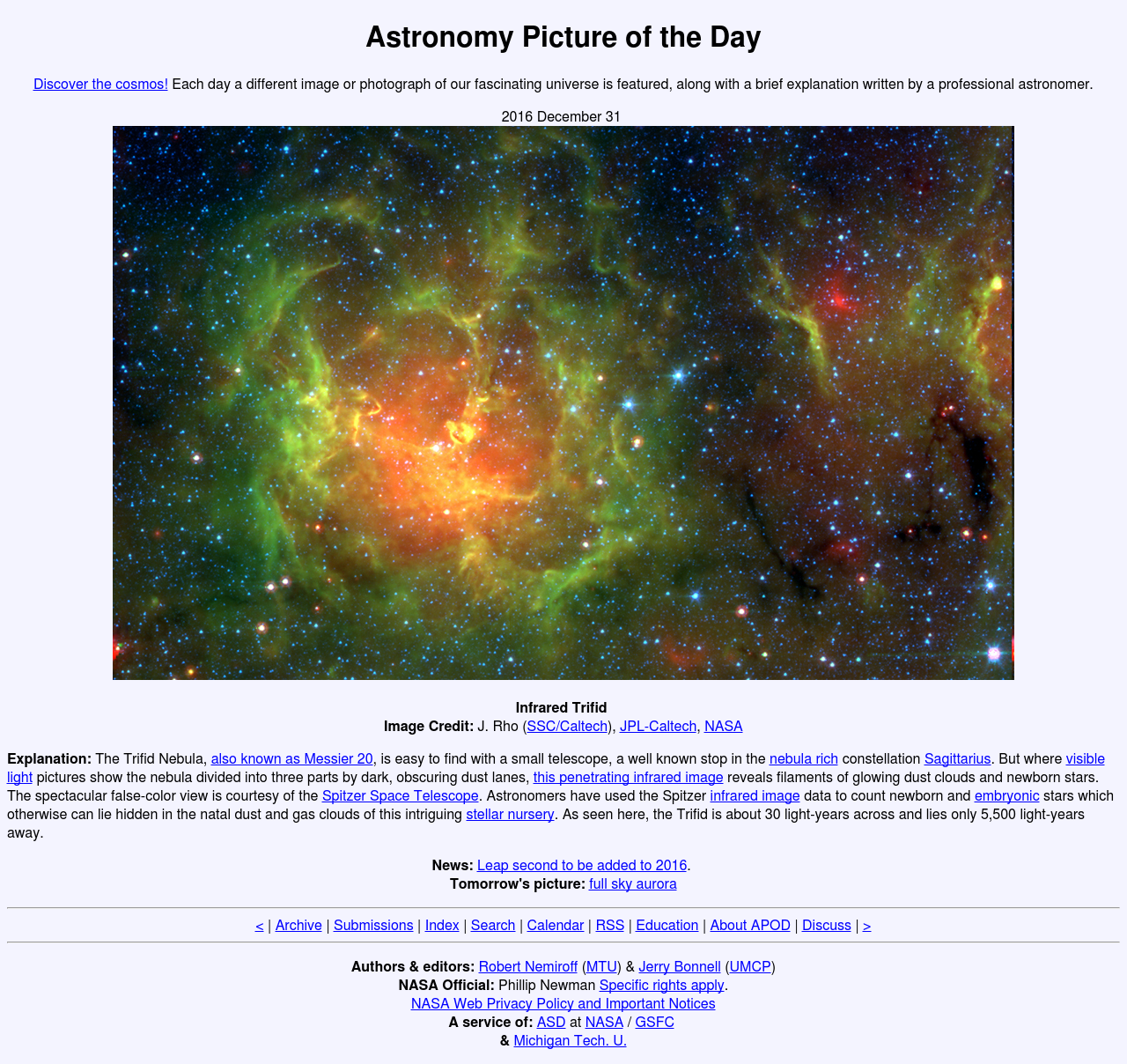
- The APOD website on 31 December 2016, displaying that day's astronomy picture of Trifid Nebula in infrared
- Website type: Photography website
- Available in: English (primary)
- Owners: NASA and MTU
- Creators: Robert J. Nemiroff and Jerry Bonnell
- Website: science.nasa.gov/apod apod.com/en (old interface)
- Commercial: No
- Launched: June 16, 1995; 31 years ago
- Current status: Active

Astronomy Picture of the Day (APOD) is a website provided by NASA and Michigan Technological University (MTU). Each day it features a different image of the universe accompanied by an explanation written by a professional astronomer. The photograph does not necessarily correspond to a celestial event on the exact day that it is displayed, and images are sometimes repeated. These often relate to current events in astronomy and space exploration. The text has several hyperlinks to more pictures and websites for more information. The images are either visible spectrum photographs, images taken at non-visible wavelengths and displayed in false color, video footage, animations, artist's conceptions, or micrographs that relate to space or cosmology.

Past images are stored in the APOD Archive, with the first image appearing on June 16, 1995. This initiative has received support from NASA, the National Science Foundation, and MTU. The images are sometimes authored by people or organizations outside NASA, and therefore APOD images are often copyrighted, unlike many other NASA image galleries.

When the APOD website was created, it received a total of 14 page views on its first day. As of 2012, the APOD website had received over a billion image views. APOD is also translated into 21 languages daily.

APOD was presented at a meeting of the American Astronomical Society in 1996. Its practice of using hypertext was analyzed in a paper in 2000. It received a Scientific American Sci/Tech Web Award in 2001. In 2002, the website was featured in an interview with Nemiroff on CNN Saturday Morning News. In 2003, the two authors published a book titled The Universe: 365 Days from Harry N. Abrams, which is a collection of the best images from APOD as a hardcover "coffee table" style book. APOD was the Featured Collection in the November 2004 issue of D-Lib Magazine.

During the United States federal government shutdown of 2013, APOD continued its service on mirror sites.

Robert J. Nemiroff and Jerry T. Bonnell were awarded the 2015 Klumpke-Roberts Award by the Astronomical Society of the Pacific "for outstanding contributions to public understanding and appreciation of astronomy" for their work on APOD. The site was awarded the International Astronomical Union's 2022 Astronomy Outreach Prize.

As a result of the 2025 United States federal government shutdown, on October 1, 2025, the APOD website began displaying a prominent notice stating: “Due to the lapse in federal government funding, NASA is not updating this website. We sincerely regret this inconvenience.” On November 13, 2025, the notice was removed, APOD resumed regular operation, and entries appeared in the APOD Archive for all missed days.

== Pictures ==
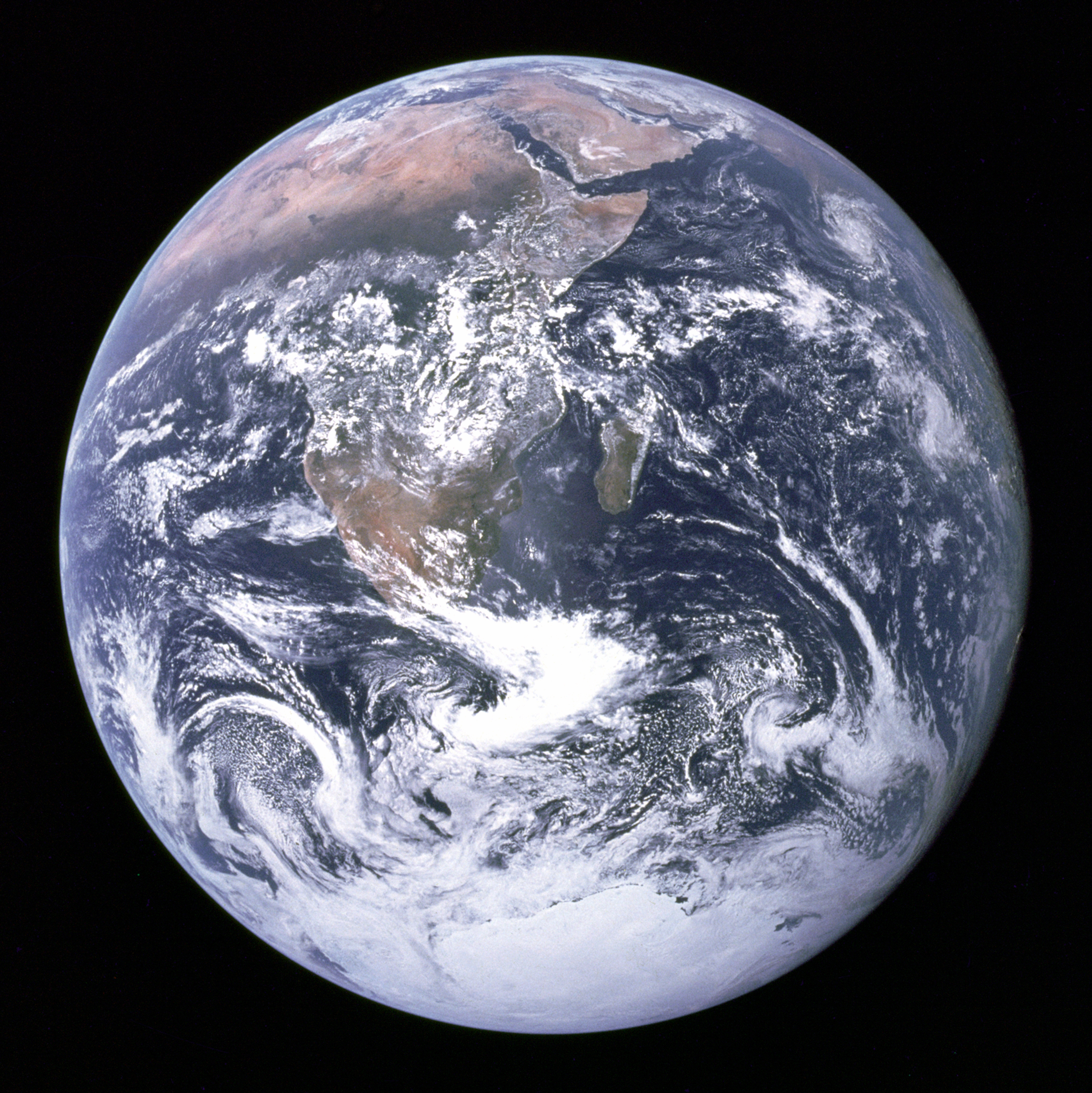
The Blue Marble (March 25, 2007; July 13, 2010; February 6, 2022)

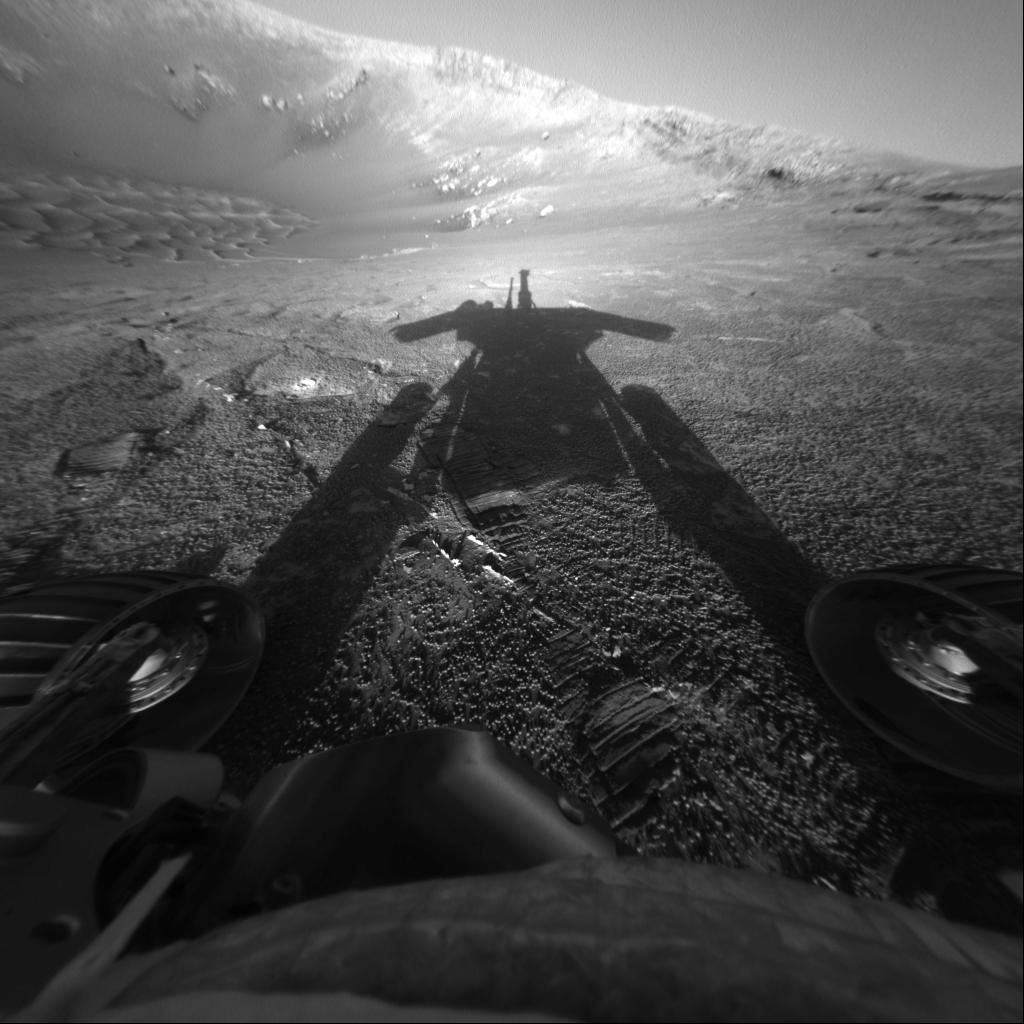
Shadow of a Martian Robot (August 3, 2004; February 4, 2007; June 29, 2008; May 8, 2011; March 29, 2015; February 17, 2019)

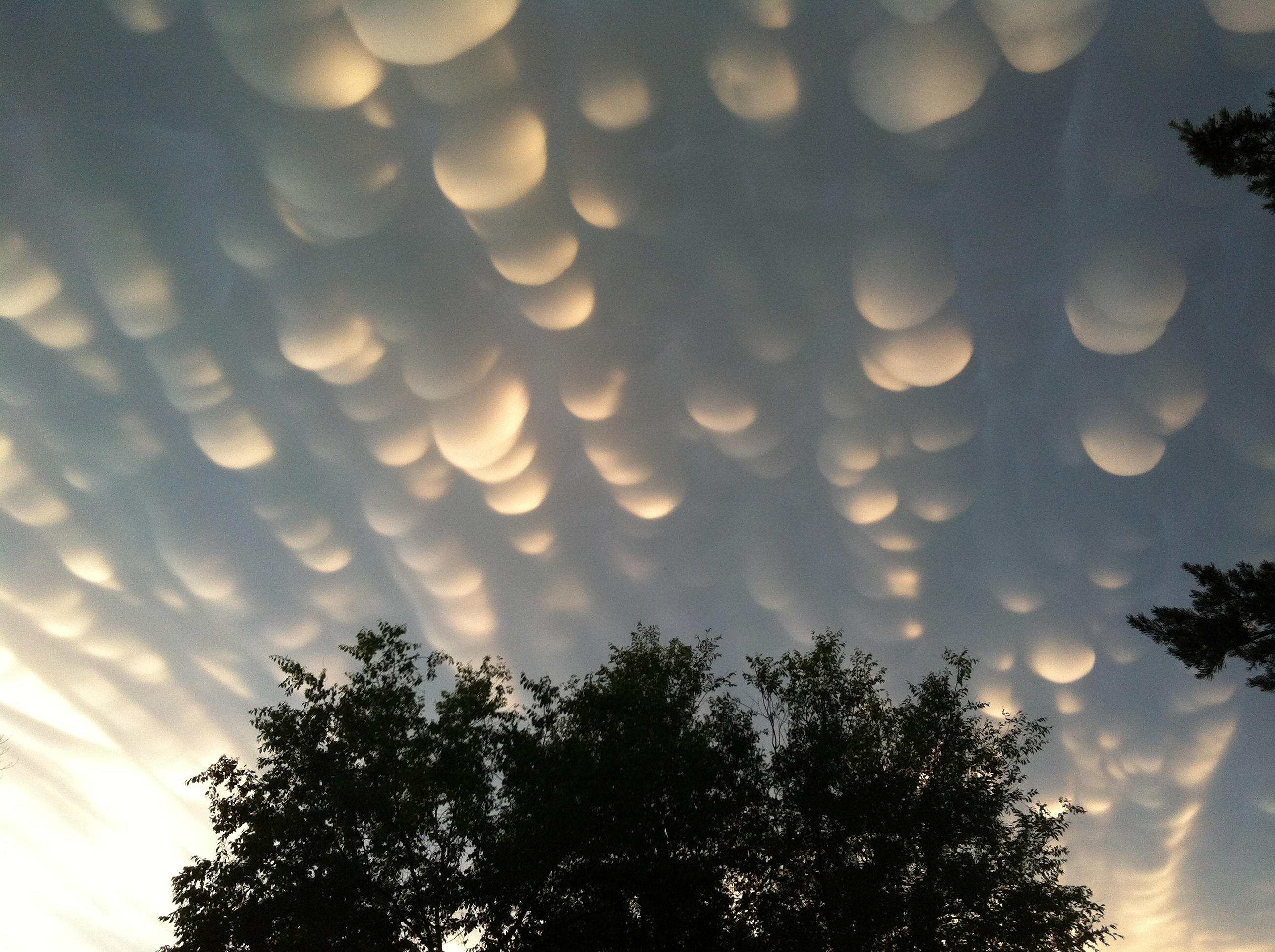
Mammatus Clouds over Saskatchewan (October 23, 2012; October 18, 2015)

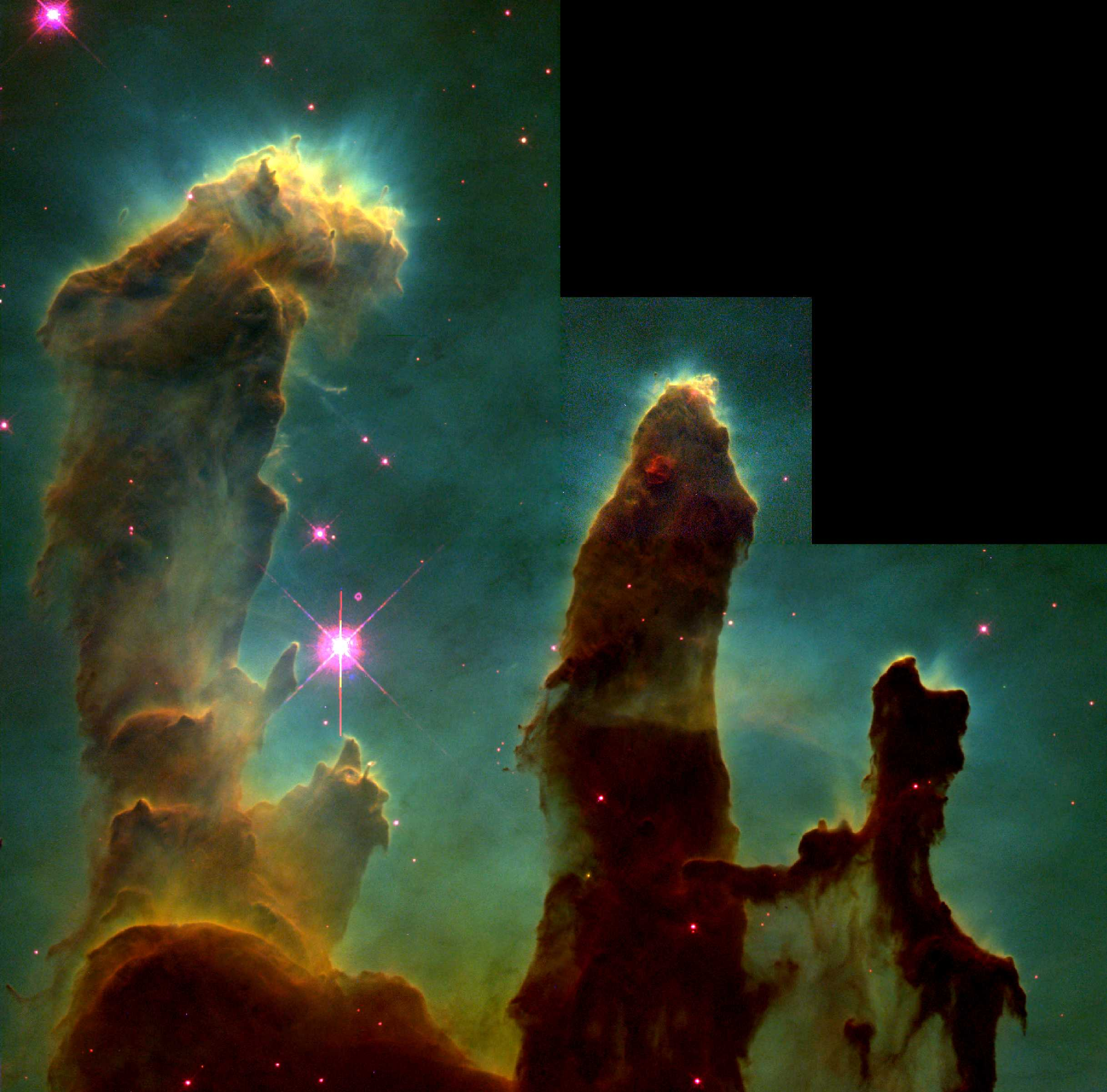
M16: Pillars of Creation (November 6, 1995; January 19, 1997; April 12, 1998; May 2, 1999; September 24, 2000; November 25, 2001; October 26, 2003; April 24, 2005; February 18, 2007; March 28, 2010; July 22, 2012; April 24, 2016; December 6, 2020)

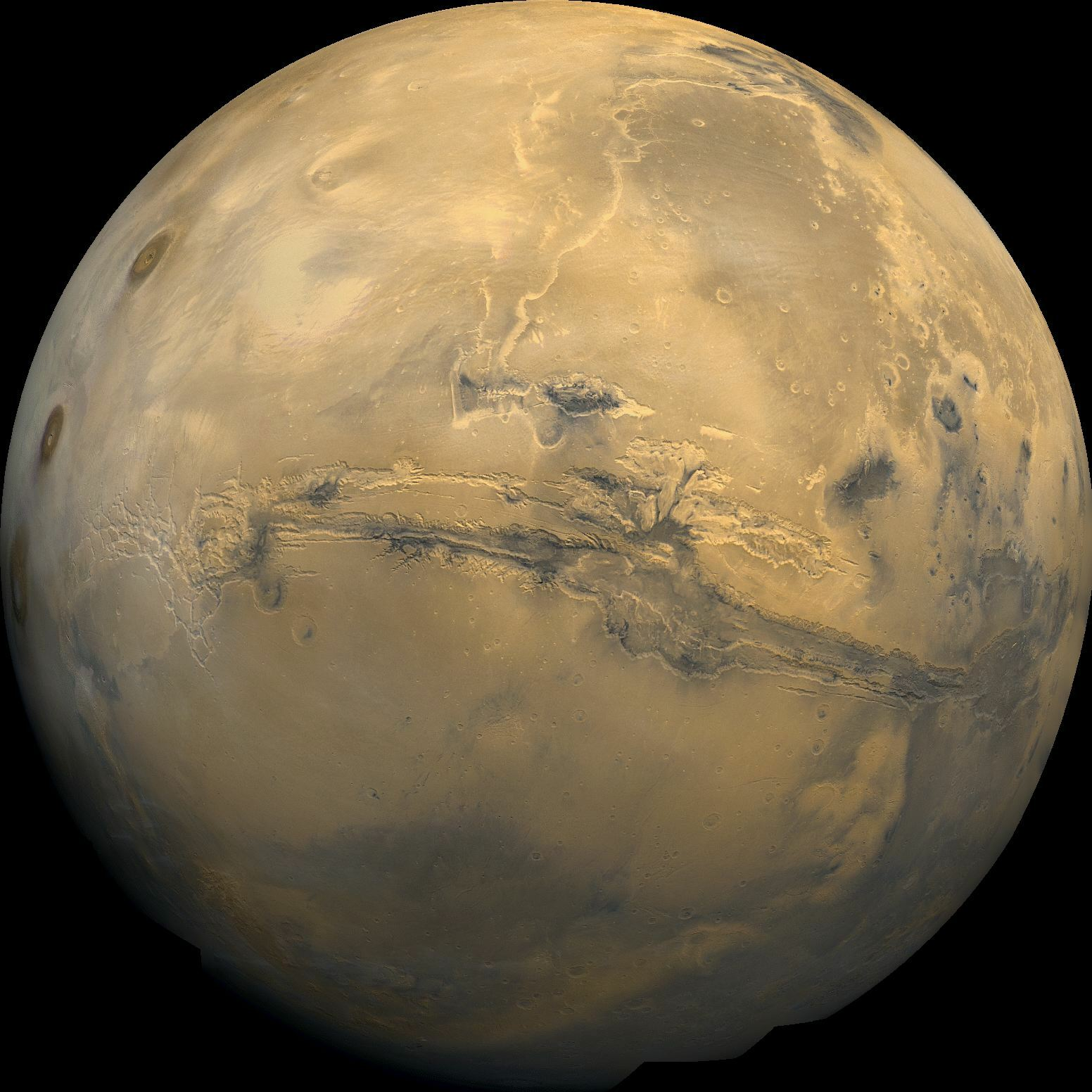
Valles Marineris: The Grand Canyon of Mars (July 16, 1995; July 20, 1995; June 27, 1997; August 27, 2002; August 24, 2003; July 30, 2006; March 27, 2011; May 11, 2014; May 29, 2016; May 24, 2020; November 10, 2024)

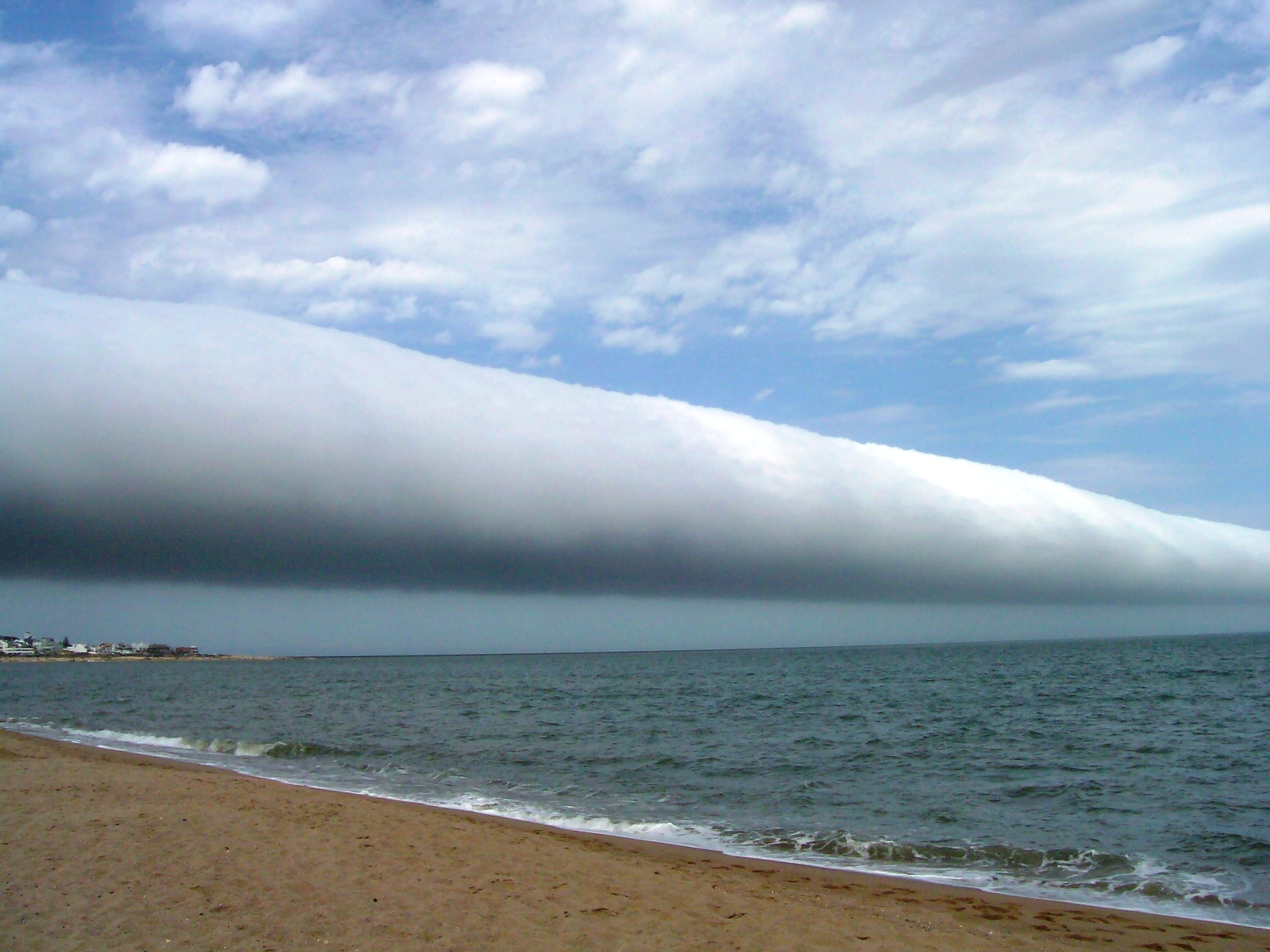
A Roll Cloud over Uruguay (January 5, 2010; June 2, 2013; June 12, 2016)

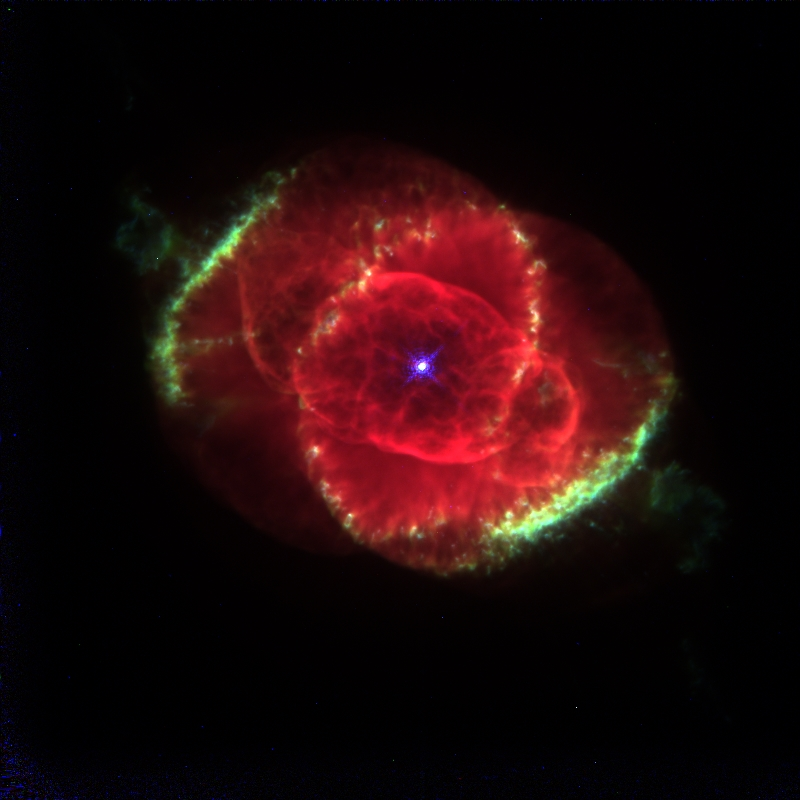
The Cat's Eye Nebula (June 28, 1995; July 4, 1996; August 2, 1997; November 1, 1998; October 31, 1999; March 24, 2002; November 12, 2006; December 27, 2009; August 26, 2012; July 3, 2016)

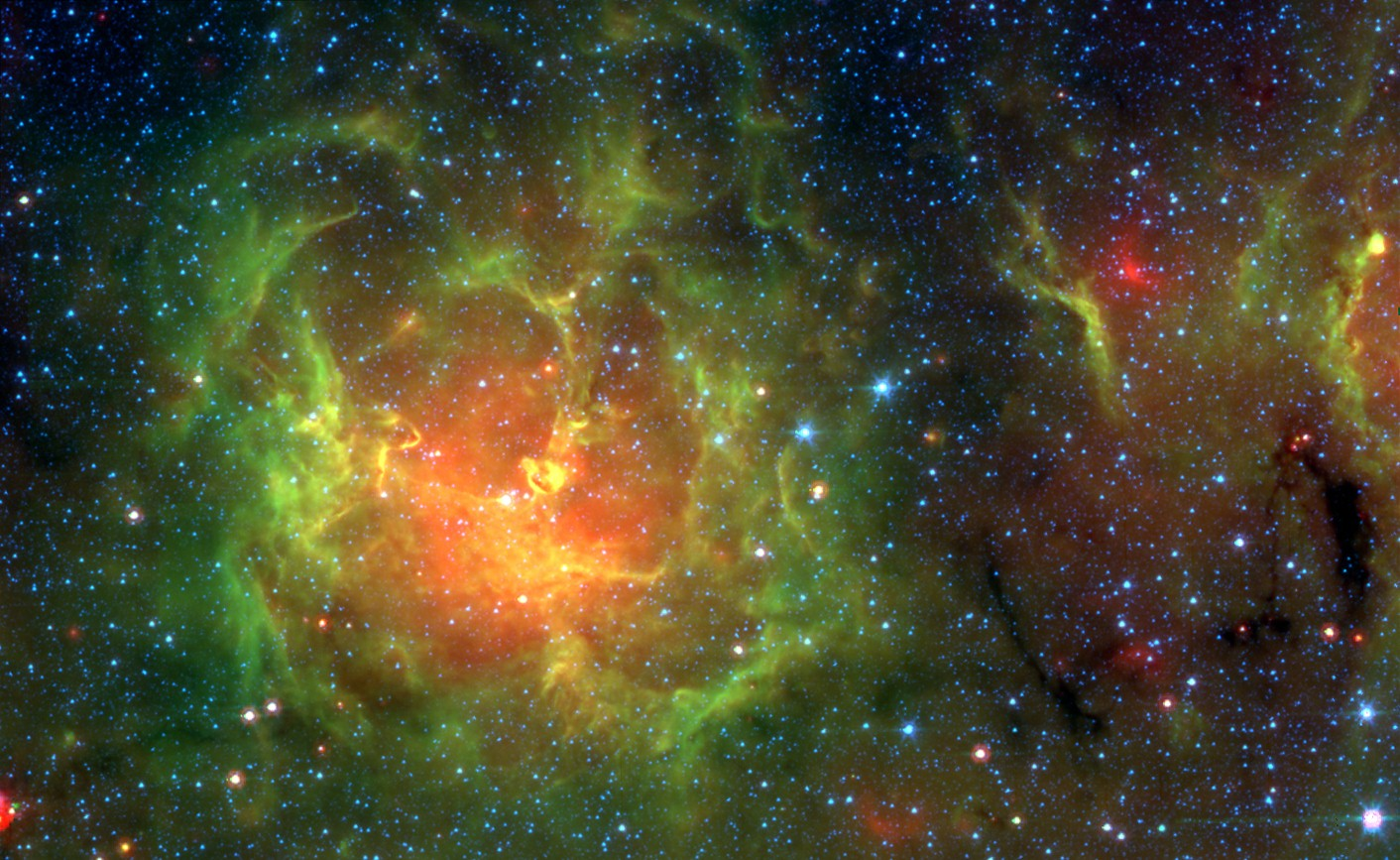
Spitzer's Trifid (January 13, 2005; July 7, 2007; July 25, 2015; December 31, 2016; February 13, 2020)

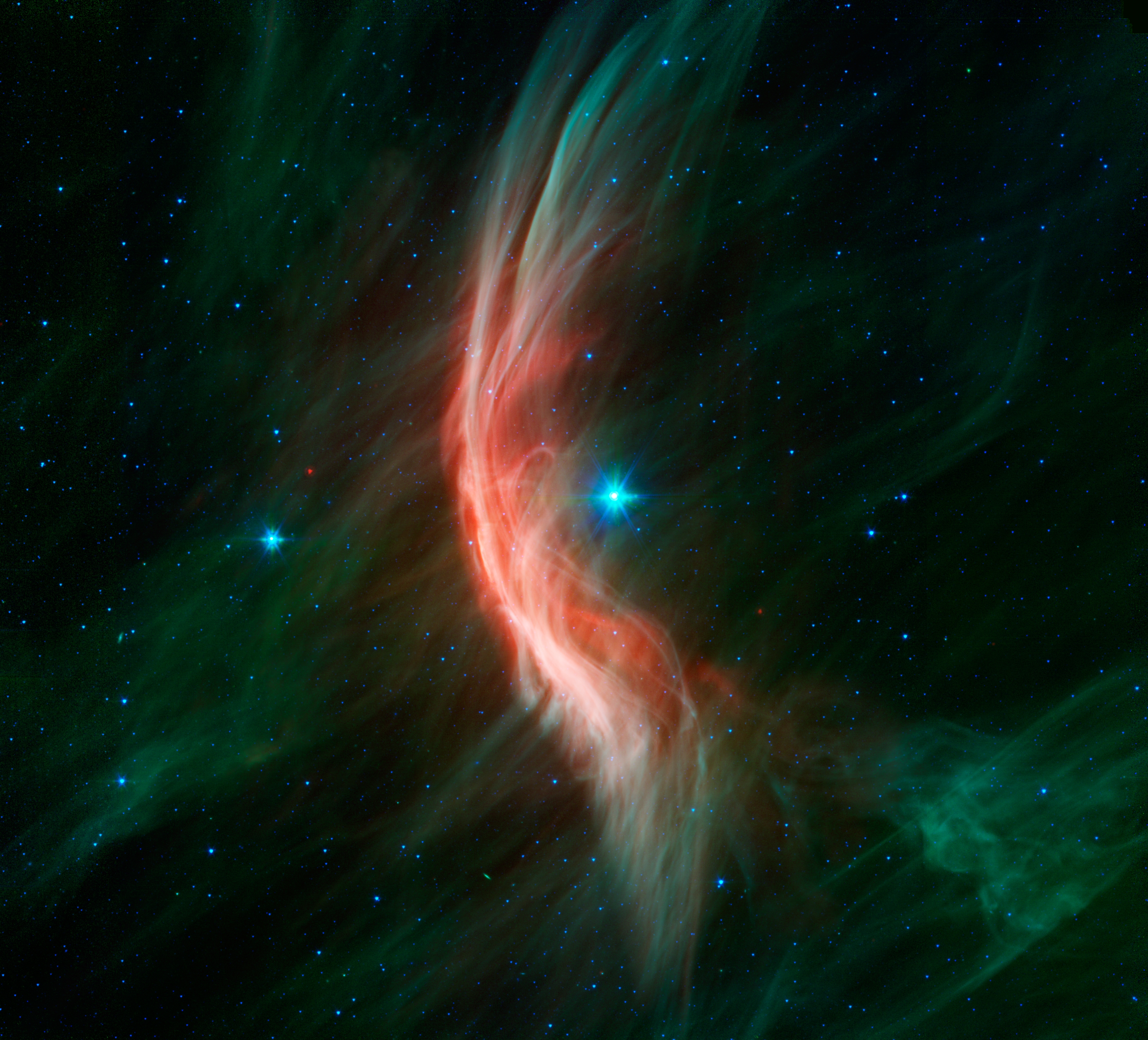
Zeta Oph: Runaway Star (December 29, 2012; July 5, 2015; April 8, 2017; February 2, 2020; January 4, 2024)

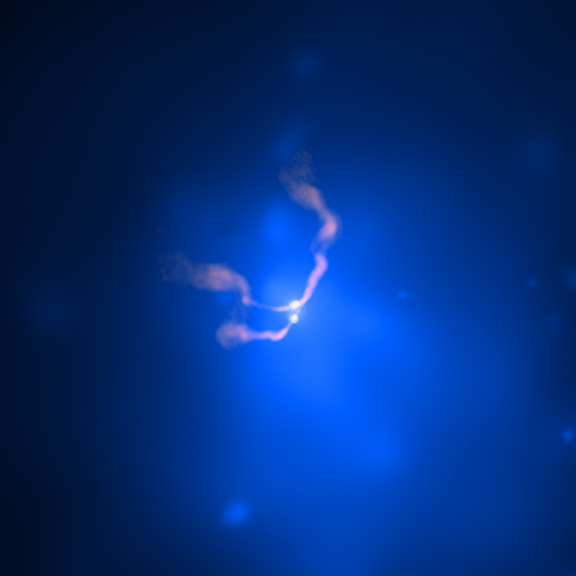
Two Black Holes Dancing in 3C 75 (April 12, 2006; November 9, 2008; March 14, 2010; September 28, 2014; October 22, 2017; June 5, 2022)

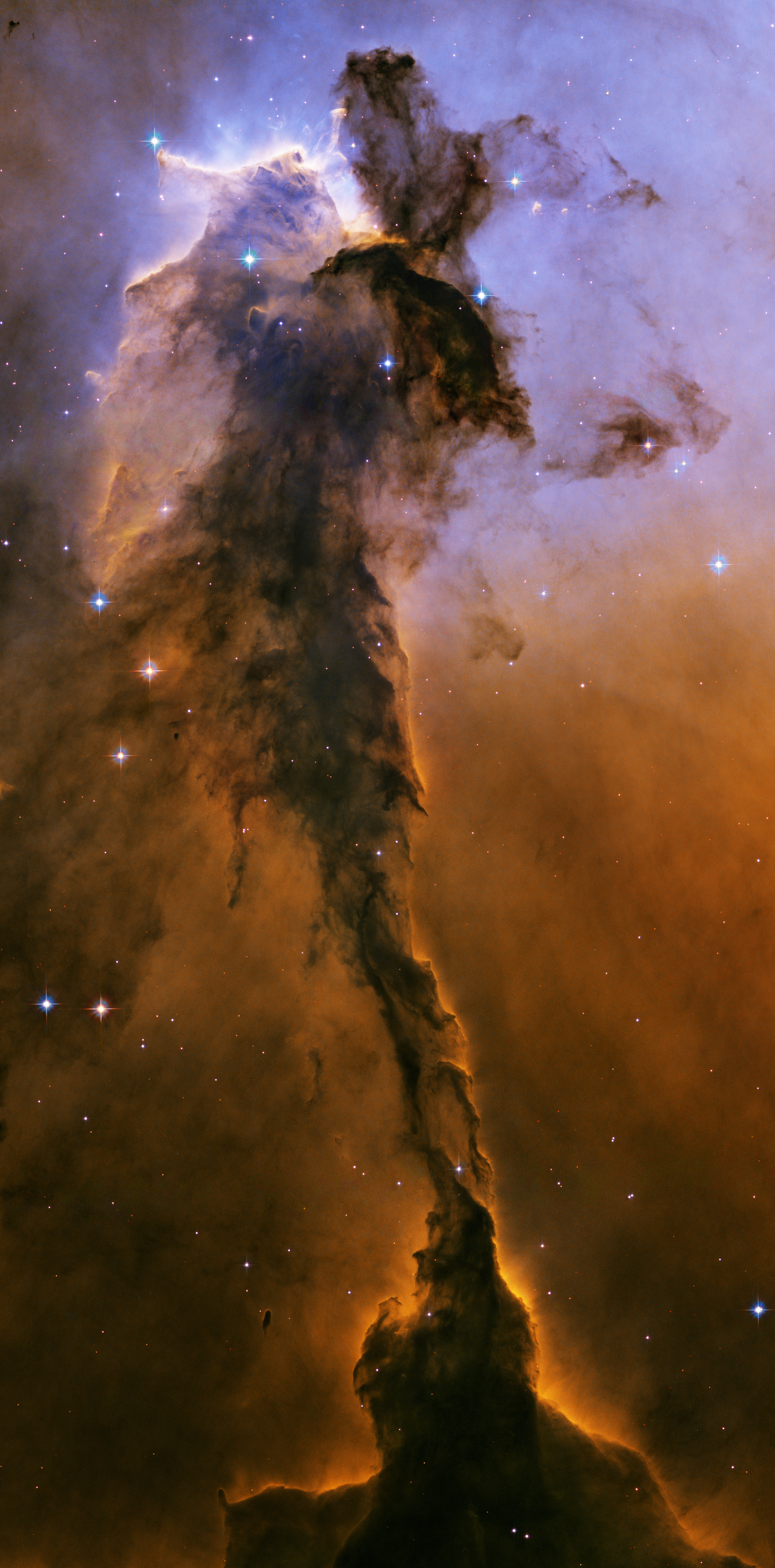
The Fairy of Eagle Nebula (April 25, 2005; December 9, 2007; August 21, 2011; September 29, 2013; December 2, 2018; September 25, 2022)

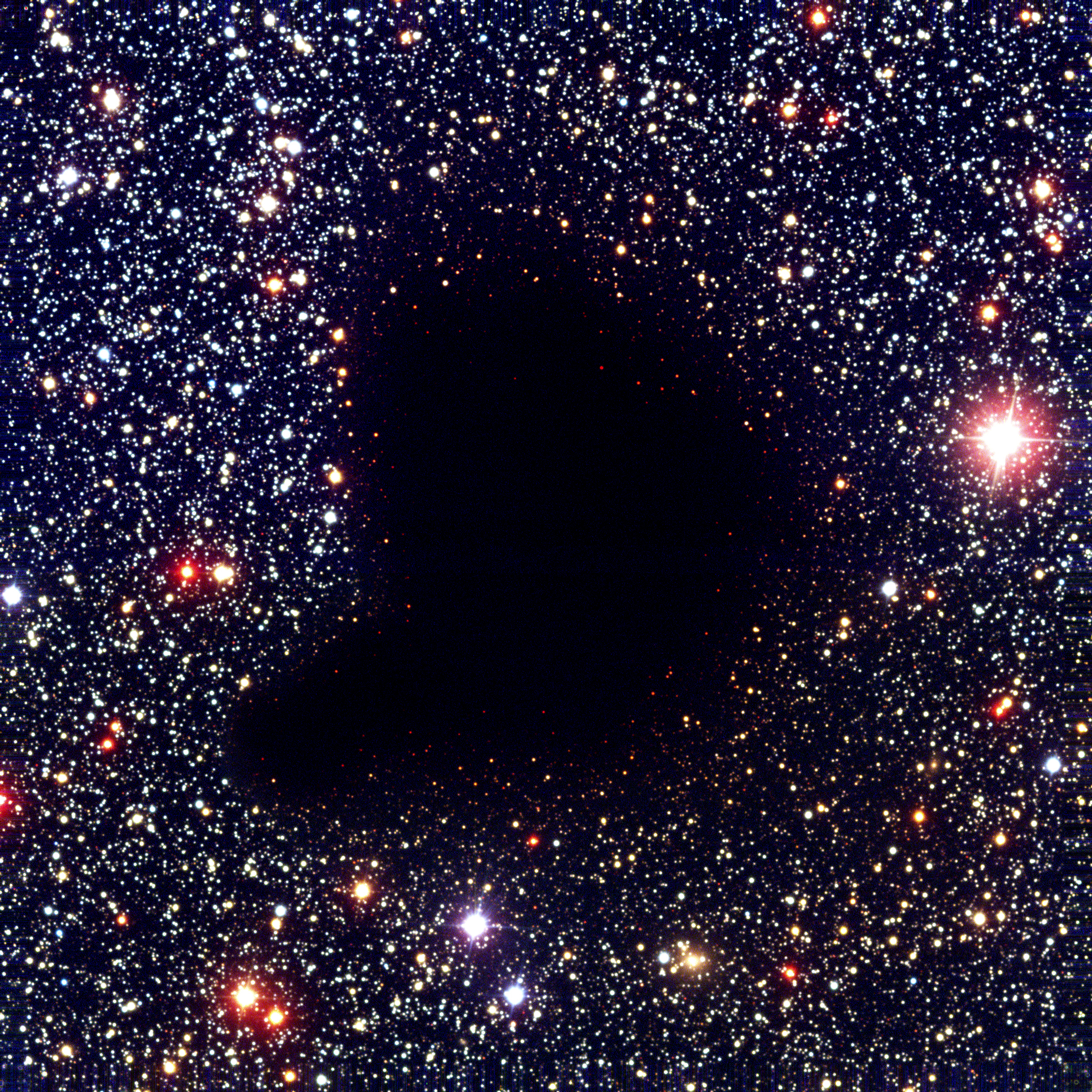
Barnard 68: Dark Molecular Cloud (June 23, 2009; January 29, 2012; December 14, 2014; October 8, 2017; November 22, 2020; January 29, 2023)
