= List of exoplanets detected by microlensing =

This is a list of exoplanets detected by gravitational microlensing. The phenomenon results in the background star's light being warped around a foreground object, causing a distorted image. If the foreground object is a star with an orbiting planet, we would observe an abnormally bright image. By comparing the luminosity and light distortion of the background star to theoretical models, we can estimate the planet's mass and the distance from its star.

The least massive planet detected by microlensing is KMT-2020-BLG-0414Lb, which has a mass about 0.960 times the mass of earth, or OGLE-2016-BLG-0007Lb, which has a mass about 1.32 times the mass of earth. The widest separation between a planet and a star is OGLE-2008-BLG-092Lb, which is 15 AU; the shortest separation is KMT-2020-BLG-0414Lc, which is 0.12 AU. There are 9 known multi-planetary systems detected by microlensing, all of which have two planets.

== List ==
Yellow rows denote the members of multi-planet systems. Green rows denote the members of multi-star systems.

Planet	Mass (M_{J})	Projected separation (AU)	Period (d)	Eccentricity	Inclination (°)	Year of discovery
OGLE-2003-BLG-235Lb	2.6	5.1				2004
OGLE-2005-BLG-071Lb	3.5	3.6	~ 3600			2005
OGLE-2005-BLG-390Lb	0.017	2.1	3500			2005
OGLE-2005-BLG-169Lb	0.04	2.8	3300			2006
OGLE-2006-BLG-109Lb	0.727	2.3	1790		64	2008
OGLE-2006-BLG-109Lc	0.271	4.5	4931	0.15	64	2008
MOA-2007-BLG-192Lb	0.01	0.66				2008
MOA-2007-BLG-400Lb	0.9	0.85				2008
MOA-2008-BLG-310Lb	0.23	1.25				2009
OGLE-2007-BLG-368Lb	0.0694	3.3				2009
MOA-2009-BLG-319Lb	0.157	2.0				2010
MOA-2009-BLG-387Lb	2.6	1.8	1970			2011
MOA-2009-BLG-266Lb	0.0327	3.2	2780			2011
MOA-2011-BLG-293Lb	2.4	1.0				2012
MOA-bin-1Lb	3.7	8.3				2012
MOA-2010-BLG-477Lb	1.5	2±1				2012
OGLE-2012-BLG-0026Lb	0.11	3.82	~3000			2012
OGLE-2012-BLG-0026Lc	0.68	4.63	~4000			2012
MOA-2010-BLG-073Lb	11	1.21				2012
OGLE-2011-BLG-0251Lb	0.53±0.21	2.72±0.75 or 1.5±0.5				2013
OGLE-2012-BLG-0406Lb	2.73±0.43	3.45±0.26				2013
OGLE-2012-BLG-0358Lb	1.9±0.2	0.87				2013
MOA-2010-BLG-328Lb	0.03 ± 0.0075	0.92				2013
MOA-2011-BLG-322Lb	11.6	4.3				2013
MOA-2008-BLG-379Lb	5±2.5	4±1.6				2013
MOA-2011-BLG-262Lb (Note: The nature of the observed system is unclear. It is either a rogue planet with about 3.2 M_{J} masses and a 0.5 M_{🜨} exomoon or a red dwarf with 18 M_{🜨} planet.)	~0.053 or ~0.0015	~0.95 or ~0.13				2013
MOA-2013-BLG-220Lb	2.74	3.03				2014
OGLE-2008-BLG-355Lb	4.6	1.7				2014
OGLE-2013-BLG-0341LBb	0.00522	0.702				2014
OGLE-2013-BLG-0102Lb	13.6	0.8				2014
OGLE-2008-BLG-092Lb	0.137	15				2014
OGLE-2014-BLG-0124Lb	0.51±0.16	3.1±0.5	~2400			2014
OGLE-2011-BLG-0265Lb	1.0 ± 0.3	2				2014
OGLE-2012-BLG-0563Lb	0.39	0.74				2015
OGLE-2015-BLG-0966Lb	0.066	2.7				2015
MOA-2010-BLG-353Lb	0.27	1.72				2015
MOA-2013-BLG-605Lb	0.0102	0.93				2015
MOA-2011-BLG-028Lb	0.09	4.14				2015
OGLE-2015-BLG-0954Lb	3.4	1.6				2016
OGLE-2014-BLG-1760Lb	0.56	1.75				2016
OGLE-2012-BLG-0724Lb	0.47	1.6				2016
OGLE-2015-BLG-0051Lb	0.72	0.73				2016
OGLE-2012-BLG-0950Lb	0.079	2.2				2016
OGLE-2007-BLG-349L(AB)b	0.25	2.59	2557			2016
OGLE-2014-BLG-0676Lb	3.68	4.53				2016
OGLE-2016-BLG-1195Lb	0.0312	2.62				2017
MOA-2012-BLG-505Lb	0.0211	0.9				2017
MOA-2012-BLG-006Lb	8.4	10.2				2017
MOA-2016-BLG-227Lb	2.8	1.39				2017
OGLE-2013-BLG-0132Lb	0.29	3.6				2017
OGLE-2013-BLG-1721Lb	0.64	2.6				2017
OGLE-2016-BLG-0263Lb	4.1	5.4				2017
OGLE-2016-BLG-0613L(AB)b	4.18	6.4				2017
OGLE-2016-BLG-1190Lb	13.38	2.17	1220	0.42	41.2	2017
UKIRT-2017-BLG-001Lb	1.28	4.18				2018
TCP J05074264+2447555b	0.0629	0.940				2018
OGLE-2017-BLG-1522Lb	0.75	0.59				2018
OGLE-2017-BLG-1434Lb	0.014±0.0016	1.18±0.1				2018
OGLE-2017-BLG-1140Lb	1.59	1.02				2018
OGLE-2017-BLG-0482Lb	0.028	1.8				2018
OGLE-2017-BLG-0373Lb	0.401	2.424				2018
OGLE-2017-BLG-0173Lb	0.01029	3.913				2018
OGLE-2014-BLG-1722Lb	0.174	1.5				2018
OGLE-2014-BLG-1722Lc	0.263	1.7				2018
OGLE-2013-BLG-1761Lb	2.7	1.8				2018
OGLE-2011-BLG-0173Lb	0.19	8				2018
MOA-2016-BLG-319Lb	0.62	0.95				2018
MOA-2015-BLG-337Lb	0.106	0.24				2018
MOA-2011-BLG-291Lb	0.057	0.69				2018
MOA-2010-BLG-117Lb	0.54	2.42				2018
KMT-2017-BLG-0165Lb	0.11	3.45				2018
KMT-2016-BLG-2142Lb	15.49	0.83				2018
KMT-2016-BLG-1820Lb	4.57	1.08				2018
KMT-2016-BLG-1397Lb	7.0	5.1				2018
KMT-2016-BLG-0212Lb	18	2.2				2018
OGLE-2018-BLG-1011Lb	1.8	1.8				2019
OGLE-2018-BLG-1011Lc	2.8	0.8				2019
OGLE-2018-BLG-0740Lb	4.8	5.0	5480	0		2019
OGLE-2018-BLG-0596Lb	0.04383	0.97				2019
OGLE-2016-BLG-1067Lb	0.43	1.70				2019
OGLE-2015-BLG-1670Lb	0.0563	2.62				2019
OGLE-2015-BLG-1649Lb	2.54	2.07				2019
OGLE-2013-BLG-0911Lb	9.51	0.39				2019
MOA-bin-29Lb	0.6	0.48				2019
KMT-2018-BLG-1990Lb	0.605	1.083				2019
KMT-2017-BLG-1146Lb	0.71	1.6				2019
KMT-2017-BLG-1038Lb	2.0	1.8				2019
KMT-2016-BLG-1836Lb	2.2	3.5				2019
KMT-2016-BLG-1107Lb	3.283	0.342				2019
OGLE-2018-BLG-1700Lb	4.40	2.8				2020
OGLE-2018-BLG-1269Lb	0.67	4.51				2020
OGLE-2018-BLG-0677Lb	0.0125	0.63				2020
OGLE-2018-BLG-0532Lb	0.01960	1.064				2020
OGLE-2017-BLG-1375Lb	11.28	3.04				2020
OGLE-2017-BLG-1049Lb	5.53	3.92				2020
OGLE-2017-BLG-0604Lb	0.51	4.06				2020
OGLE-2017-BLG-0406Lb	0.41	3.5				2020
OGLE-2016-BLG-1227Lb	0.79	3.4				2020
OGLE-2015-BLG-1771Lb	0.433	0.85				2020
OGLE-2012-BLG-0838Lb	0.167	4.43				2020
OGLE-2006-BLG-284LAb	0.453	2.17				2020
KMT-2019-BLG-1953Lb	0.64					2020
KMT-2019-BLG-1339Lb	1.25	2.15				2020
KMT-2019-BLG-0842Lb	0.03234	3.31				2020
KMT-2018-BLG-1292Lb	4.42	6.03				2020
KMT-2018-BLG-0748Lb	0.19	0.62				2020
KMT-2018-BLG-0029Lb	0.0239	4.27				2020
KMT-2016-BLG-2397Lb	2.63	3.64				2020
KMT-2016-BLG-2364Lb	3.93	2.63				2020
OGLE-2019-BLG-1053Lb	0.00780	3.4				2021
OGLE-2019-BLG-0960Lb	0.0079	1.90				2021
OGLE-2019-BLG-0954Lb	14.2	2.65				2021
OGLE-2019-BLG-0304Lb	0.510	1.23				2021
OGLE-2019-BLG-0299Lb	6.220	2.80				2021
OGLE-2017-BLG-1099Lb	3.02	2.73				2021
OGLE-2018-BLG-1428Lb	0.77	3.30				2021
OGLE-2018-BLG-1185Lb	0.0264	1.54				2021
OGLE-2018-BLG-0962Lb	1.34	3.59				2021
OGLE-2018-BLG-0567Lb	0.32	2.72				2021
KMT-2017-BLG-2509Lb	2.09	2.14				2021
KMT-2018-BLG-1976Lb	2.22	3.54				2021
KMT-2018-BLG-1996Lb	1.09	4.27				2021
KMT-2021-BLG-0322Lb	6.40					2021
KMT-2020-BLG-0414Lb	0.00302	1.26				2021
KMT-2020-BLG-0414Lc	27	0.12				2021
KMT-2019-BLG-1715Lb	2.56	3.32				2021
KMT-2019-BLG-0371Lb	7.7	0.79				2021
KMT-2018-BLG-1743Lb	0.245	1.449				2021
KMT-2018-BLG-1025Lb	0.019064	1.305				2021
KMT-2016-BLG-2605Lb	0.7710	0.681				2021
OGLE-2019-BLG-1470L(AB)c	2.2	3.2				2022
OGLE-2019-BLG-1492Lb	0.117	2.7				2022
OGLE-2018-BLG-0977Lb	0.0201	2.0				2022
OGLE-2018-BLG-0516Lb	0.0632	2.2				2022
OGLE-2018-BLG-0506Lb	0.0513	3.0				2022
OGLE-2019-BLG-0468Lb	3.43	3.29				2022
OGLE-2019-BLG-0468Lc	10.22	2.77				2022
OGLE-2019-BLG-0362Lb	3.26	2.18				2022
OGLE-2018-BLG-1647Lb	0.970	1.36				2022
OGLE-2018-BLG-1367Lb	0.950	1.21				2022
OGLE-2018-BLG-1126Lb	0.056	3.23				2022
OGLE-2018-BLG-1119Lb	0.910	4.06				2022
OGLE-2018-BLG-0298Lb	0.14	2.86				2022
OGLE-2018-BLG-0383Lb	0.0201	1.8				2022
OGLE-2017-BLG-1691Lb	0.046	2.41				2022
OGLE-2018-BLG-0799Lb	0.26	1.28				2022
OGLE-2018-BLG-0932Lb	0.890	1.75				2022
OGLE-2018-BLG-1212Lb	0.20	1.68				2022
OGLE-2016-BLG-1093Lb	0.71	2.13				2022
OGLE-2014-BLG-0319Lb	0.57	3.49				2022
MOA-2020-BLG-135Lb	0.0356	1.11				2022
MOA-2019-BLG-008Lb	18					2022
KMT-2019-BLG-0253Lb	0.0488	1.1				2022
KMT-2021-BLG-2294Lb	0.070	1.15				2022
KMT-2021-BLG-1898Lb	0.730	1.9				2022
KMT-2021-BLG-1689Lb	0.14	2.5				2022
KMT-2021-BLG-0119Lb	5.52	2.92				2022
KMT-2021-BLG-0192Lb	0.11	1.62				2022
KMT-2021-BLG-0171Lb	0.0352	3.5				2022
KMT-2021-BLG-1303Lb	0.38	2.89				2022
KMT-2021-BLG-0320Lb	0.10	1.54				2022
KMT-2021-BLG-1554Lb	0.12	0.72				2022
KMT-2021-BLG-1391Lb	0.0143	2.29				2022
KMT-2021-BLG-1372Lb	0.1928	2.37				2022
KMT-2021-BLG-1253Lb	0.05994	1.52				2022
KMT-2019-BLG-0953Lb	0.0289	3.1				2022
KMT-2021-BLG-0748Lb	0.45	2.43				2022
KMT-2021-BLG-1077Lb	0.22	1.26				2022
KMT-2021-BLG-1077Lc	0.25	0.930				2022
KMT-2021-BLG-0912Lb	0.00884	3.14				2022
KMT-2021-BLG-0240Lb	0.21	2.8				2022
KMT-2021-BLG-2974Lb	0.28	2.0				2022
KMT-2019-BLG-1552Lb	4.05	2.6				2022
KMT-2019-BLG-1042Lb	0.19	1.7				2022
KMT-2018-BLG-1988Lb	0.0175	3.09				2022
KMT-2019-BLG-0414Lb	4.57	1.16				2022
KMT-2017-BLG-0673Lb	3.67	2.34				2022
KMT-2018-BLG-0087Lb	0.23	0.870				2022
KMT-2018-BLG-0030Lb	1.45	4.39				2022
KMT-2018-BLG-0247Lb	2.11	2.46				2022
KMT-2018-BLG-2602Lb	1.15	3.81				2022
OGLE-2019-BLG-1180Lb	1.747	5.19				2023
OGLE-2019-BLG-0679Lb	3.34	6.99				2023
OGLE-2019-BLG-0249Lb	7.12	1.84				2023
OGLE-2017-BLG-1806Lb	0.0166	1.75				2023
MOA-2022-BLG-249Lb	0.0152	1.63				2023
MOA-2020-BLG-208Lb	0.14	2.74				2023
KMT-2022-BLG-1013Lb	0.31	1.38				2023
KMT-2022-BLG-0440Lb	0.0485	1.9				2023
KMT-2022-BLG-0371Lb	0.26	3.02				2023
KMT-2021-BLG-2478Lb	0.900	1.85				2023
KMT-2021-BLG-2010Lb	1.07	1.79				2023
KMT-2021-BLG-1770Lb	21	0.900				2023
KMT-2021-BLG-1547Lb	1.47	4.5				2023
KMT-2021-BLG-1150Lb	0.880	4.5				2023
KMT-2021-BLG-1105Lb	1.30	3.54				2023
KMT-2021-BLG-0909Lb	1.26	1.75				2023
KMT-2021-BLG-0712Lb	0.1202	2.22				2023
KMT-2019-BLG-2783Lb	1.16	1.85				2023
KMT-2019-BLG-1806Lb	0.0147	3.02				2023
KMT-2019-BLG-1367Lb	0.0128	1.70				2023
KMT-2019-BLG-1216Lb	0.0940	2.44				2023
KMT-2019-BLG-0335Lb	21	1.64				2023
KMT-2019-BLG-0298Lb	1.81	5.67				2023
KMT-2019-BLG-0297Lb	19	0.960				2023
KMT-2018-BLG-0885Lb	29	1.07				2023
KMT-2017-BLG-1194Lb	0.0111	1.78				2023
KMT-2017-BLG-1003Lb	0.01633	1.38				2023
KMT-2017-BLG-0428Lb	0.0176	1.81				2023
KMT-2016-BLG-1105Lb	0.00730	2.44				2023
K2-2016-BLG-0005Lb	1.10	4.16	4700			2023
OGLE-2017-BLG-1275Lb	5.90	2.09				2024
OGLE-2017-BLG-1237Lb	3.80	2.53				2024
OGLE-2017-BLG-0640Lb	1.62	1.14				2024
OGLE-2017-BLG-0448L b	0.0491^{+0.0434}_{−0.0293}	5.75^{+2.39}_{−2.00}				2024
OGLE-2016-BLG-1800L b	2.59±1.46	1.88±0.51				2024
OGLE-2016-BLG-1598L b	0.38±0.30	2.50±0.88				2024
OGLE-2014-BLG-0221L b	4.35^{+1.65}_{−1.91}	3.76^{+0.96}_{−1.07}				2024
MOA-2022-BLG-563L b	0.40^{+0.31}_{−0.25}	2.15^{+0.37}_{−0.52}				2024
MOA-2016-BLG-526L b	0.047±0.021	2.07±0.35				2024
KMT-2024-BLG-1044L b	0.02438^{+0.03785}_{−0.01271}					2024
KMT-2023-BLG-1866L b	0.00827^{+0.00132}_{−0.00214}	2.63^{+0.37}_{−0.34}				2024
KMT-2023-BLG-1743L b	20^{+30}_{−10}	1.16^{+0.17}_{−0.21}				2024
KMT-2023-BLG-1642L b	1.08^{+1.53}_{−0.58}	1.41^{+0.22}_{−0.27}				2024
KMT-2023-BLG-1454L b	0.630^{+0.710}_{−0.340}	1.18^{+0.17}_{−0.18}				2024
KMT-2023-BLG-1431L b	0.0428^{+0.0261}_{−0.0217}	3.2^{+0.7}_{−0.8}				2024
KMT-2023-BLG-0735L b	0.122±0.068	2.96^{+0.56}_{−0.74}				2024
KMT-2023-BLG-0469L b	0.124^{+0.092}_{−0.067}	2.31^{+0.34}_{−0.39}				2024
KMT-2023-BLG-0416L b	0.041^{+0.020}_{−0.021}	2.96^{+0.54}_{−0.75}				2024
KMT-2022-BLG-2286L b	19^{+27}_{−10}	2.02^{+0.27}_{−0.31}				2024
KMT-2022-BLG-0303L b	0.513^{+0.410}_{−0.275}	4.81^{+0.65}_{−0.76}				2024
KMT-2021-BLG-2609L b	0.032^{+0.044}_{−0.018}	2.30^{+0.32}_{−0.36}				2024
KMT-2016-BLG-2321L b	0.950±0.410	3.58±0.81				2024
Gaia22dkvL b	0.591^{+0.152}_{−0.052}	1.40^{+0.77}_{−0.34}				2024
OGLE-2016-BLG-0007L b	0.00415^{+0.00286}_{−0.00211}	10.1^{+3.8}_{−3.4}	14200^{+7700}_{−3300}			2025
KMT-2021-BLG-0736L b	0.066^{+0.041}_{−0.031}	4.0^{+0.9}_{−0.8}				2025
KMT-2019-BLG-0578L b	1.2^{+1.2}_{−0.6}	2.0±0.3				2025
AT2021ueyL b	1.34^{+0.45}_{−0.50}	4.01^{+1.68}_{−1.34}	4168.69^{+2910.76}_{−1713.98}			2025
KMT-2017-BLG-2197L b	8.840^{+8.290}_{−4.910}	15.91^{+2.08}_{−2.68}				2025
KMT-2022-BLG-1790L b	1.73^{+0.95}_{−0.89}	5.25^{+0.75}_{−1.04}				2025
KMT-2023-BLG-0119L b	0.26335^{+0.16820}_{−0.14395}	3.14^{+1.32}_{−1.33}				2025
KMT-2022-BLG-2076L b	0.880^{+0.460}_{−0.450}	5.67^{+1.28}_{−1.58}				2025
KMT-2023-BLG-0548L b	3.42^{+1.21}_{−0.89}	6.85^{+1.22}_{−1.10}				2025
KMT-2023-BLG-0830L b	0.056^{+0.064}_{−0.033}	1.70^{+0.27}_{−0.29}				2025
KMT-2023-BLG-0949L b	5.980^{+4.360}_{−3.110}	2.03^{+0.66}_{−0.81}				2025
KMT-2023-BLG-1896L b	0.05144^{+0.03087}_{−0.02656}	2.86^{+1.12}_{−1.02}				2025
KMT-2023-BLG-2209L b	0.800±0.380	3.51^{+0.095}_{−1.12}				2025
KMT-2024-BLG-0404L b	27.24^{+39.81}_{−13.62}	0.85±0.11				2025
KMT-2024-BLG-0404L c	0.0544^{+0.0802}_{−0.0277}					2025
KMT-2024-BLG-1005L b	21^{+22}_{−12}	0.78^{+0.12}_{−0.11}				2025
KMT-2024-BLG-1209L b	2.64^{+1.57}_{−1.16}	2.51^{+1.50}_{−1.10}				2025
KMT-2024-BLG-1281L b	0.0600^{+0.0660}_{−0.0360}	1.96^{+0.30}_{−0.38}				2025
KMT-2024-BLG-2059L b	0.022^{+0.012}_{−0.013}	2.55^{+0.56}_{−0.89}				2025
KMT-2024-BLG-2242L b	0.044^{+0.076}_{−0.024}	0.890±0.120				2025
MOA-2022-BLG-033L b	0.03823^{+0.02961}_{−0.01966}	2.15^{+1.17}_{−0.75}				2025
MOA-2022-BLG-091L b	3.59^{+2.00}_{−1.67}	3.44^{+1.92}_{−1.60}				2025
OGLE-2015-BLG-1609L b	0.240^{+0.900}_{−0.170}					2025
OGLE-2016-BLG-0007L b	0.00415^{+0.00286}_{−0.00211}	10.1^{+3.8}_{−3.4}	14200^{+7700}_{−3300}			2025
KMT-2022-BLG-1818L b	4.00^{+1.24}_{−2.00}	2.6±0.9				2026
KMT-2022-BLG-1818L c	0.36^{+0.30}_{−0.21}	12.6^{+6.0}_{−4.7}				2026
OGLE-2013-BLG-1125L b	0.33±0.0408926	≥1				2026

=== Candidate rogue planets ===
A number of candidate rogue planets have been detected by microlensing.

Planet	Mass	Year of discovery
MOA-2011-BLG-274L	0.8±0.3 M_{J}	2014
OGLE-2016-BLG-1540L	~35 M_{🜨}	2017
OGLE-2012-BLG-1323L	~2.3 M_{🜨}	2018
OGLE-2017-BLG-0560L	~1.9 M_{J}	2018
OGLE-2019-BLG-0551L	~7.7 M_{🜨}	2020
KMT-2019-BLG-2073L	~59 M_{🜨}	2020
OGLE-2016-BLG-1928L	~0.3 M_{🜨}	2020
KMT-2017-BLG-2820L	~8.2 M_{🜨}	2020

=== Unconfirmed detections ===
Some microlensing events, such as MACHO-98-BLG-35 and PA-99-N2, suggest the possible presence of a planetary companion to the lensing star, but this is unconfirmed. Since microlensing relies on a one-time chance alignment, it is likely not possible to confirm these detections.

In some cases, a planetary interpretation for a microlensing event was proposed, but has been disproven. MACHO-1997-BLG-41 was initially interpreted as a binary star system orbited by a circumbinary planet, but a different model with two stars and no planet was later found to be a better fit to the data. Similarly, OGLE-2013-BLG-0723L was initially interpreted as a binary system of a star and a brown dwarf, with a low-mass planet orbiting the brown dwarf, but a model where the system consists of two low-mass stars with no planet was found to be a better fit to the data.

== See also ==
- Lists of exoplanets
- Method of exoplanet detection using microlensing
