= MOA-2008-BLG-310L =

Star

Observation data Epoch J2000.0 Equinox J2000.0
- Constellation: Scorpius
- Right ascension: 17^{h} 54^{m} 14.53^{s}
- Declination: −34° 46′ 41.0″
- Apparent magnitude (V): 23.38

Characteristics
- Spectral type: G?V

Astrometry
Distance	>20000 ly (>6000 pc)

Details
Mass	0.67 M_{☉}

Database references
SIMBAD	data
Exoplanet Archive	data

MOA-2008-BLG-310L is a 23rd magnitude star located at least 20000 light years away in the constellation Scorpius. This star has mass 0.67 solar masses which imply that it could probably be a late K-type star.

== Planetary system ==
In 2009 during a microlensing event, a planet was found orbiting this star at a distance of 1.25 AU and has mass 0.23 times that of Jupiter.

The MOA-2008-BLG-310L system
Companion	Mass	Observed separation (AU)
b	0.23 ± 0.05 M_{J}	1.25 ± 0.1

== See also ==
- MOA-2007-BLG-192L
- OGLE-2005-BLG-390L
- List of extrasolar planets
