= MOA-2010-BLG-477L =

Star in the constellation Sagittarius

Observation data Epoch J2000 Equinox J2000
- Constellation: Sagittiarus
- Right ascension: 18^{h} 06^{m} 7.44^{s}
- Declination: −31° 24′ 16.12″

Characteristics
- Evolutionary stage: white dwarf
- Variable type: Planetary microlensing

Astrometry
Distance	7500 ± 2000 ly (2300 ± 600 pc)

Details
Mass	0.53±0.11 M_{☉}

Other designations
- MOA 2010-BLG-477, MOA 2010-BLG-477L, MOA-2010-BLG-477 L

Database references
SIMBAD	The star
- planet b

MOA-2010-BLG-477L is a star which was discovered when it caused a microlensing event in August 2010. The microlensing event also revealed the existence of a planet orbiting the star. At first the star was thought to be about 0.67 times the mass of the Sun, in the main-sequence phase of its stellar evolution. But by the time the star should have been separated enough in the sky from the source star of the microlensing event it was not detected, implying that it is actually a dim white dwarf star.

== Planetary system ==
The MOA-2010-BLG-477L planetary system
Companion (in order from star)	Mass	Semimajor axis (AU)	Orbital period (days)	Eccentricity	Inclination	Radius
b	1.5 ^{+1.8}_{−0.3} M_{J}	2 ^{+3}_{−1}	—	—	—	—

The planet, MOA-2010-BLG-477Lb, was first observed in 2010. In that year, a microlensing event occurred, where gravitational lensing as the planet and its host star pass in front of a background star causes a temporary flare in the amount of light observed, allowing the planet's existence to be known. before the planet was confirmed conclusively, and was detected independently by the MOA and OGLE collaborations. Following the original microlensing event, astronomers predicted another microlensing peak, which was observed by numerous groups using a wide array of telescopes. One of these telescopes was located in Antarctica, and made the first microlensing detections from that continent; however, the data collected there were too crude to be included in the analysis which eventually confirmed the planet. Little is known about this planet, with the only characteristics known about this system are the mass of the planet and its projected separation from its host star.

Observations from the Keck Observatory in Hawaii allowed a team from Australia and New Zealand to study the system in more detail. They determined that the star was a white dwarf, and that the planet was similar in mass to Jupiter. The gas giant planet was found to be about 2.8 AU, or about 260 million miles, away from the white dwarf star, which is about half the mass of the Sun. MOA-2010-BLG-477Lb shows a potential scenario for Jupiter's continued orbit around the Sun in the distant future, after the star's own evolution into a white dwarf.

MOA-2010-BLG-477Lb is the only planet which has been detected orbiting MOA-2010-BLG-477L.

== See also ==
- List of exoplanets and planetary debris around white dwarfs
- List of exoplanets detected by microlensing
- KMT-2020-BLG-0414L
