= MOA-2007-BLG-400L =

Star in the constellation Sagittarius

Observation data Epoch J2000.0 Equinox J2000.0
- Constellation: Sagittarius
- Right ascension: 18^{h} 09^{m} 42^{s}
- Declination: –29° 13′ 27″
- Apparent magnitude (V): 22

Characteristics
- Spectral type: M3V?

Astrometry
Distance	22472.1 ly (6890 pc)

Details
Mass	0.35 ± 0.15 M_{☉}

Database references
SIMBAD	data

MOA-2007-BLG-400L is a star located 22472.1 light-years (6890 parsecs) away in the constellation of Sagittarius. This star is presumed to be a red dwarf with a spectral type of M3V, based on its mass of 0.35 M_{☉}.

== Planetary system ==
In September 2008, the discovery of an extrasolar planet was announced by the Microlensing Follow Up Network (μFUN) and the Microlensing Observations in Astrophysics (MOA) Collaboration. This planet was detected by the gravitational microlensing method based on an event recorded in September 2007.

The MOA-2007-BLG-400L system
Companion	Mass	Observed separation (AU)
b	0.9 ± 0.4 M_{J}	0.85 ± 0.25

== See also ==
- List of extrasolar planets
- MOA-2007-BLG-192L
