= MOA-2009-BLG-387L =

Star in the constellation Sagittarius

- Constellation Sagittarius. MOA-2009-BLG-387L is located just to the right of "The Teapot".

Observation data Epoch J2000 Equinox ICRS
- Constellation: Sagittarius
- Right ascension: 17^{h} 53^{m} 51^{s}
- Declination: −33° 59′ 25″
- Apparent magnitude (V): 18.35 (± 0.03)

Characteristics
- Spectral type: M

Astrometry
Distance	5,700 (± 2,200) pc

Details
Mass	0.19 ^{+0.3}_{−0.12} M_{☉}

Database references
SIMBAD	data

MOA-2009-BLG-387L is a red dwarf in the constellation Sagittarius that is host to the planet MOA-2009-BLG-387Lb. The star is estimated to be nearly 20,000 light-years away and approximately one fifth the mass of the Sun, although large confidence intervals exist, reflecting the uncertainties in both the mass and distance. The star drew the attention of astronomers when it became the lens of gravitational microlensing event MOA-2009-BLG-387L, in which it eclipsed a background star and created distorted caustics, an envelope of reflected or refracted light rays. Analysis of the caustic events and of follow-up observational data led to the planet's discovery, which was reported in February 2011.

== Observational history ==
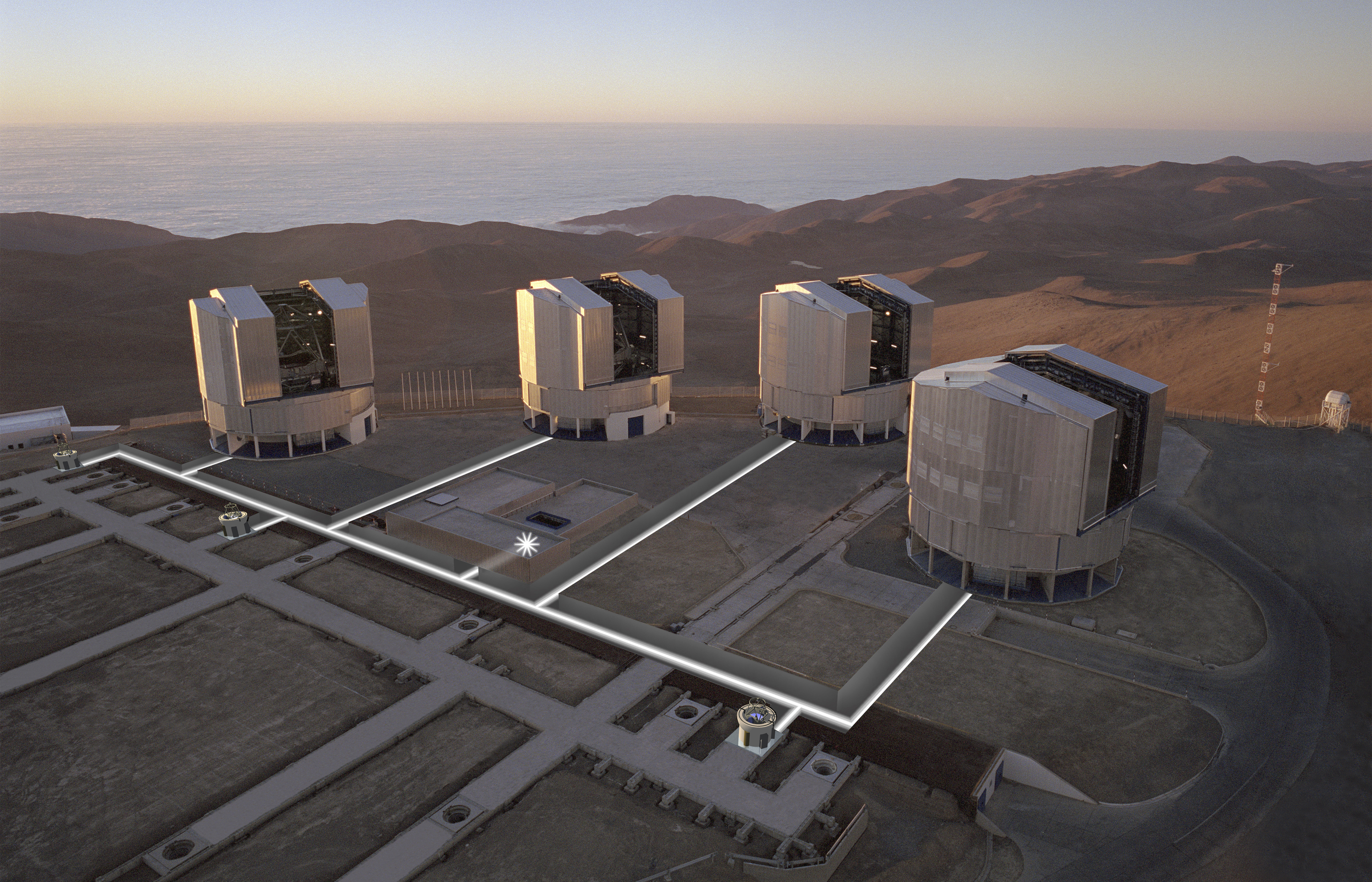
The Very Large Telescope Array, which was used to conduct follow-up observations

On July 24, 2009, the Microlensing Observations in Astrophysics collaboration (MOA) detected the star MOA-2009-BLG-387L eclipsing a background star in a microlensing event that was named MOA-2009-BLG-387. In a process called gravitational microlensing, the star MOA-2009-BLG-387L became a lens that created two distorted caustic images. In the case of the microlensing event MOA-2009-BLG-387, these caustics produced a series of small "resonating" diffractions; such resonant-caustic events are valued because they tend to yield more information about an orbiting planet.

The first caustic event was detected by the South African Astronomical Observatory (SAAO) on July 24, 2009. An alert was issued, which attracted many to cover the caustic event; as such, the end of the first caustic event was well documented. The microlensing event's second caustic event was seven days later, an unusually long middle period for planetary microlensing events. An alert brought three different telescopes at SAAO and telescopes at ten different observatories to focus on the event.

Follow-up observations on the star MOA-2009-BLG-387L using the NACO imager at the Very Large Telescope array successfully distinguished the star's mass. The collected data from VLT and from observations during the microlensing event was run through a series of models and analyzed. An orbiting planetary body larger than Jupiter (or of a similar size, given uncertainties) was discovered. The discovery of the planet was reported on February 21, 2011 in the journal Astronomy and Astrophysics.

== Characteristics ==
MOA-2009-BLG-387L is an M-type red dwarf in the Sagittarius constellation. It is estimated to be 5,700 parsecs (19,000 light-years) away, although uncertainty has led the discovering team to place the confidence intervals at ± 2,200 parsecs (7,200 light-years); in other words, although the distance of MOA-2009-BLG-387L from Earth is best placed at 5700 parsecs, astronomers can only be 90% certain that it is somewhere between 3,500 and 7,900 parsecs away. Likewise, although MOA-2009-BLG-387L's mass has been estimated at 0.19 times that of the Sun, the confidence intervals remain large (^{+0.3}_{−0.12}), as uncertainty in the mass of the planet places its true mass between 0.07 and 0.49 times the mass of the Sun. This covers the entirety of the range of masses known in red dwarfs.

The ratio between planet MOA-2009-BLG-387Lb's mass to that of its host star has been found with accuracy. However, because the host star's characteristics are not as well constrained, the planet's characteristics are not well constrained either. The inability to constrain many of MOA-2009-BLG-387L's characteristics is a consequence of the fact that the star acted as the lens in the microlensing event, which compromised the ability to collect most of the star's stellar parameters.

== Planetary system ==
MOA-2009-BLG-387Lb is the only known exoplanet in the orbit of host star MOA-2009-BLG-387L. The planet is estimated to be 2.6 times the mass of Jupiter. However, because knowledge of the exact parameters of the planet are tied to the host star's parameters, and the host star's parameters are not well constrained, uncertainty places MOA-2009-BLG-387Lb's mass between 1.0 and 6.7 times that of Jupiter. The planet is estimated to orbit its host star every 1,970 days at a distance of 1.8 AU, some 1.8 times the mean distance between Earth and the Sun. Uncertainty broadens the mean distance to between 1.1 and 2.7 AU.

The MOA-2009-BLG-387L planetary system
Companion (in order from star)	Mass	Semimajor axis (AU)	Orbital period (days)	Eccentricity	Inclination (°)	Radius
b	2.6 M_{J}	1.8	1970	?	—	—
