= MOA-2008-BLG-310Lb =

Saturn size exoplanet orbiting MOA-2008-BLG-310L

Discovery
- Discovered by: Janczak et al.
- Discovery site: Paranal Observatory
- Discovery date: August 4, 2009
- Detection method: gravitational microlensing

Orbital characteristics
- Star: MOA-2008-BLG-310L

Physical characteristics
- Mass: 0.23 ± 0.05 M_{J}

MOA-2008-BLG-310Lb is an extrasolar planet which orbits probably the late K-type star MOA-2008-BLG-310L, located at least 20000 light years away in the constellation Scorpius. This planet has mass 23% of Jupiter or 77% of Saturn and orbits at 1.25 AU from the star. This planet was discovered by using the gravitational microlensing method on August 4, 2009. As it is typical for exoplanets detected by microlensing method, the orbital period and eccentricity are not determined.

== See also ==
- MOA-2007-BLG-192Lb
- OGLE-2005-BLG-390Lb
