= Time-domain astronomy =

Study of how astronomical objects change with time

Light curve of NGC 2525 after a supernova

Time-domain astronomy is the study of how astronomical objects change with time. Said to have begun with Galileo's Letters on Sunspots, the field has now naturally expanded to encompass variable objects beyond the Solar System. Temporal variation may originate from movement of the source, or changes in the object itself. Common targets include novae, supernovae, pulsating stars, flare stars, blazars and active galactic nuclei. Optical time domain surveys include OGLE, HAT-South, PanSTARRS, SkyMapper, ASAS, WASP, CRTS, GOTO, and the LSST at the Vera C. Rubin Observatory.

Time-domain astronomy studies transient astronomical events ("transients"), which include various types of variable stars, including periodic, quasi-periodic, high proper motion stars, and lifecycle events (supernovae, kilonovae) or other changes in behavior or type. Non-stellar transients include asteroids, planetary transits and comets.

Transients characterize astronomical objects or phenomena whose duration of presentation may be from milliseconds to days, weeks, or even several years. This is in contrast to the timescale of the millions or billions of years during which the galaxies and their component stars in the universe have evolved. The term is used for violent deep-sky events, such as supernovae, novae, dwarf nova outbursts, gamma-ray bursts, and tidal disruption events, as well as gravitational microlensing.

Time-domain astronomy also involves long-term studies of variable stars and their changes on the timescale of minutes to decades. Variability studied can be intrinsic, including periodic or semi-regular pulsating stars, young stellar objects, stars with outbursts, asteroseismology studies; or extrinsic, which results from eclipses (in binary stars, planetary transits), stellar rotation (in pulsars, spotted stars), or gravitational microlensing events.

Modern time-domain astronomy surveys often uses robotic telescopes, automatic classification of transient events, and rapid notification of interested people. Blink comparators have long been used to detect differences between two photographic plates, and image subtraction became more used when digital photography eased the normalization of pairs of images. Due to large fields of view required, the time-domain work involves storing and transferring a huge amount of data. This includes data mining techniques, classification, and the handling of heterogeneous data.

The importance of time-domain astronomy was recognized in 2018 by German Astronomical Society by awarding a Karl Schwarzschild Medal to Andrzej Udalski for "pioneering contribution to the growth of a new field of astrophysics research, time-domain astronomy, which studies the variability of brightness and other parameters of objects in the universe in different time scales." Also the 2017 Dan David Prize was awarded to the three leading researchers in the field of time-domain astronomy: Neil Gehrels (Swift Gamma-Ray Burst Mission), Shrinivas Kulkarni (Palomar Transient Factory), Andrzej Udalski (Optical Gravitational Lensing Experiment).

== History ==
Before the invention of telescopes, transient events that were visible to the naked eye, from within or near the Milky Way Galaxy, were very rare, and sometimes hundreds of years apart. However, such events were recorded in antiquity, such as the supernova in 1054 observed by Chinese, Japanese and Arab astronomers, and the event in 1572 known as "Tycho's Supernova" after Tycho Brahe, who studied it until it faded after two years. Even though telescopes made it possible to see more distant events, their small fields of view – typically less than 1 square degree – meant that the chances of looking in the right place at the right time were low. Schmidt cameras and other astrographs with wide field were invented in the 20th century, but mostly used to survey the unchanging heavens.

Historically time domain astronomy has come to include appearance of comets and variable brightness of Cepheid-type variable stars. Old astronomical plates exposed from the 1880s through the early 1990s held by the Harvard College Observatory are being digitized by the DASCH project.

The interest in transients has intensified when large CCD detectors started to be available to the astronomical community. As telescopes with larger fields of view and larger detectors come into use in the 1990s, first massive and regular survey observations were initiated - pioneered by the gravitational microlensing surveys such as Optical Gravitational Lensing Experiment and the MACHO Project. These efforts, beside the discovery of the microlensing events itself, resulted in the orders of magnitude more variable stars known to mankind. Subsequent, dedicated sky surveys such as the Palomar Transient Factory, the spacecraft Gaia and the LSST, focused on expanding the coverage of the sky monitoring to fainter objects, more optical filters and better positional and proper motions measurement capabilities. In 2022, the Gravitational-wave Optical Transient Observer (GOTO) began looking for collisions between neutron stars.

The ability of modern instruments to observe in wavelengths invisible to the human eye (radio waves, infrared, ultraviolet, X-ray) increases the amount of information that may be obtained when a transient is studied.

In radio astronomy the LOFAR is looking for radio transients. Radio time domain studies have long included pulsars and scintillation. Projects to look for transients in X-ray and gamma rays include Cherenkov Telescope Array, eROSITA, AGILE, Fermi, HAWC, INTEGRAL, MAXI, Swift Gamma-Ray Burst Mission and Space Variable Objects Monitor. Gamma ray bursts are a well known high energy electromagnetic transient. The proposed ULTRASAT satellite will observe a field of more than 200 square degrees continuously in an ultraviolet wavelength that is particularly important for detecting supernovae within minutes of their occurrence. The proposed Argus Array would act as a smaller Northern Hemisphere counterpart to the Rubin Observatory with a field of 8,000 square degrees and a focus on transients, and would be part of the future Eric Schmidt Observatory System that includes an array of small radio dishes similar to the Square Kilometre Array, a similarly designed array of telescopes linked by fiber to a spectrograph, and a Hubble-scaled visible-light space telescope.

== See also ==
- List of gamma-ray bursts
- Gravitational microlensing
- List of gravitational wave observations
- List of exoplanets detected by microlensing
- X-ray transient
- Cataclysmic variable star
- Stellar pulsation
