= OGLE-2003-BLG-235L =

Microlensing event in the constellation Sagittarius

Observation data Epoch J2000.0 Equinox ICRS
- Constellation: Sagittarius
- Right ascension: 18^{h} 05^{m} 16.35^{s}
- Declination: –28° 53′ 42.0″
- Apparent magnitude (V): 19.7

Characteristics
- Spectral type: K5

Astrometry
Distance	~19000 ly (~5800 pc)

Details
Mass	0.63 ±0.08 M_{☉}

Database references
SIMBAD	data

OGLE-2003-BLG-235L (MOA-2003-BLG-53L) is a star in the constellation of Sagittarius. The first gravitational microlensing event for which a planet orbiting the lens was detected around this star. The event occurred in during July 2003. Two groups observed and independently detected the event: the Optical Gravitational Lensing Experiment (OGLE) and the Microlensing Observations in Astrophysics (MOA), hence, the double designation. It is an orange dwarf star of spectral type K, which is accompanied by a giant planet.

== Lens system ==
OGLE-2003-BLG-235L and MOA-2003-BLG-53L is the designation given to the star in the lens system. In 2004, analysis of the light curve produced as it passed in front of the source star allowed detection of an exoplanet orbiting the star with a mass 0.0039 times that of the host star (this would put it in the jovian mass range). The star was originally assumed to be a red dwarf star, since they are the most common type of star in the galaxy.

By 2006, the source and lens star had moved far enough apart (as viewed from Earth) that their light could be separated. Observations by the Hubble Space Telescope revealed that in fact the lens star was actually brighter and less red than expected, matching the expected spectra for a K dwarf of about 0.63 solar masses, more massive than the average star in the galaxy. This enables an estimate of the distance to the lens star, which puts it at around 5.8 kiloparsecs (19,000 light years) away.

=== Planetary system ===
The OGLE-2003-BLG-235L/MOA-2003-BLG-53L system consists of one planet as determined by the discovery team and the follow-up confirmation observations.

The OGLE-2003-BLG-235L/MOA-2003-BLG-53L planetary system
Companion (in order from star)	Mass	Semimajor axis (AU)	Orbital period (days)	Eccentricity	Inclination (°)	Radius
b	2.6^{+0.8}_{−0.6} M_{J}	4.3^{+2.5}_{−0.8}	—	—	—	—

== See also ==
- Optical Gravitational Lensing Experiment or OGLE
- List of extrasolar planets
