= Robust associations of massive baryonic objects =

Proposed type of star cluster

In astronomy, a RAMBO or robust association of massive baryonic objects is a dark cluster made of brown dwarfs or white dwarfs.

RAMBOs were proposed by Moore and Silk in 1995. They may have an effective radius between 1 and 15 parsecs, with masses in the range 10–100,000 M_{☉}.

The name is a contrived acronym referencing the character John Rambo, in the mold of similar acronyms in astrophysics such as "MACHO" and "WIMP".

== Dynamics ==
The dynamics of these objects, if they do exist, must be quite different from that of standard star clusters. With a very narrow mass range (all brown dwarfs or white dwarfs), the evaporation rate of these RAMBOs should be very slow as predicted by the evolution of simulated mono-component cluster models. Theoretically, these very long-lived objects could exist in large numbers. The presence of a clustered thick disk-like component of dark matter in the Galaxy has been suggested by Sanchez-Salcedo (1997, 1999) and Kerins (1997).

== See also ==
- Dark matter
- Brown dwarfs
- White dwarfs
- Microlensing
- Hypercompact stellar system
- Massive compact halo object (MACHOs)
- Weakly interacting massive particles (WIMPs)
