= Chang–Refsdal lens =

Gravitational lensing model

A Chang–Refsdal lens is a gravitational lensing approximation used to describe a point-mass lens under shearing deformation by a background source. Physically, this may represent a background galaxy and its gravitational influence appearing to deform the caustics of a stellar lens. It is often used in models of lensing behaviors of very wide and very close binary lensing events, and as such has found applications in binary microlensing events, high-magnification events, and stellar microlensing around the galactic center. The model is also used in studies of quasars, supernovae, and gravitational waves. The name originates from a 1979 paper by Kyongae Chang and Sjur Refsdal employing the model to show that background stars could affect quasar image brightness.

Analytically, the Chang-Refsdal lens solves the complex lensing equation by the addition of a shear parameter described by $\gamma$, denoting the deformation by the source:
$$\zeta = z - \frac{1}{\bar{z}} + \gamma \bar{z}$$
where $\zeta$ is the true source location, and $z$ is the image location.

== See also ==
- Gravitational lensing formalism
- Microlensing
- MACHO
- Quasar
- Supernova
