= MOA-2007-BLG-197Lb =

Brown dwarf

Discovery
- Discovered by: Ranc et al.
- Discovery date: 17 August 2015
- Detection method: Gravitational microlensing

Orbital characteristics
- Semi-major axis: 4.3 ± 0.1AU
- Star: MOA-2007-BLG-197L

Physical characteristics
- Mass: 41^{+2}_{−2} M_{J}

MOA-2007-BLG-197Lb is a brown dwarf discovered in August 2015 by the MOA collaboration. It is the first brown dwarf found by the microlensing method to orbit a solar-type star. However, Ranc et al.'s 2015 discovery paper doesn't include the system's constellation or coordinates.

Its host star, MOA-2007-BLG-197L, is a G-K dwarf with 0.82 ± 0.04 solar masses.
