= Sun Hong Rhie =

Korean-American astrophysicist

- Born: 1 March 1955; Gurae, South Korea
- Died: 14 October 2013 (aged 58); South Bend, Indiana
- Education: Stanford University, UCLA
- Known for: Gravitational microlensing
- Scientific career
- Fields: Astrophysics
- Workplaces: University of Notre Dame

Dr. Sun Hong Rhie (1 March 1955 – 14 October 2013) was a Korean–American astrophysicist best known for her foundational contributions to the theory of gravitational microlensing, a technique for the discovery of exoplanets.

== Early life ==
Rhie was born to Lee Sin Woo and Kim Soon Im on 1 March 1955, near Chiri Mountain in Gurae, South Korea. The family later moved to the city of Gwangju for her father's job as a school principal.

== Education ==
She achieved national notoriety for being the top-scoring girl in South Korea in that year's national pre-entrance exams. She attended Seoul National University, where she received her bachelor's degree in physics in 1978. Rhie moved to the United States for her graduate work and received a master's degree in physics from UCLA in 1982. She then transferred to Stanford University, where in 1988 she received her PhD with a thesis on heavy fourth-generation neutrinos, supervised by Fred Gilman. She followed this in 1990 with postdoc positions at the University of California, Berkeley, and Lawrence Livermore National Laboratory. She became a research professor in the department of physics at the University of Notre Dame, where she conducted her most prominent research.

== Contributions to gravitational microlensing ==
When the first gravitational microlensing event, MACHO-LMC-1, was discovered in 1993, Rhie noticed that the light curve had a feature that could be explained by a planetary companion. This was noted by astronomer Phil Yock: "It was at one of these early meetings, probably the 1995 one, that Sun said to me that the first microlensing event found by the MACHO group, the one in the LMC that was shown on the cover of Nature, could include a planet." Along with her husband David Bennett, Rhie developed the first planetary microlensing light-curve code, including finite source effects, that enabled the modeling of planetary microlensing light curves. This discovery, and the prompt detection of such events with the MACHO survey, led to the proposal to NASA of a mission concept that would become known as the Microlensing Planet Finder. Eventually its exoplanet measurement capabilities were combined with similar cosmology capabilities that were subsumed into the Nancy Grace Roman Space Telescope. In 1999, the technique was used to discover the first planet orbiting a binary star.

Her most noteworthy work was her 2003 demonstration, through an elegant perturbation argument, that a lens system of N≥2 point masses can have 5(N − 1) images. The problem is equivalent to a pure analytical question in mathematics concerning the number of zeros of the rational harmonic function of degree N: $f(z)=p(z)/q(z)-\bar{z}$. The result was considered so noteworthy in pure mathematics, it warranted a 2008 review article in the Notices of the American Mathematical Society.

== Personal life ==
She was married to astrophysicist David Bennett and has a daughter. In her later years, Rhie was diagnosed with schizophrenia, limiting her ability to continue her research; unable to tolerate the refereeing of her papers, much of her work is published only at arXiv.org.
