= OGLE-2007-BLG-368Lb =

Cold Neptune

Discovery
- Discovered by: Sumi et al.
- Discovery site: Mount John University; Observatory, New Zealand
- Discovery date: December 8, 2009
- Detection method: Gravitational microlensing

Orbital characteristics
- Star: OGLE-2007-BLG-368L

Physical characteristics
- Mass: 0.0694 M_{J} (22.1 M_{🜨})

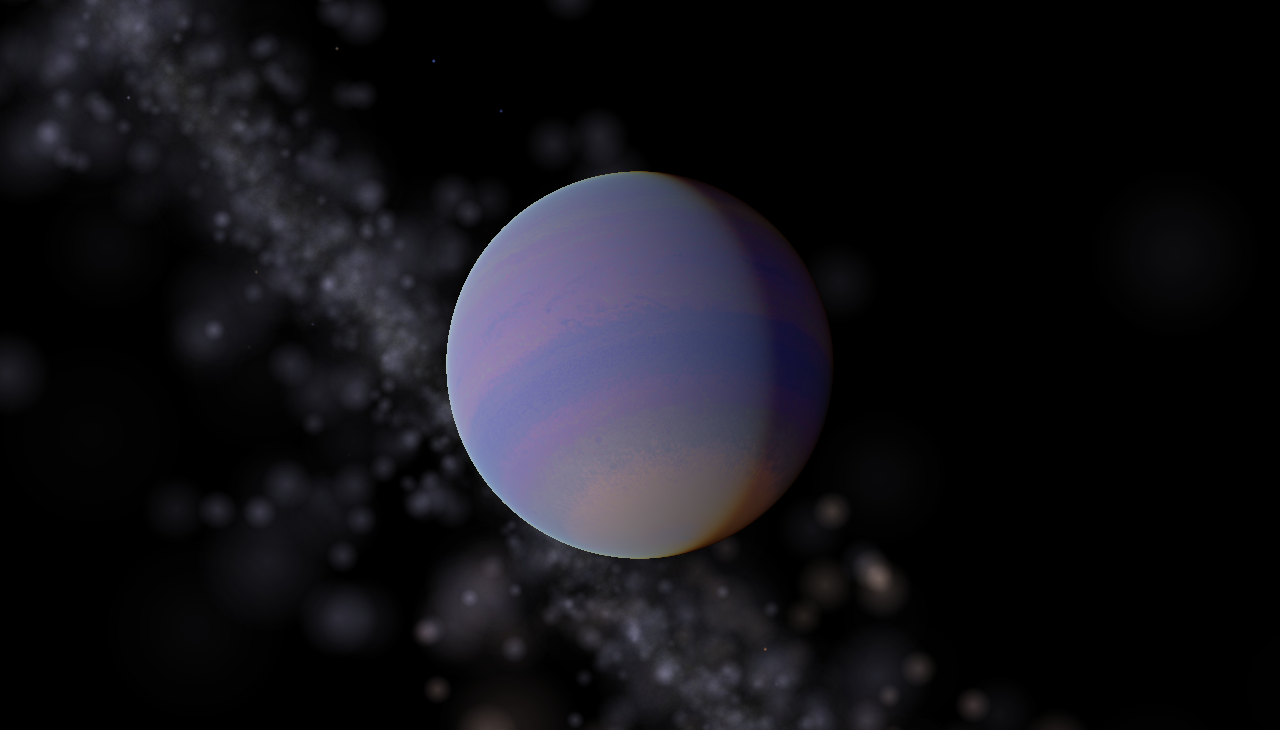

OGLE-2007-BLG-368Lb is an extrasolar planet located approximately 19,230 light-years away in the constellation of Scorpius, orbiting the star OGLE-2007-BLG-368L. This planet was detected on December 8, 2009 by the gravitational microlensing by Sumi. It has mass 6.94% of Jupiter (i.e. 22 times that of Earth) and is located 3.3 AU from the star when observed. Based on those properties it would classify as a Cold Neptune. It is the second Cold Neptune to be observed, the first being OGLE-2005-BLG-169Lb. This planet is most likely be similar to Uranus and Neptune in the Solar System in terms of atmospheric and internal properties.
