= OGLE-2003-BLG-235Lb =

Extrasolar planet in the constellation Sagittarius

OGLE-2003-BLG-235Lb/MOA-2003-BLG-53Lb
Discovery
- Discovered by: Bond et al.
- Discovery date: 15 April 2004
- Detection method: Gravitational microlensing

Orbital characteristics
- Star: OGLE-2003-BLG-235L/ MOA-2003-BLG-53L

Physical characteristics
- Mass: 2.6^{+0.8}_{−0.6} M_{J}

OGLE-2003-BLG-235Lb/MOA-2003-BLG-53Lb is an extrasolar planet discovered in April 2004 by the OGLE and MOA collaborations. Its high mass indicates that it is most probably a gas giant planet similar to Jupiter. It is located around 4.3 AU away from its parent star.
