= MACHO-98-BLG-35 =

Historic gravitational microlensing event located in Sagittarius

Observation data Epoch J2000.0 Equinox ICRS
- Constellation: Sagittarius
- Right ascension: 18^{h} 17^{m} 16.2^{s}
- Declination: −22° 01′ 18″
- Apparent magnitude (V): 20.7

Other designations
- none

Database references
SIMBAD	data

MACHO-98-BLG-35 was a gravitational microlensing event that occurred in July 1998 in the constellation Sagittarius. The red dwarf star causing the lens may have a planet, according to one study.

== Planet ==
The MACHO-98-BLG-35 planetary system
Companion (in order from star)	Mass	Semimajor axis (AU)	Orbital period (days)	Eccentricity	Inclination (°)	Radius
b (unconfirmed)	1 M_{J}	1	—	—	—	—
