= KMT-2020-BLG-0414L =

Star in the constellation Sagittarius

Observation data Epoch J2000 Equinox ICRS
- Constellation: Sagittarius
- Right ascension: 18^{h} 07^{m} 39.60^{s}
- Declination: −28° 29′ 06.8″

Characteristics
- Evolutionary stage: White dwarf

Astrometry
| Distance | 4340+520 −390 ly (1330+160 −120 pc) |

Details
| Mass | 0.49+0.06 −0.03 M_{☉} |

Database references
| SIMBAD | data |
| Exoplanet Archive | data |

KMT-2020-BLG-0414L is a white dwarf star about 4,000 light-years away in the constellation Sagittarius, which is orbited by an Earth-mass exoplanet and a brown dwarf.

== Discovery ==
This system was discovered via the gravitational microlensing event KMT-2020-BLG-0414, when it passed in front of a background star. The discovery observations were made by the Korea Microlensing Telescope Network (KMTNet) in 2020, at a time when many observatories (including two of three KMTNet sites) were shut down due to the COVID-19 pandemic. The discovery was announced in 2021.

Due to the detection method, all that was initially known about the star was its location and mass. By 2024, follow-up observations ruled out the possibility of it being a main-sequence star, so given its mass, it must be a white dwarf.

== Planetary system ==
The planet KMT-2020-BLG-0414Lb is close in mass to Earth and is one of the least massive exoplanets detected by microlensing. It is about twice as far from its star as Earth is from the Sun. The second companion, KMT-2020-BLG-0414Lc, is a brown dwarf about 30 times the mass of Jupiter. It is likely far from its star at about 22 AU (between Uranus and Neptune in the Solar System), though in an unlikely alternative scenario it may be much closer to the star at 0.2 AU.

KMT-2020-BLG-0414Lb is the first confirmed terrestrial planet orbiting a white dwarf; previously only gas giants and asteroidal bodies were known. As such, this planet serves as an analog for Earth in the far future, when the Sun becomes a white dwarf.

The KMT-2020-BLG-0414L planetary system
| Companion (in order from star) | Mass | Semimajor axis (AU) | Orbital period (days) | Eccentricity | Inclination (°) | Radius |
|---|---|---|---|---|---|---|
| b | 1.87+0.27 −0.16 M_{🜨} | 2.07+0.22 −0.11 | — | — | — | — |
| c | 27.0+4.0 −3.1 M_{J} | 22.3+2.4 −1.5 | — | — | — | — |

== See also ==
- MOA-2010-BLG-477L
- List of exoplanets and planetary debris around white dwarfs
