= OGLE-2019-BLG-0960Lb =

Exoplanet

Discovery
- Discovered by: Jennifer C. Yee, et al.
- Discovery site: OGLE
- Discovery date: January 2021
- Detection method: Microlensing

Orbital characteristics
- Semi-major axis: 1.45±0.28—1.90±0.43 AU (Note: Multiple models in Table 4; low and high values quoted here.)
- Star: OGLE-2019-BLG-0960L

Physical characteristics
- Mass: 1.8±0.4—2.5±0.6 M_{🜨}

OGLE-2019-BLG-0960Lb is an exoplanet that was discovered in January 2021 by gravitational microlensing. It is approximately twice the mass of Earth, making it a super-Earth. At the time of discovery, it was the lowest mass-ratio planet to be detected via microlensing; that is, the least massive planet relative to the mass of its host star. Its host star, OGLE-2019-BLG-0960L, has an mass between 0.3 and 0.6 M_{☉}.
