= MOA-2009-BLG-387Lb =

Extrasolar planet in the constellation Sagittarius

Discovery
- Discovered by: Virginie Batista et al.
- Discovery site: SAAO/Perth/Canopus; AO/FCO/Wise/HO/SSO/LSO/ORM
- Discovery date: Published February 21, 2011
- Detection method: Gravitational microlensing

Orbital characteristics
- Semi-major axis: 1.8 ^{+0.9}_{−0.7} AU
- Orbital period (sidereal): 1,970 ^{+2.2}_{−1.6} d 5.4 y
- Star: MOA-2009-BLG-387L

Physical characteristics
- Mass: 2.6 ^{+4.1}_{−1.6} M_{J}

MOA-2009-BLG-387Lb is an exoplanet in the orbit of the red dwarf MOA-2009-BLG-387L. Its discovery was announced on February 21, 2011, making it the eleventh planet discovered using gravitational microlensing. The planet is thought to be over twice the mass of Jupiter and to have an orbit 80 percent larger than that of Earth's, lasting approximately 1,970 days. However, its exact characteristics are difficult to constrain because the characteristics of the host star are not well known.

== Characteristics ==
=== Mass and orbit ===
MOA-2009-BLG-387Lb is a gas giant, with an estimated mass 2.6 times that of Jupiter's and a radius of 1.75 times that of Jupiter and an estimated mean distance of 1.8 AU from its host star. It has an orbital period of approximately 1,970 days. Although the mass and mean distance of MOA-2009-BLG-387Lb is estimated, the confidence intervals are very large, indicating that there is a large uncertainty present. These uncertainties are largely due to how the exact parameters of the host star are not known.

=== Host star ===
The planet is the only one known to be in the orbit of the star MOA-2009-BLG-387L, which is an M-type dwarf star that has a mass that is approximately 0.19 times that of the Sun. The star is located at an estimated 5,700 parsecs (19,000 light-years) from the Earth. The star is named for the Microlensing Observations in Astrophysics group, which saw the star as a gravitational microlensing event in 2009 and combed the data in hope of discovering a planet.

== Discovery ==
MOA-2009-BLG-387 was a gravitational microlensing event detected by the Microlensing Observations in Astrophysics collaboration on July 24, 2009, which searches and documents chance and brief alignments of stars with other stars or objects; such alignments cause a gravitational lens effect, which bends light and causes distorted, but magnified, images that can be interpreted. The detection of two caustics were logged over the next few days by the South African Astronomical Observatory, the Perth Observatory, and the Canopus Hill Observatory in Tasmania, with a separation of about seven days between caustic events.

On June 7, 2010, long after the microlensing event had subsided, the science teams studying the star used the NACO adaptive optics facility at the Very Large Telescope in Chile to determine the actual apparent magnitude of the star that microlensed its background star, hoping to compare it to the magnitude of the star measured during the microlensing event. A discrepancy was found, a discrepancy that may have been a result of either error or of a planetary body. Interpretation of follow-up observations led to the planet's confirmation. The ratio between the planet's mass and its host star's mass is well constrained, but a large interval of uncertainty exists because the host star's mass is known within a large confidence interval that spans the mass of all red dwarf stars.

The discovery of the planet MOA-2009-BLG-387Lb was published on February 21, 2011 in the journal Astronomy and Astrophysics by the European Southern Observatory.
