= OGLE-2014-BLG-0124Lb =

Gas giant orbiting OGLE-2014-BLG-0124L

Discovery
- Discovered by: Udalski et al.
- Discovery site: Mount John University; Observatory, New Zealand
- Discovery date: October 15, 2014
- Detection method: Gravitational microlensing

Orbital characteristics
- Star: OGLE-2014-BLG-0124L

Physical characteristics
- Mass: 0.5 M_{J} (159 M_{🜨})

OGLE-2014-BLG-0124Lb is one of the farthest known planets in the universe. It is approximately 13,000 light years away, located near the center of the galaxy. The planet was discovered using a technique called microlensing. In this case it took 150 days. Two telescopes are used to detect the planet and the time difference between identification by each telescope is used to calculate the distance to the planet. This also contributes to determining the mass of the planet which is about half of Jupiter's. The planet orbits a star with a mass of 0.7 solar masses and is 3.1 AUs from it.

== Technique ==
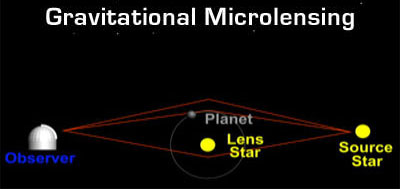

The two telescopes, OGLE and Spitzer, discovered the planet through gravitational microlensing. This is done by observing when the star passes between Earth and another star. The distance at which the star is seen allows us to observe gravity bending the light and the change of brightness shows the existence of the star. If there is a planet orbiting the star, then the astronomer will also see the same thing twice, which helped astronomers discover OGLE-2014-BLG-0124Lb.

== Type of planet ==
OGLE-2014-BLG-0124Lb is known as an exoplanet. These planets are located outside of our solar system. The Kepler telescope has allowed astronomers to discover thousands of these types of planets. Exoplanets obviously range in size, types, and orbits, but using this technique will help us search for planets that are of similar size to Earth. Since microlensing can determine the distance from the planet to the star and astronomers can identify its size, it can help determine if a planet could be habitable.
