= ULTRASAT =

Planned space telescope

Ultraviolet Transient Astronomy Satellite
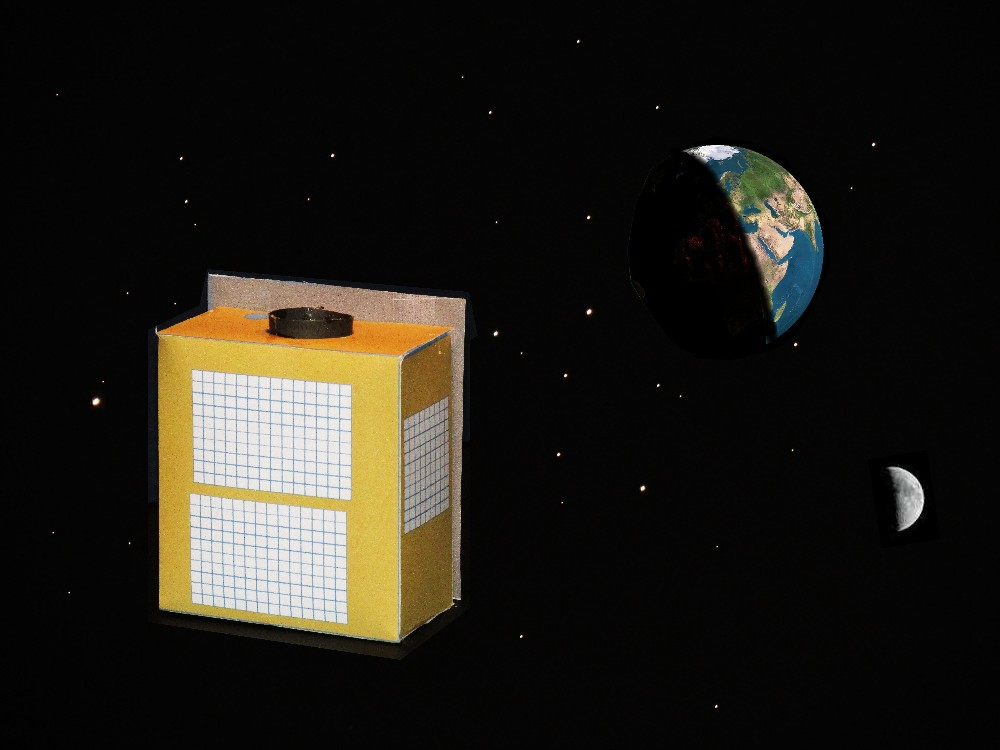
- Model of ULTRASAT
- Names: ULTRASAT
- Mission type: space telescope
- Operator: Israel Space Agency, Weizmann Institute of Science
- Website: www.weizmann.ac.il/ultrasat/

Spacecraft properties
- Manufacturer: Israel Aerospace Industries & Elbit Systems

Start of mission
- Launch date: 2027

ULTRASAT (Ultraviolet Transient Astronomy Satellite) is a space telescope in a smallsat format that will detect and monitor transient astronomical events in the near-ultraviolet (220–280 nm) spectral region. ULTRASAT will observe a large patch of sky with a 210 square degrees field of view, alternating every six months between the southern and northern hemisphere. The satellite is planned to be launched into a geosynchronous orbit in late 2027. All ULTRASAT data will be transmitted to the ground in real time. Upon detection of a transient event, ULTRASAT will provide alerts within 20 minutes to other ground-based and space telescopes to be directed to the source for further observation of the event in other wavelength bands.

ULTRASAT's main objective is to study the hot transient universe. The extragalactic volume accessible to ULTRASAT for the discovery of transient sources will be 300 times larger than that of the most sensitive UV satellite to date, GALEX. It is comparable to that of the largest ground-based optical transient survey telescope planned to begin operation in 2025, the Vera C. Rubin Observatory.

The ULTRASAT spacecraft will be constructed by the Israel Aerospace Industries (IAI), and the telescope will be constructed by the El-Op division of Elbit Systems. ULTRASAT is jointly funded and managed by the Israel Space Agency and the Weizmann Institute of Science (WIS), under the scientific leadership of the WIS, and with a significant contribution of the DESY center of the Helmholtz association. ULTRASAT is planned for a 3-year operation at a GEO orbit. Its small mass and volume, 160 kg and <1m3, allows a launch to GEO as a secondary payload.

== Background ==
The ULTRASAT initiative was born in 2010 in discussions between Weizmann Institute (WIS) and Caltech scientists together with the Israel Space Agency (ISA) to meet the need for a wide field space telescope for studying transient astronomical events, in a small satellite such as those suitable for SMEX. In the preliminary investigation phase, various other bands were considered, including X-ray. The ultraviolet was selected due to the technology maturity, the higher chances of successful implementation and the need to continue exploring this wavelength region. The importance of this project is confirmed in which says that the discovery rate for UV variable sources and UV transients could increase by several orders of magnitude with the launch of a space-based UV mission with a wide field of view (several deg2) and which states that "The proposed ULTRASAT mission could discover hundreds of tidal disruption events per year in the UV.

The project, originally called LIMSAT, was renamed into ULTRASAT in 2011 when a proposal was submitted to NASA for the Explorers program 2012 Mission of Opportunity section, in collaboration with NASA's Ames Research Center. Due to the sequester and NASA budget cuts, no proposal was selected that year. Following considerable changes in the configuration of the telescope, the planned orbit and the satellite bus, a new proposal was submitted in December 2014 in collaboration with JPL, which achieved the rating "Category II", meaning high scientific and technological merits, but was not selected for financing. The current project will not involve NASA, as indicated above. From a concept of eight small refractive UV telescopes on a satellite in low Earth orbit, ULTRASAT evolved to a single wide-field Schmidt telescope in geosynchronous orbit.

== Science ==
Time domain astronomy has potential for making unusual discoveries. Specifically the ultraviolet (UV) variable sky is relatively poorly explored, even though it offers exciting scientific prospects. Welsh, 2005, describes the discoveries made by GALEX, which would be vastly increased by ULTRASAT One field where short cadence UV observations can make a big difference is the explosion marking the death of a star, known as a supernova (SNe). Ganot et al estimated that ULTRASAT would detect more than 100 supernovae per year. The UV signals from SNe precede the optical signal, enabling discovery of the SN at an early stage when the light curve is uncontaminated by later processes.

Since for a transient event there is typically no early warning and the event's position in the sky is of statistical nature, most transients are discovered by ground telescopes with limited fields of view, often long after the start of the event, although dedicated surveys are reducing this to around one day. In order to detect transients in large numbers, near continuous observations of large patches of the sky are required.

Based on the volume of space monitored and the measured SNe rate (from ground surveys) it is expected that at least 100 such events per year will be detected by ULTRASAT within less than a day of the explosion. The wide field of view and the advanced UV detectors will enable the discovery and monitoring of transient sources within a cosmic volume 300 times larger than that of the most powerful UV satellite to date, GALEX). Analysis of the early light curve provides valuable information (stellar radius and surface chemical composition) on the progenitor star (before it exploded) that cannot be found by other means.

In supernovae, an initial burst of high intensity in the UV is followed by radiation in longer wavelengths as the ejected material cools. UV can only be observed from space satellites, because of the blocking effect of the ozone; ground telescopes see only the later stages of the event.

ULTRASAT has been designed to cover an unprecedentedly large field of view with a highly sensitive UV camera, with repeat image times as short as 5 minutes. To maximize the number of detected events, ULTRASAT will point to regions at high celestial latitudes, avoiding the Milky Way with its high concentration of "nearby" stars, diffuse background and galactic dust blocking much of the light from distant galaxies where these events occur.

Combined space-UV and ground-based optical observations triggered by a UV transient explorer would yield a wealth of data about massive star explosions, going beyond the stellar radius (and thus the stellar class of the progenitor: red or blue supergiant, or W-R star).

In addition to detecting early supernovae, ULTRASAT will measure UV light from the large number of stars in its field of view at high temporal resolution, possibly enabling the detection of planetary transits.

ULTRASAT can also be pointed to "Targets of Opportunity" when other instruments give an alert for an interesting event. One of the key science goals of ULTRASAT is the discovery of electro-magnetic emission following the detection of Gravitational waves (GW) from the mergers of binaries involving neutron stars, referred to as Kilonova. Such detections will be the key to using these events for addressing fundamental physics questions, such as the origin of the heaviest elements and the expansion rate of the universe. ULTRASAT will be able to slew in minutes to >50% of the sky, and its wide field-of-view amply covers the angular error regions expected to be provided by GW detectors in the 2020s. It will provide continuous UV light curves as well as early alerts that will enable ground-based follow-up spectroscopy and monitoring of optical and infrared emission predicted to arise later.

Other astrophysical sources yielding a transient UV signal are:

- Gamma-ray burst afterglows (GRB). A wide field UV transient explorer may find the much sought after “orphan” afterglows
- The signal from a tidal disruption event is expected to peak in the UV
- The mass and environments of massive black holes in the centers of galaxies
- Active galactic nuclei
- Variable and flare stars
