= Kyongae Chang =

South Korean astrophysicist

Kyongae Chang (Korean: 장경애, born September 5, 1946) is a South Korean astrophysicist. She is best known for her work on gravitational lensing, including the Chang-Refsdal lens.

Chang was born in Seoul. She graduated Sungkyunkwan University and worked as a research associate on astrometric binaries with Professors van de Kamp and Heintz at Sproul Observatory from 1969 till 1971. From 1975 until 1980 she worked on a Dr. rer. nat. at Hamburg University, graduating with her work on the Chang-Refsdal lens. The main result was published in Nature in 1979 immediately after the discovery of the first gravitational lens.

She returned to Korea in 1985 and became a professor at Cheongju University.
