= MACHO Project =

1992-99 astronomical observational search

In astronomy, the MACHO Project was an observational search during 1992-1999 for dark matter around our Milky Way galaxy in the form of hypothetical MAssive Compact Halo Objects (MACHOs), using the method of gravitational microlensing. It was one of three first-generation microlensing searches started in the early 1990s, the others being the independent EROS and OGLE projects. The MACHO project was carried out by a team of US and Australian astronomers; observations used the 1.27-metre (50-inch) telescope at the Mount Stromlo Observatory near Canberra, which was dedicated to the project full-time from 1992 until 1999. The project did not solve the dark matter problem, but placed important upper limits on the fraction of dark matter in MACHOs across a wide range of masses, and achieved several notable discoveries in the field of microlensing, and new results on several classes of variable stars.

== Microlensing ==
If a compact object (which may be dark or bright) is located very close to the line of sight to a background star, then gravitational lensing causes the star to appear to split into two images on opposite sides of the compact object (or a complete ring if the alignment is almost perfect). Microlensing refers to the special case of lensing where the two images are too close to be seen as separate objects in a telescope, but the time-varying geometry (as the source and lens move) causes the apparent brightness (the sum of the two images) to vary with time; this variation has a characteristic shape which can be calculated theoretically. Microlensing is predicted and observed to be very rare, typically less than 1 star per million microlensed at any given moment in time, but it is a powerful technique because the effect relies only on the gravity of the lensing object, rather than its light: therefore it is sensitive to completely dark or very faint objects including black holes, substellar brown dwarfs and remnants of dead stars (e.g. old white dwarfs and neutron stars). For these reasons, microlensing is very useful for testing whether dark matter is made of such objects.

== Observations ==
The 1.27-metre (50 in) telescope at Mt. Stromlo was refurbished for the project, and equipped with a prime-focus wide-field corrector, a dichroic beamsplitter and a pair of 16 megapixel CCD cameras (between 1992 and 1995, this was the largest CCD system in astronomical use). The cameras imaged a 42 by 42 arcminute square field of sky in two colours (blue-green and red light) simultaneously. Every clear night, the system monitored dense star fields, up to 80 fields in the Large Magellanic Cloud or 100 fields in the Galactic Bulge on a regular basis, with each field observed from twice per night to weekly, depending on field priority and season. From this image data, light curves (brightness vs time) were constructed for over 8 million stars in the LMC, and 15 million stars in the Bulge; large computer searches were then run to find brightening events characteristic of microlensing, and also variable stars.

== Results ==
The project made a number of notable discoveries documented in around 35 scientific papers published between 1993 and 2003: the most important results were firstly, upper limits on the contribution of MACHOs to the dark matter in the Milky Way: no more than xx percent can be composed of MACHOs between xx solar masses () and xx solar masses; secondly, confirmation that microlensing occurs as expected, based on large samples of events with the theoretically predicted properties.

The project also achieved several "firsts" in microlensing, including the following:

- The first strong detection of microlensing of a star, in 1993.
- First real-time announcement of an ongoing microlensing event, in 1994.
- First observation of parallax effects in a microlensing event, in 1995.

== Later developments ==
The MACHO project completed observations in December 1999; after 2000 the telescope+camera system was then used for a supernova search, but this was cut short when the telescope was destroyed by the January 2003 Canberra bushfires.

Several other microlensing surveys continued, including the OGLE and MOA projects, with the main focus after 2000 changing towards microlensing as a method for detection of exoplanets. Microlensing planet searches are especially sensitive to low-mass exoplanets and those in fairly wide orbits (many astronomical units, beyond the snow-line), and are also the only way of detecting "orphan planets" ejected from their parent systems; so microlensing planet searches are complementary to the better-known radial velocity and transit methods. As of 2017 the new Korean Microlensing Telescope Network (KMTNet) is a new-generation microlensing survey. The future NASA NGRST space mission (planned launch c. 2027) includes a substantial microlensing planet survey as one of its key projects.
