= MOA-2007-BLG-400Lb =

Extrasolar planet in the constellation Sagittarius

Discovery
- Discovered by: Dong et al.
- Discovery site: Mount John University; Observatory, New Zealand
- Discovery date: September 18, 2008
- Detection method: Gravitational microlensing

Orbital characteristics
- Star: MOA-2007-BLG-400L

Physical characteristics
- Mass: 0.9 ± 0.4 M_{J}

MOA-2007-BLG-400Lb is an extrasolar planet located approximately 20000 light-years away in the constellation of Sagittarius, orbiting the star MOA-2007-BLG-400L. This planet was detected on September 18, 2008 by the gravitational microlensing by Dong. It has mass between 50% and 130% of Jupiter and orbits between 0.6 and 1.1 AU.
