= Massive compact halo object =

Hypothetical form of dark matter in galactic halos

A Massive Compact Halo Object (MACHO) is a kind of astronomical body that might explain the apparent presence of dark matter in galactic halos. A MACHO is a body that emits little or no radiation and drifts through interstellar space unassociated with any planetary system (and may or may not be composed of normal baryonic matter). Since MACHOs are not luminous, they are hard to detect. MACHO candidates include black holes or neutron stars as well as brown dwarfs and rogue planets. White dwarfs and very faint red dwarfs have also been proposed as candidate MACHOs. The term was coined by astrophysicist Kim Griest.

== Detection ==
A MACHO may be detected when it passes in front of or nearly in front of a star and the MACHO's gravity bends the light, causing the star to appear brighter in an example of gravitational lensing known as gravitational microlensing. Several groups have searched for MACHOs by searching for the microlensing amplification of light. These groups have ruled out dark matter being explained by MACHOs with mass in the range 1×10^{−8} solar masses (0.3 lunar masses) to 100 solar masses. One group, the MACHO collaboration, claimed in 2000 to have found enough microlensing to predict the existence of many MACHOs with mean mass of about 0.5 solar masses, enough to make up perhaps 20% of the dark matter in the galaxy. This suggests that MACHOs could be white dwarfs or red dwarfs which have similar masses. However, red and white dwarfs are not completely dark; they do emit some light, and so can be searched for with the Hubble Space Telescope and with proper motion surveys. These searches have ruled out the possibility that these objects make up a significant fraction of dark matter in our galaxy. Another group, the EROS2 collaboration, does not confirm the signal claims by the MACHO group. They did not find enough microlensing effect with a sensitivity higher by a factor 2. Observations using the Hubble Space Telescope's NICMOS instrument showed that less than one percent of the halo mass is composed of red dwarfs. This corresponds to a negligible fraction of the dark matter halo mass. Therefore, the missing mass problem is not solved by red or white dwarf MACHOs.

== Types ==
MACHOs may sometimes be considered to include black holes. Isolated black holes without any matter around them are truly black in that they emit no light and any light shone upon them is absorbed and not reflected. A black hole can sometimes be detected by the halo of bright gas and dust that forms around it as an accretion disk being pulled in by the black hole's gravity. Such a disk can generate jets of gas that are shot out away from the black hole because it cannot be absorbed quickly enough. An isolated black hole, however, would not have an accretion disk and would only be detectable by gravitational lensing. Cosmologists doubt non-direct collapse black holes make up a majority of dark matter because the black holes are at isolated points of the galaxy. The largest contributor to the missing mass must be spread throughout the galaxy to balance the gravity. A minority of physicists, including Chapline and Laughlin, believe that the widely accepted model of the black hole is wrong and needs to be replaced by a new model, the dark-energy star; in the general case for the suggested new model, the cosmological distribution of dark energy would be slightly lumpy and dark-energy stars of primordial type might be a possible candidate for MACHOs.

Neutron stars, unlike black holes, are not heavy enough to collapse completely, and instead form a material rather like that of an atomic nucleus called neutron matter. After sufficient time these stars could radiate away enough energy to become cold enough that they would be too faint to see. Likewise, old white dwarfs may also become cold and dead, eventually becoming black dwarfs, although the universe is not thought to be old enough for any stars to have reached this stage.

Brown dwarfs have also been proposed as MACHO candidates. Brown dwarfs are sometimes called "failed stars" as they do not have enough mass for nuclear fusion to begin once their gravity causes them to collapse. Brown dwarfs are about thirteen to seventy-five times the mass of Jupiter. The contraction of material forming the brown dwarf heats them up so they only glow feebly at infrared wavelengths, making them difficult to detect. A survey of gravitational lensing effects in the direction of the Small Magellanic Cloud and Large Magellanic Cloud did not detect the number and type of lensing events expected if brown dwarfs made up a significant fraction of dark matter.

== Theoretical considerations ==
Theoretical work has also shown that ancient MACHOs are not likely to account for the large amounts of dark matter now thought to be present in the universe. The Big Bang as it is currently understood could not have produced enough baryons and still be consistent with the observed elemental abundances, including the abundance of deuterium. Furthermore, separate observations of baryon acoustic oscillations, both in the cosmic microwave background and large-scale structure of galaxies, set limits on the ratio of baryons to the total amount of matter. These observations show that a large fraction of non-baryonic matter is necessary regardless of the presence or absence of MACHOs; however, MACHO candidates such as primordial black holes could be formed of non-baryonic matter (from pre-baryonic epochs of the early Big Bang).

== See also ==
- Weakly interacting massive particles (WIMPS), an alternative theory of dark matter
- Robust associations of massive baryonic objects (RAMBOs)
- MACHO Project, an observational search for MACHOs
