= MOA-2007-BLG-192Lb =

Terrestrial ice planet orbiting MOA-2007-BLG-192L

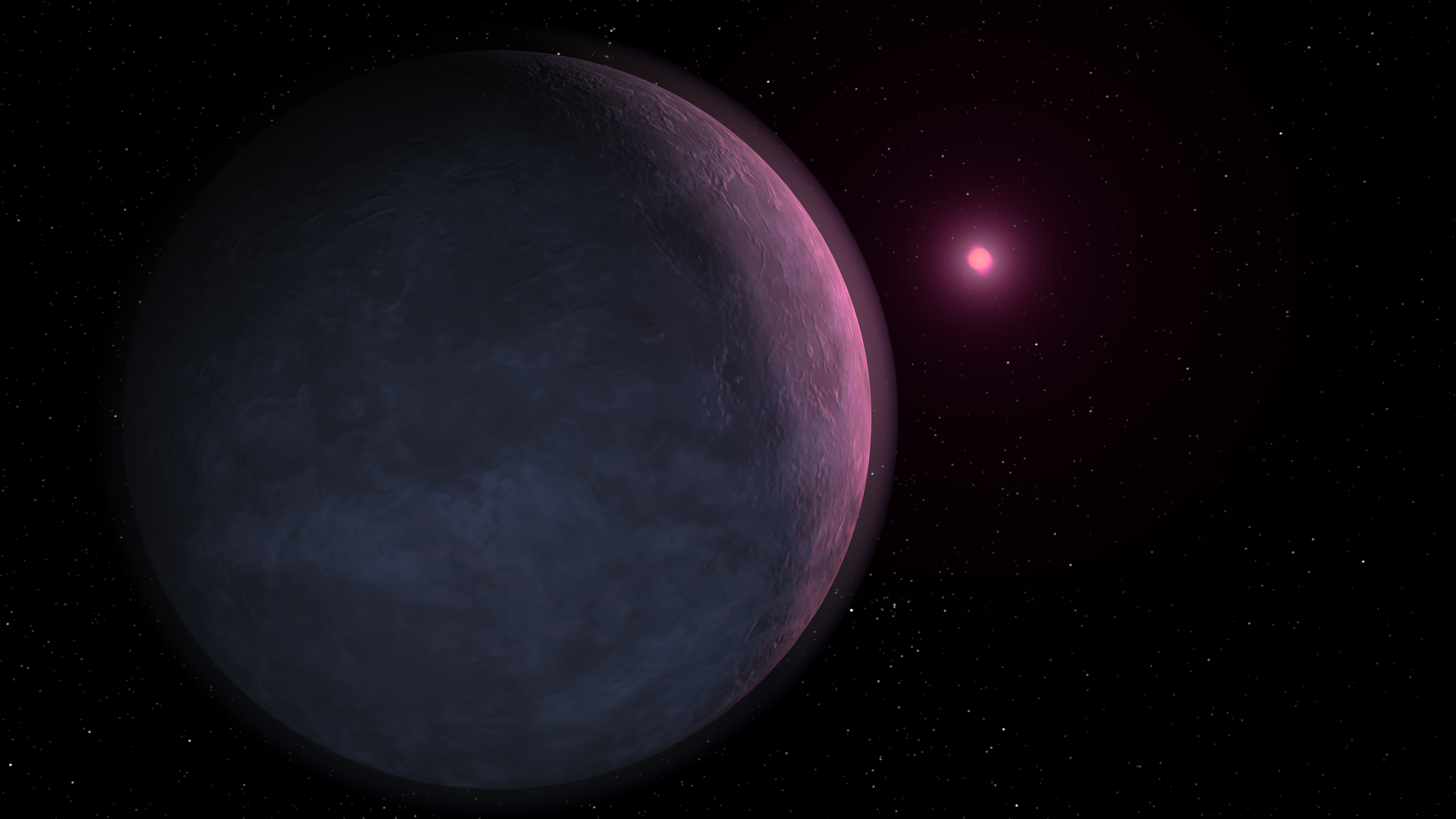
- An artist's impression of MOA-2007-BLG-192Lb orbiting its primary

Discovery
- Discovered by: Bennett et al.
- Discovery site: Mount John University; Observatory, New Zealand
- Discovery date: 30 May 2008
- Detection method: Gravitational microlensing

Orbital characteristics
- Semi-major axis: 2.02±0.44 AU
- Star: MOA-2007-BLG-192L

Physical characteristics
- Mass: 12.49+65.47 −8.03 M_{🜨} (likely between 3 and 12 M_{🜨})

MOA-2007-BLG-192Lb, occasionally shortened to MOA-192 b, is an extrasolar planet approximately 7,000 light-years away in the constellation of Sagittarius. The planet was discovered orbiting the low-mass star MOA-2007-BLG-192L. It was found when it caused a gravitational microlensing event on May 24, 2007, which was detected as part of the MOA-II microlensing survey at the Mount John University Observatory in New Zealand.

The mass of the planet is not well known. It is anything between 2.75 and 105 Earth masses (M_{🜨}), although it is more likely to be between 3 and 12 M_{🜨}. The mass range also means that the planet's classification varies, from a Super-Earth to a Sub-Saturn. It is located at 2.02 astronomical units from its host star.

== Host star ==
MOA-2007-BLG-192L
Observation data Epoch J2000.0 Equinox ICRS
- Constellation: Sagittarius (Note: Obtained with a right ascension of 18^{h} 18^{m} 03.8^{s} and a declination of −27° 09′ 00.27″ on this website.)
- Right ascension: 18^{h} 18^{m} 03.8^{s}
- Declination: −27° 09′ 00.27″

Characteristics
- Evolutionary stage: Red dwarf
- Spectral type: M

Astrometry
Distance	7040±980 ly (2160±300 pc)

Details
Mass	0.28±0.04 M_{☉}

Database references
SIMBAD	data

MOA-2007-BLG-192L is a red dwarf star, one of the smallest and least massive type of stars, as well as one of the most numerous in the Milky Way. It was initially estimated to have a mass 6% the mass of the Sun, which would probably be too low to sustain nuclear fusion at its core, making it a dimly glowing brown dwarf. However, this mass was based on an erroneous parallax, and a further analysis suggest a higher mass of 0.28 M_{☉}. This would make it a red dwarf.

Both MOA-2007-BLG-192L and its planet are located at a distance of 2,160 pc (7,000 ly) from Earth, in the direction of the constellation Sagittarius.
