= Microlensing Observations in Astrophysics =

Astronomical research project

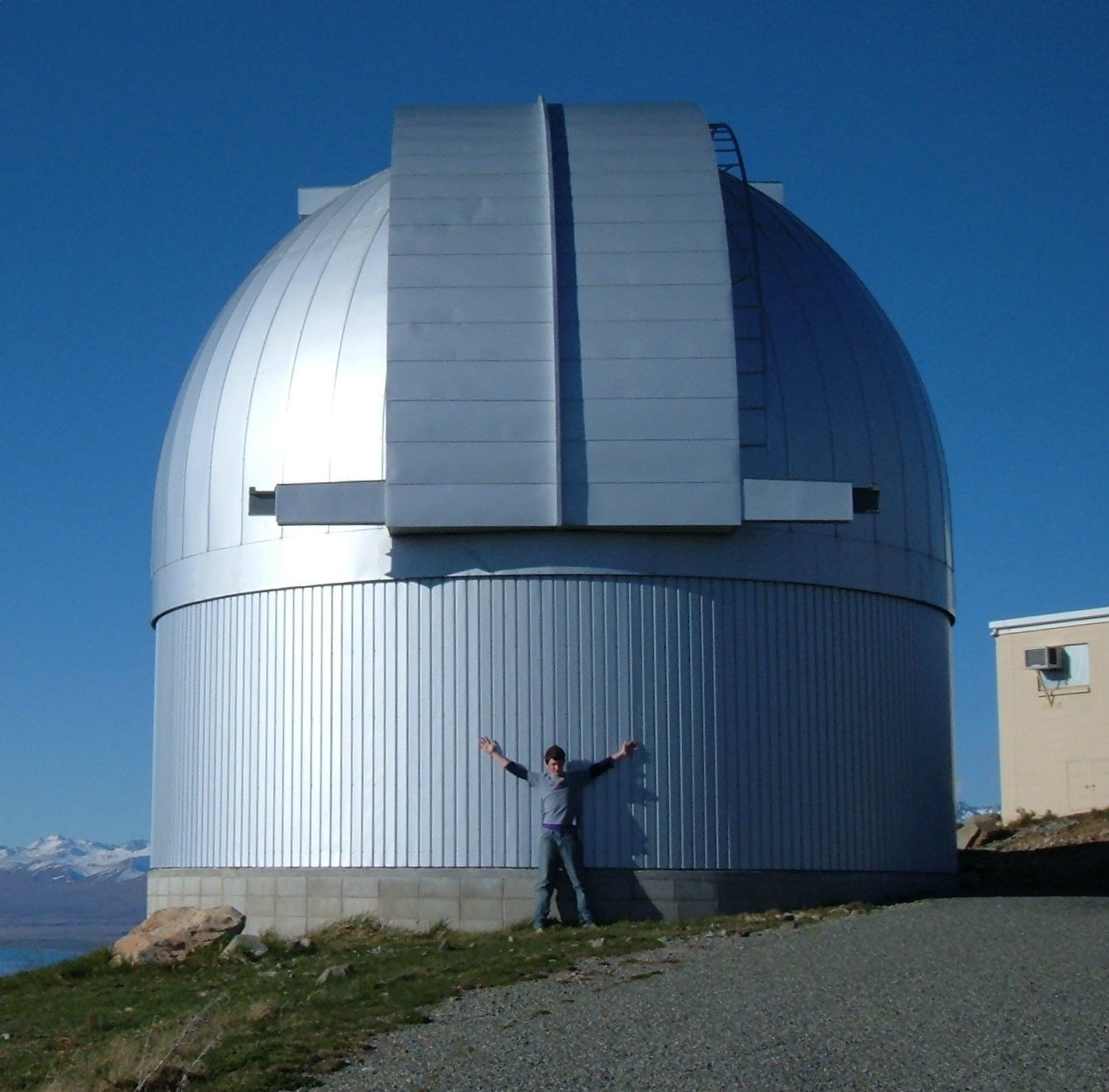
The Microlensing Observations in Astrophysics (MOA) telescope dome at the top of Mount John Observatory.

Microlensing Observations in Astrophysics (MOA) is a collaborative project between researchers in New Zealand and Japan, led by Professor Yasushi Muraki of Nagoya University. They use microlensing to observe dark matter, extra-solar planets, and stellar atmospheres from the Southern Hemisphere. The group concentrates especially on the detection and observation of gravitational microlensing events of high magnification, of order 100 or more, as these provide the greatest sensitivity to extrasolar planets. They work with other groups in Australia, the United States and elsewhere. Observations are conducted at New Zealand's Mt. John University Observatory using a 1.8 m (70.9 in) reflector telescope built for the project.

In September 2020, astronomers using microlensing techniques reported the detection, for the first time, of an earth-mass rogue planet unbounded by any star, and free floating in the Milky Way galaxy. In January 2022 in collaboration with Optical Gravitational Lensing Experiment (OGLE) they reported in a preprint the first rogue BH while there have been others candidates this is the most solid detection so far as their technique allowed to measure not only the amplification of light but also its deflection by the BH from the microlensing data.

== MOA telescope mirror images ==
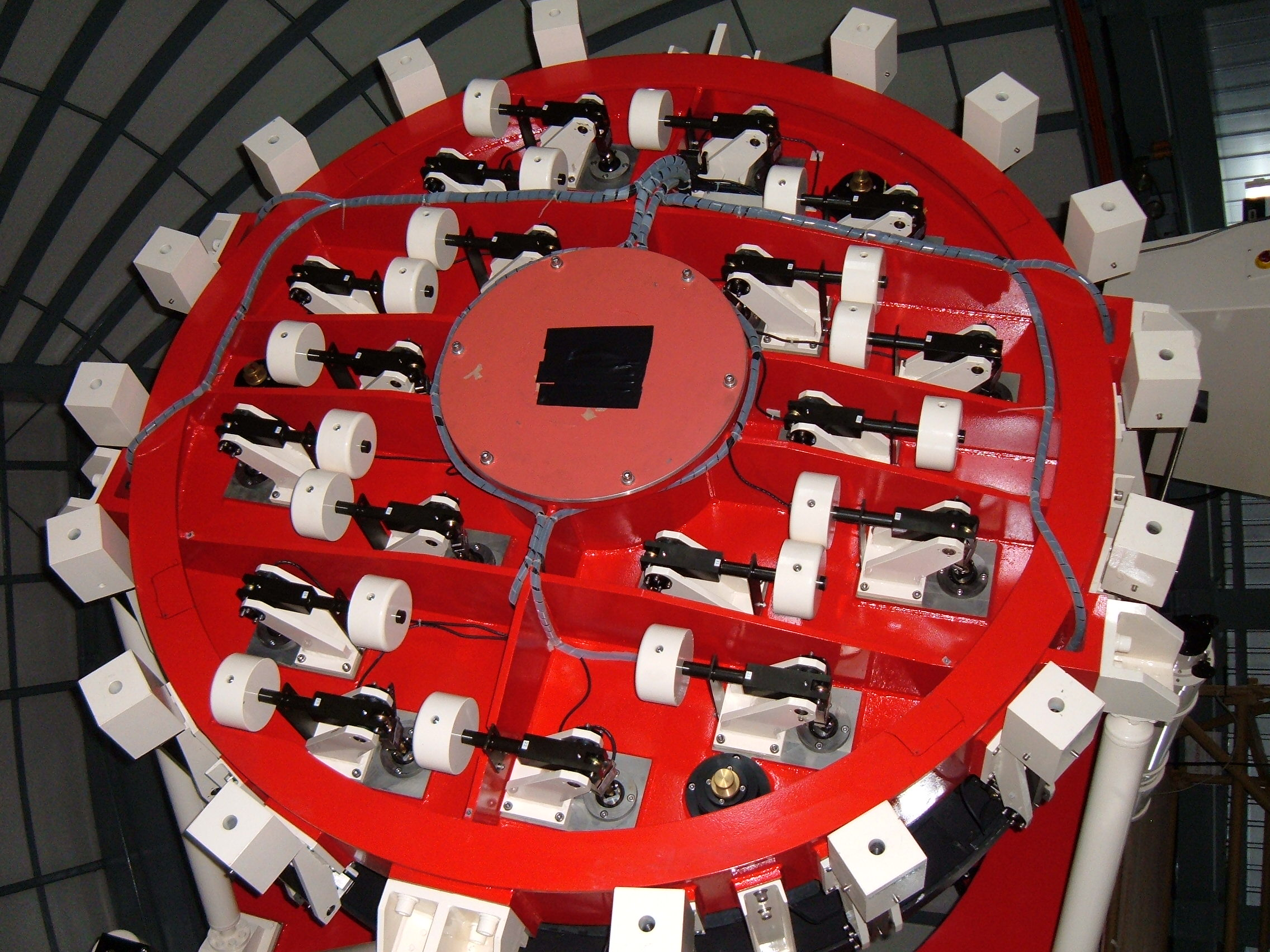
Underside of main mirror

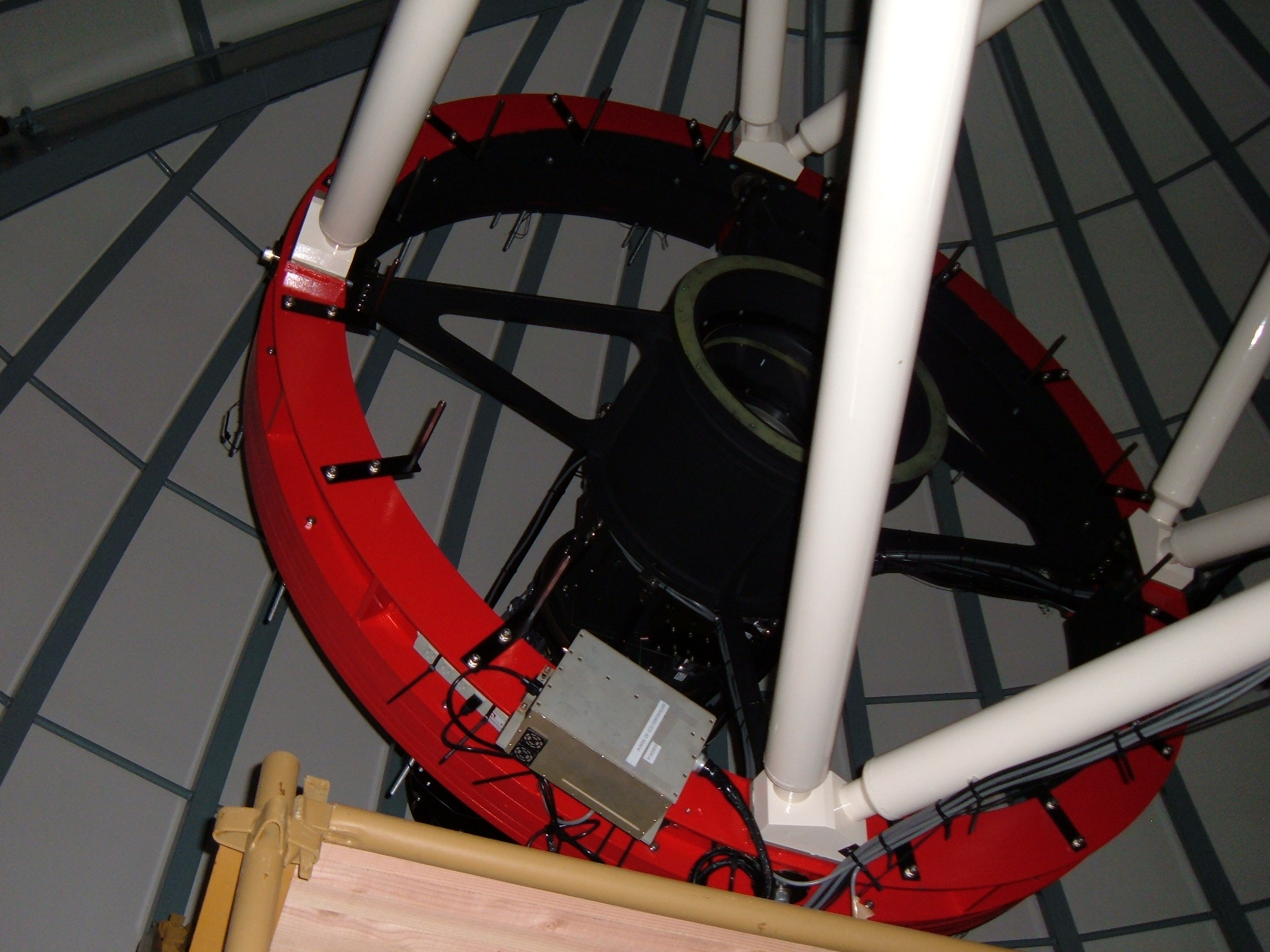
Camera assembly

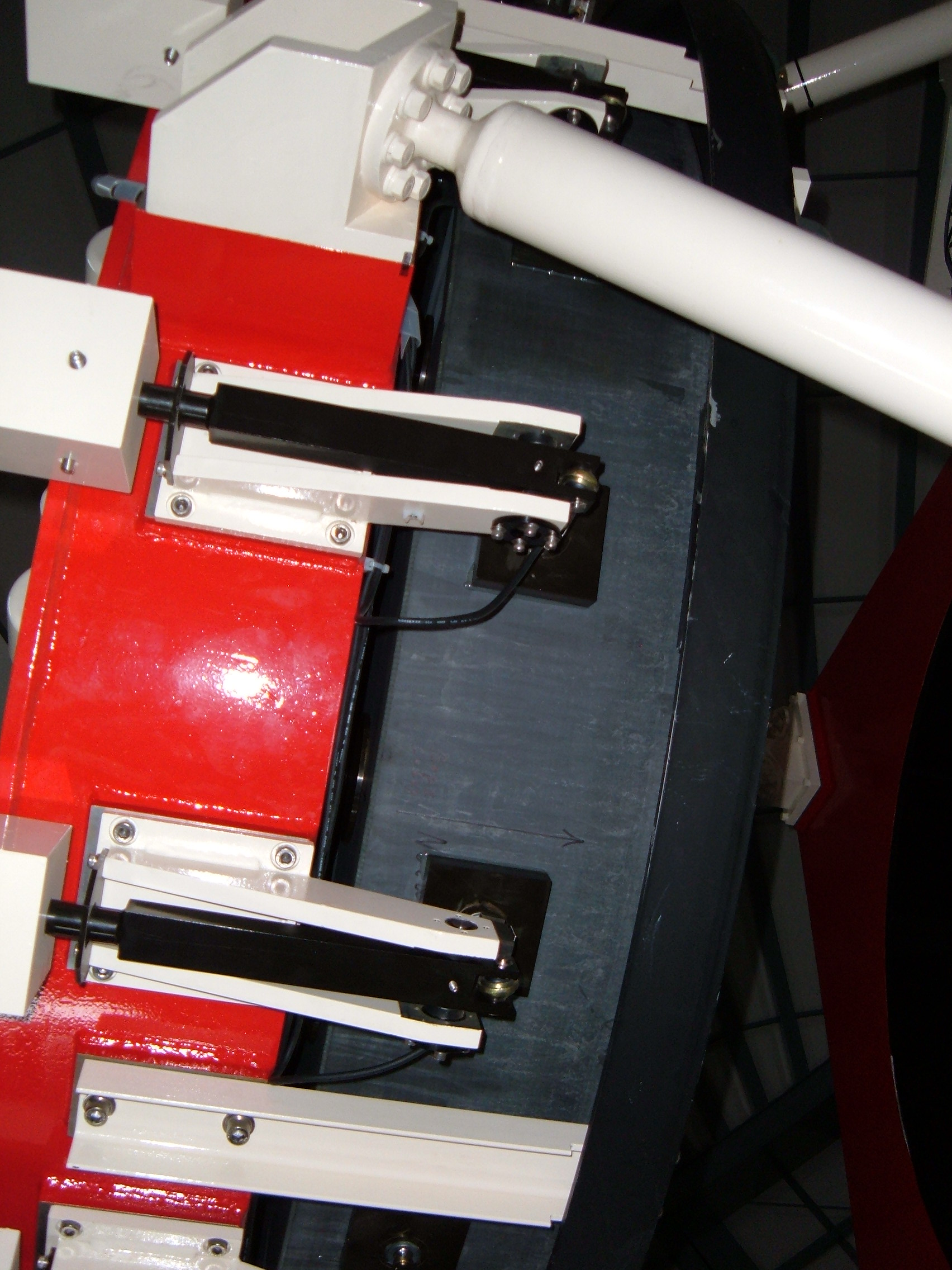
Main mirror, side view

== Planets discovered ==
The following planets have been announced by this survey, some in conjunction with other surveys.

| Planet | Date announced |
|---|---|
| MOA-2020-BLG-208Lb | October 2022 |
| MOA-2020-BLG-135Lb | April 2022 |
| MOA-2014-BLG-472Lb | June 2021 |
| MOA-2007-BLG-197Lb | May 2015 |
| MOA-2008-BLG-379Lb | November 2013 |
| MOA-2011-BLG-322Lb | September 2013 |
| MOA-bin-1b | May 2012 |
| MOA-2009-BLG-387Lb | February 2011 |
| MOA-2007-BLG-400Lb | September 18, 2008 |
| MOA-2007-BLG-192Lb | May 30, 2008 |
| OGLE-2003-BLG-235b/MOA-2003-BLG-53b | April 15, 2004 |

== See also ==
- Optical Gravitational Lensing Experiment or OGLE, a similar microlensing survey
- List of extrasolar planets
