= Gravitational microlensing =

Astronomical phenomenon due to the gravitational lens effect

Gravitational microlensing is an astronomical phenomenon caused by the gravitational lens effect. It can be used to detect objects that range from the mass of a planet to the mass of a star, regardless of the light they emit. Typically, astronomers can only detect bright objects that emit much light (stars) or large objects that block background light (clouds of gas and dust). These objects make up only a minor portion of the mass of a galaxy. Microlensing allows the study of objects that emit little or no light.

Gravitational microlensing of the light of a distant background star by a passing rogue exoplanet

Gravitational microlensing of the light of a distant background star by a passing exoplanet with a host star

When a distant star or quasar gets sufficiently aligned with a massive compact foreground object, the bending of light due to its gravitational field, as discussed by Albert Einstein in 1915, leads to two distorted images (generally unresolved), resulting in an observable magnification. The time-scale of the transient brightening depends on the mass of the foreground object as well as on the relative proper motion between the background 'source' and the foreground 'lens' object.

Ideally aligned microlensing produces a clear buffer between the radiation from the lens and source objects. It magnifies the distant source, revealing it or enhancing its size and/or brightness. It enables the study of the population of faint or dark objects such as brown dwarfs, red dwarfs, planets, white dwarfs, neutron stars, black holes, and massive compact halo objects. Such lensing works at all wavelengths, magnifying and producing a wide range of possible warping for distant source objects that emit any kind of electromagnetic radiation.

Microlensing by an isolated object was first detected in 1989. Since then, microlensing has been used to constrain the nature of the dark matter, detect exoplanets, study limb darkening in distant stars, constrain the binary star population, and constrain the structure of the Milky Way's disk. Microlensing has also been proposed as a means to find dark objects like brown dwarfs and black holes, study starspots, measure stellar rotation, and probe quasars including their accretion disks. Microlensing was used in 2018 to detect Icarus, then the most distant star ever observed.

== How it works ==
Microlensing is based on the gravitational lens effect. A massive object (the lens) will bend the light of a bright background object (the source). This can generate multiple distorted, magnified, and brightened images of the background source.

Microlensing is caused by the same physical effect as strong gravitational lensing and weak gravitational lensing but it is studied by very different observational techniques. In strong and weak lensing, the mass of the lens is large enough (mass of a galaxy or galaxy cluster) that the displacement of light by the lens can be resolved with a high resolution telescope such as the Hubble Space Telescope. With microlensing, the lens mass is too low (mass of a planet or a star) for the displacement of light to be observed easily, but the apparent brightening of the source may still be detected. In such a situation, the lens will pass by the source in a reasonable amount of time, seconds to years instead of millions of years. As the alignment changes, the source's apparent brightness changes, and this can be monitored to detect and study the event. Thus, unlike with strong and weak gravitational lenses, microlensing is a transient astronomical event from a human timescale perspective, thus a subject of time-domain astronomy.

Unlike with strong and weak lensing, no single observation can establish that microlensing is occurring. Instead, the rise and fall of the source brightness must be monitored over time using photometry. This function of brightness versus time is known as a light curve. A typical microlensing light curve is shown below:

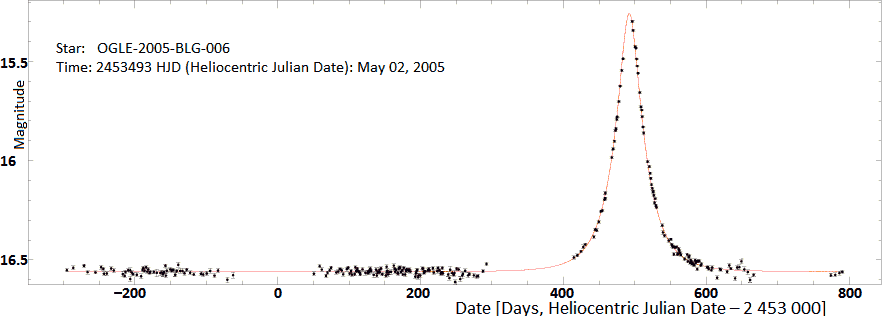
Typical light curve of gravitational microlensing event (OGLE-2005-BLG-006) with its model fitted (red)

A typical microlensing event like this one has a very simple shape, and only one physical parameter can be extracted: the time scale, which is related to the lens mass, distance, and velocity. There are several effects, however, that contribute to the shape of more atypical lensing events:

- Lens mass distribution. If the lens mass is not concentrated in a single point, the light curve can be dramatically different, particularly with caustic-crossing events, which may exhibit strong spikes in the light curve. In microlensing, this can be seen when the lens is a binary star or a planetary system.
- Finite source size. In extremely bright or quickly-changing microlensing events, like caustic-crossing events, the source star cannot be treated as an infinitesimally small point of light: the size of the star's disk and even limb darkening can modify extreme features.
- Parallax. For events lasting for months, the motion of the Earth around the Sun can cause the alignment to change slightly, affecting the light curve.

Most focus is currently on the more unusual microlensing events, especially those that might lead to the discovery of extrasolar planets.

Another way to get more information from microlensing events involves measuring the astrometric shifts in the source position during the course of the event and even resolving the separate images with interferometry. The first successful resolution of microlensing images was achieved with the GRAVITY instrument on the Very Large Telescope Interferometer (VLTI). When the two images of the source are not resolved (that is, are not separately detectable by the available instruments), the measured position is an average of the two positions, weighted by their brightness. This is called the position of the centroid. If the source is, say, far to the "right" of the lens, then one image will be very close to the true position of the source and the other will be very close to the lens on its left side, and very small or dim. In this case, the centroid is practically in the same position as the source. If the sky position of the source is close to that of the lens and on the right, the main image will be a bit further to the right of the true source position, and the centroid will be to the right of the true position. But as the source gets even closer in the sky to the lens position, the two images become symmetrical and equal in brightness, and the centroid will again be very close to the true position of the source. When alignment is perfect, the centroid is exactly at the same position as the source (and the lens). In this case, there will not be two images but an Einstein ring around the lens.

== Observing microlensing ==
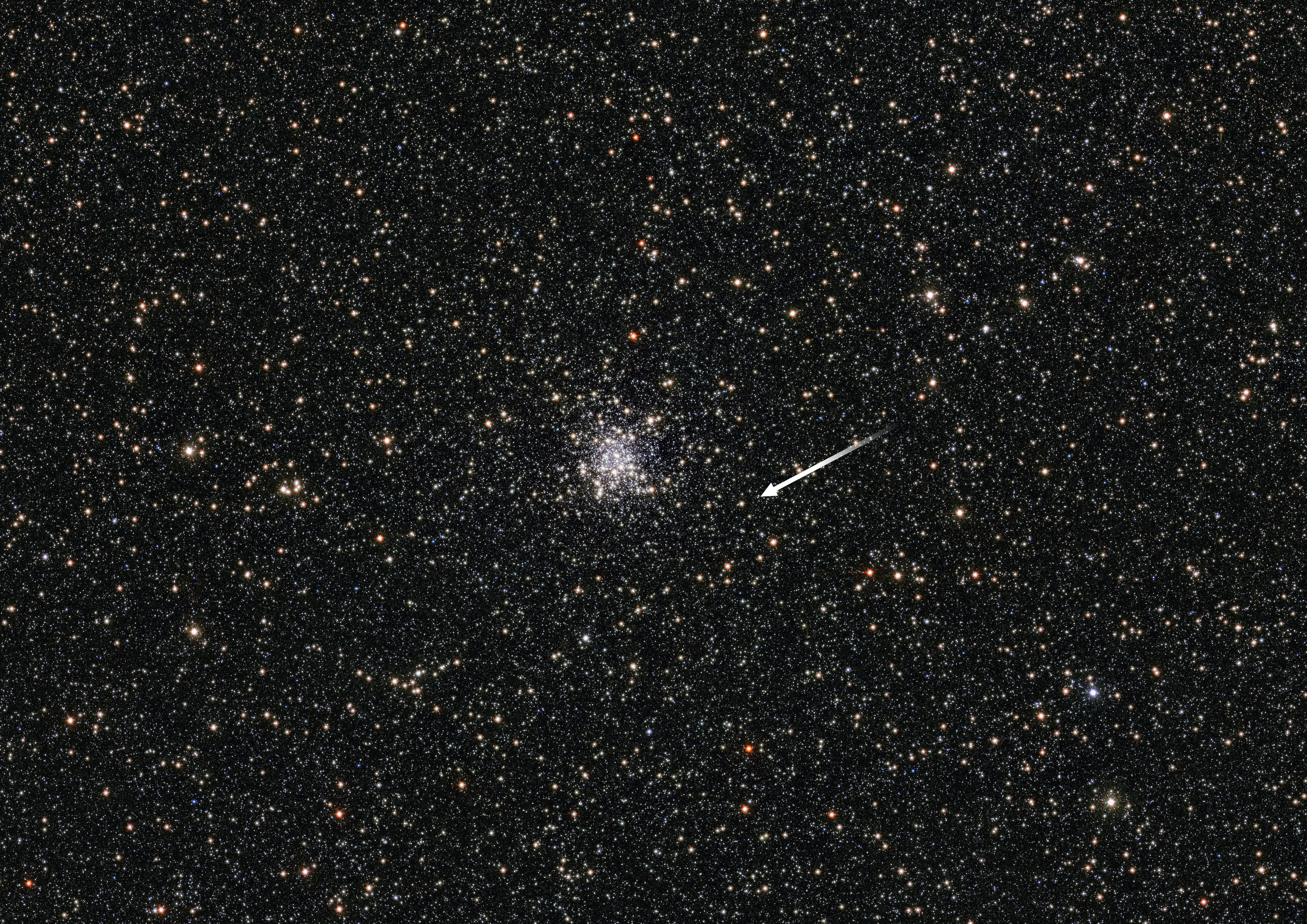
The object causing the microlensing in NGC 6553 bent the light of a red giant star in the background.

In practice, because the alignment needed is so precise and difficult to predict, microlensing is very rare. Events, therefore, are generally found with surveys, which photometrically monitor tens of millions of potential source stars, every few days for several years. Dense background fields suitable for such surveys are nearby galaxies, such as the Magellanic Clouds and the Andromeda galaxy, and the Milky Way bulge.

Microlensing events over the galactic map as observed by GAIA from 2014 to 2018 (Timer on bottom left corner)

In each case, the lens population studied comprises the objects between Earth and the source field: for the bulge, the lens population is the Milky Way disk stars, and for external galaxies, the lens population is the Milky Way halo, as well as objects in the other galaxy itself. The density, mass, and location of the objects in these lens populations determines the frequency of microlensing along that line of sight, which is characterized by a value known as the optical depth due to microlensing. (This is not to be confused with the more common meaning of optical depth, although it shares some properties.) The optical depth is, roughly speaking, the average fraction of source stars undergoing microlensing at a given time, or equivalently the probability that a given source star is undergoing lensing at a given time. The MACHO project found the optical depth toward the LMC to be 1.2×10^{−7}, and the optical depth toward the bulge to be 2.43×10^{−6} or about 1 in 400,000.

Complicating the search is the fact that for every star undergoing microlensing, there are thousands of stars changing in brightness for other reasons (about 2% of the stars in a typical source field are naturally variable stars) and other transient events (such as novae and supernovae), and these must be weeded out to find true microlensing events. After a microlensing event in progress has been identified, the monitoring program that detects it often alerts the community to its discovery, so that other specialized programs may follow the event more intensively, hoping to find interesting deviations from the typical light curve. This is because these deviations – particularly ones due to exoplanets – require hourly monitoring to be identified, which the survey programs are unable to provide while still searching for new events. The question of how to prioritize events in progress for detailed followup with limited observing resources is very important for microlensing researchers today.

== History ==
Already in his book The Queries (query number 1), expanded from 1704 to 1718, Isaac Newton wondered if a light ray could be deflected by gravity. In 1801, Johann Georg von Soldner calculated the amount of deflection of a light ray from a star under Newtonian gravity. In 1915 Albert Einstein correctly predicted the amount of deflection under General Relativity, which was twice the amount predicted by von Soldner. Einstein's prediction was validated by a 1919 expedition led by Arthur Eddington, which was a great early success for General Relativity. In 1924 Orest Chwolson found that lensing could produce multiple images of the star. A correct prediction of the concomitant brightening of the source, the basis for microlensing, was published in 1936 by Einstein. Because of the unlikely alignment required, he concluded that "there is no great chance of observing this phenomenon". Gravitational lensing's modern theoretical framework was established with works by Yu Klimov (1963), Sidney Liebes (1964), and Sjur Refsdal (1964).

Gravitational lensing was first observed in 1979, in the form of a quasar lensed by a foreground galaxy. That same year Kyongae Chang and Sjur Refsdal showed that individual stars in the lens galaxy could act as smaller lenses within the main lens, causing the source quasar's images to fluctuate on a timescale of months, also known as Chang–Refsdal lens. Peter J. Young then appreciated that the analysis needed to be extended to allow for the simultaneous effect of many stars. Bohdan Paczyński first used the term "microlensing" to describe this phenomenon. This type of microlensing is difficult to identify because of the intrinsic variability of quasars, but in 1989 Mike Irwin et al. published detection of microlensing of one of the four images in the "Einstein Cross" quasar in Huchra's Lens.

In 1986, Paczyński proposed using microlensing to look for dark matter in the form of massive compact halo objects (MACHOs) in the Galactic halo, by observing background stars in a nearby galaxy. Two groups of particle physicists working on dark matter heard his talks and joined with astronomers to form the Anglo-Australian MACHO collaboration and the French EROS collaboration.

In 1986, Robert J. Nemiroff predicted the likelihood of microlensing and calculated basic microlensing induced light curves for several possible lens-source configurations in his 1987 thesis.

In 1991 Mao and Paczyński suggested that microlensing might be used to find binary companions to stars, and in 1992 Gould and Loeb demonstrated that microlensing can be used to detect exoplanets. In 1992, Paczyński founded the Optical Gravitational Lensing Experiment, which began searching for events in the direction of the Galactic bulge. The first two microlensing events in the direction of the Large Magellanic Cloud that might be caused by dark matter were reported in back to back Nature papers by MACHO and EROS in 1993, and in the following years, events continued to be detected. The first two events detected by EROS group later turned out to have different origin than microlensing. During this time, Sun Hong Rhie worked on the theory of exoplanet microlensing for events from the survey. The MACHO collaboration ended in 1999. Their data refuted the hypothesis that 100% of the dark halo comprises MACHOs, but they found a significant unexplained excess of roughly 20% of the halo mass, which might be due to MACHOs or to lenses within the Large Magellanic Cloud itself.

EROS subsequently published even stronger upper limits on MACHOs, and it is currently uncertain as to whether there is any halo microlensing excess that could be due to dark matter at all. The SuperMACHO project currently underway seeks to locate the lenses responsible for MACHO's results.

Despite not solving the dark matter problem, microlensing has been shown to be a useful tool for many applications. Hundreds of microlensing events are detected per year toward the Galactic bulge, where the microlensing optical depth (due to stars in the Galactic disk) is about 20 times greater than through the Galactic halo. In 2007, the OGLE project identified 611 event candidates, and the MOA project (a Japan-New Zealand collaboration) identified 488 (although not all candidates turn out to be microlensing events, and there is a significant overlap between the two projects). In addition to these surveys, follow-up projects are underway to study in detail potentially interesting events in progress, primarily with the aim of detecting extrasolar planets. These include MiNDSTEp, RoboNet, MicroFUN and PLANET.

In September 2020, astronomers using microlensing techniques reported the detection, for the first time, of an earth-mass rogue planet unbounded by any star, and free floating in the Milky Way galaxy.

Microlensing not only magnifies the source but also moves its apparent position. The duration of this is longer than that of the magnification, and can be used to find the mass of the lens. In 2022 it was reported that this technique was used to make the first unambiguous detection of an isolated stellar-mass black hole, using observations by the Hubble Space Telescope stretching over six years, starting in August 2011 shortly after the microlensing event was detected. The black hole has a mass of about 7 times the solar mass and is about 1.6 kiloparsecs (5.2 kly) away, in Sagittarius, while the star is about 6 kiloparsecs (20 kly) away. There are millions of isolated black holes in our galaxy, and being isolated very little radiation is emitted from their surroundings, so they can only be detected by microlensing. The authors expect that many more will be found with future instruments, specifically the Nancy Grace Roman Space Telescope and the Vera C. Rubin Observatory.

== Mathematics ==
The mathematics of microlensing, along with modern notation, are described by Gould and we use his notation in this section, though other authors have used other notation. The Einstein radius, also called the Einstein angle, is the angular radius of the Einstein ring in the event of perfect alignment. It depends on the lens mass M, the distance of the lens d_{L}, and the distance of the source d_{S}:

$\theta_E = \sqrt{\frac{4GM}{c^2} \frac{d_S - d_L}{d_S d_L}}$ (in radians).

For M equal to 60 Jupiter masses, d_{L} = 4000 parsecs, and d_{S} = 8000 parsecs (typical for a Bulge microlensing event), the Einstein radius is 0.00024 arcseconds (angle subtended by 1 au at 4000 parsecs). By comparison, ideal Earth-based observations have angular resolution around 0.4 arcseconds, 1660 times greater. Since $\theta_E$ is so small, it is not generally observed for a typical microlensing event, but it can be observed in some extreme events as described below.

Although there is no clear beginning or end of a microlensing event, by convention the event is said to last while the angular separation between the source and lens is less than $\theta_E$. Thus the event duration is determined by the time it takes the apparent motion of the lens in the sky to cover an angular distance $\theta_E$. The Einstein radius is also the same order of magnitude as the angular separation between the two lensed images, and the astrometric shift of the image positions throughout the course of the microlensing event.

During a microlensing event, the brightness of the source is amplified by an amplification factor A. This factor depends only on the closeness of the alignment between observer, lens, and source. The unitless number u is defined as the angular separation of the lens and the source, divided by $\theta_E$. The amplification factor is given in terms of this value:

$$A(u) = \frac{u^2 + 2}{u \sqrt{u^2 + 4}}.$$

This function has several important properties. A(u) is always greater than 1, so microlensing can only increase the brightness of the source star, not decrease it. A(u) always decreases as u increases, so the closer the alignment, the brighter the source becomes. As u approaches infinity, A(u) approaches 1, so that at wide separations, microlensing has no effect. Finally, as u approaches 0, for a point source A(u) approaches infinity as the images approach an Einstein ring. For perfect alignment (u = 0), A(u) is theoretically infinite. In practice, real-world objects are not point sources, and finite source size effects will set a limit to how large an amplification can occur for very close alignment, but some microlensing events can cause a brightening by a factor of hundreds.

Unlike gravitational macrolensing where the lens is a galaxy or cluster of galaxies, in microlensing u changes significantly in a short period of time. The relevant time scale is called the Einstein time $t_E$, and it's given by the time it takes the lens to traverse an angular distance $\theta_E$ relative to the source in the sky. For typical microlensing events, $t_E$ is on the order of a few days to a few months. The function u(t) is simply determined by the Pythagorean theorem:

$$u(t) = \sqrt{u_{min}^2 + \left ( \frac{t-t_0}{t_E} \right )^2}.$$

The minimum value of u, called u_{min}, determines the peak brightness of the event.

In a typical microlensing event, the light curve is well fit by assuming that the source is a point, the lens is a single point mass, and the lens is moving in a straight line: the point source-point lens approximation. In these events, the only physically significant parameter that can be measured is the Einstein timescale $t_E$. Since this observable is a degenerate function of the lens mass, distance, and velocity, we cannot determine these physical parameters from a single event.

However, in some extreme events, $\theta_E$ may be measurable while other extreme events can probe an additional parameter: the size of the Einstein ring in the plane of the observer, known as the Projected Einstein radius: $\tilde{r}_E$. This parameter describes how the event will appear to be different from two observers at different locations, such as a satellite observer. The projected Einstein radius is related to the physical parameters of the lens and source by

$$\tilde{r}_E = \sqrt{\frac{4GM}{c^2} \frac{d_S d_L}{d_S - d_L}}.$$

It is mathematically convenient to use the inverses of some of these quantities. These are the Einstein proper motion

$$\vec{\mu}_E = {t_E}^{-1}$$

and the Einstein parallax

$$\vec{\pi}_E = {\tilde{r}_E}^{-1}.$$

These vector quantities point in the direction of the relative motion of the lens with respect to the source. Some extreme microlensing events can only constrain one component of these vector quantities. Should these additional parameters be fully measured, the physical parameters of the lens can be solved yielding the lens mass, parallax, and proper motion as

$$M=\frac{c^2}{4G}\theta_E \tilde{r}_E,$$
$$\pi_L=\pi_E\theta_E + \pi_S,$$
$$\mu_L=\mu_E\theta_E + \mu_S.$$

== Extreme microlensing events ==
In a typical microlensing event, the light curve is well fit by assuming that the source is a point, the lens is a single point mass, and the lens is moving in a straight line: the point source-point lens approximation. In these events, the only physically significant parameter that can be measured is the Einstein timescale $t_E$. However, in some cases, events can be analyzed to yield the additional parameters of the Einstein angle and parallax: $\theta_E$ and $\pi_E$. These include very high magnification events, binary lenses, parallax, and xallarap events, and events where the lens is visible.

=== Events yielding the Einstein angle ===
Although the Einstein angle is too small to be directly visible from a ground-based telescope, several techniques have been proposed to observe it.

If the lens passes directly in front of the source star, then the finite size of the source star becomes an important parameter. The source star must be treated as a disk on the sky, not a point, breaking the point-source approximation, and causing a deviation from the traditional microlensing curve that lasts as long as the time for the lens to cross the source, known as a finite source light curve. The length of this deviation can be used to determine the time needed for the lens to cross the disk of the source star $t_S$. If the angular size of the source $\theta_S$ is known, the Einstein angle can be determined as

$$\theta_E = \theta_S \frac{t_E}{t_S}.$$

These measurements are rare, since they require an extreme alignment between source and lens. They are more likely when $\theta_S/\theta_E$ is (relatively) large, i.e., for nearby giant sources with slow-moving low-mass lenses close to the source.

In finite source events, different parts of the source star are magnified at different rates at different times during the event. These events can thus be used to study the limb darkening of the source star.

=== Binary lenses ===
If the lens is a binary star with separation of roughly the Einstein radius, the magnification pattern is more complex than in the single star lenses. In this case, there are typically three images when the lens is distant from the source, but there is a range of alignments where two additional images are created. These alignments are known as caustics. At these alignments, the magnification of the source is formally infinite under the point-source approximation.

Caustic crossings in binary lenses can happen with a wider range of lens geometries than in a single lens. Like a single lens source caustic, it takes a finite time for the source to cross the caustic. If this caustic-crossing time $t_S$ can be measured, and if the angular radius of the source is known, then again the Einstein angle can be determined.

As in the single lens case when the source magnification is formally infinite, caustic crossing binary lenses will magnify different portions of the source star at different times. They can thus probe the structure of the source and its limb darkening.

=== Events yielding the Einstein parallax ===
In principle, the Einstein parallax can be measured by having two observers simultaneously observe the event from different locations, e.g., from the Earth and from a distant spacecraft. The difference in amplification observed by the two observers yields the component of $\vec{\pi}_E$ perpendicular to the motion of the lens while the difference in the time of peak amplification yields the component parallel to the motion of the lens. This direct measurement has been reported using the Spitzer Space Telescope. In extreme cases, the differences may even be measurable from small differences seen from telescopes at different locations on Earth, i.e. terrestrial parallax.

The Einstein parallax can also be measured through orbital parallax; the motion of the observer, caused by the rotation of the Earth about the Sun and the Sun through the Galaxy means that a microlensing event is being observed from different angles at each observation epoch. This was first reported in 1995 and has been reported in a handful of events since. Parallax, in point-lens events, can best be measured for long-timescale events, with a large $\pi_E$, i..e. from slow-moving, low mass lenses, which are close to the observer.

If the source star is a binary star, then it too will have additional relative motion, which can also cause detectable changes in the light curve. This effect is known as Xallarap (parallax spelled backwards).

== Detection of extrasolar planets ==
Gravitational microlensing of an extrasolar planet

If the lensing object is a star with a planet orbiting it, this is an extreme example of a binary lens event. If the source crosses a caustic, the deviations from a standard event can be large even for low mass planets. These deviations allow us to infer the existence and determine the mass and separation of the planet around the lens. Deviations typically last a few hours or a few days. Because the signal is strongest when the event itself is strongest, high-magnification events are the most promising candidates for detailed study. Typically, a survey team notifies the community when they discover a high-magnification event in progress. Follow-up groups then intensively monitor the ongoing event, hoping to get good coverage of the deviation if it occurs. When the event is over, the light curve is compared to theoretical models to find the physical parameters of the system. The parameters that can be determined directly from this comparison are the mass ratio of the planet to the star, and the ratio of the star-planet angular separation to the Einstein angle. From these ratios, along with assumptions about the lens star, the mass of the planet and its orbital distance can be estimated.

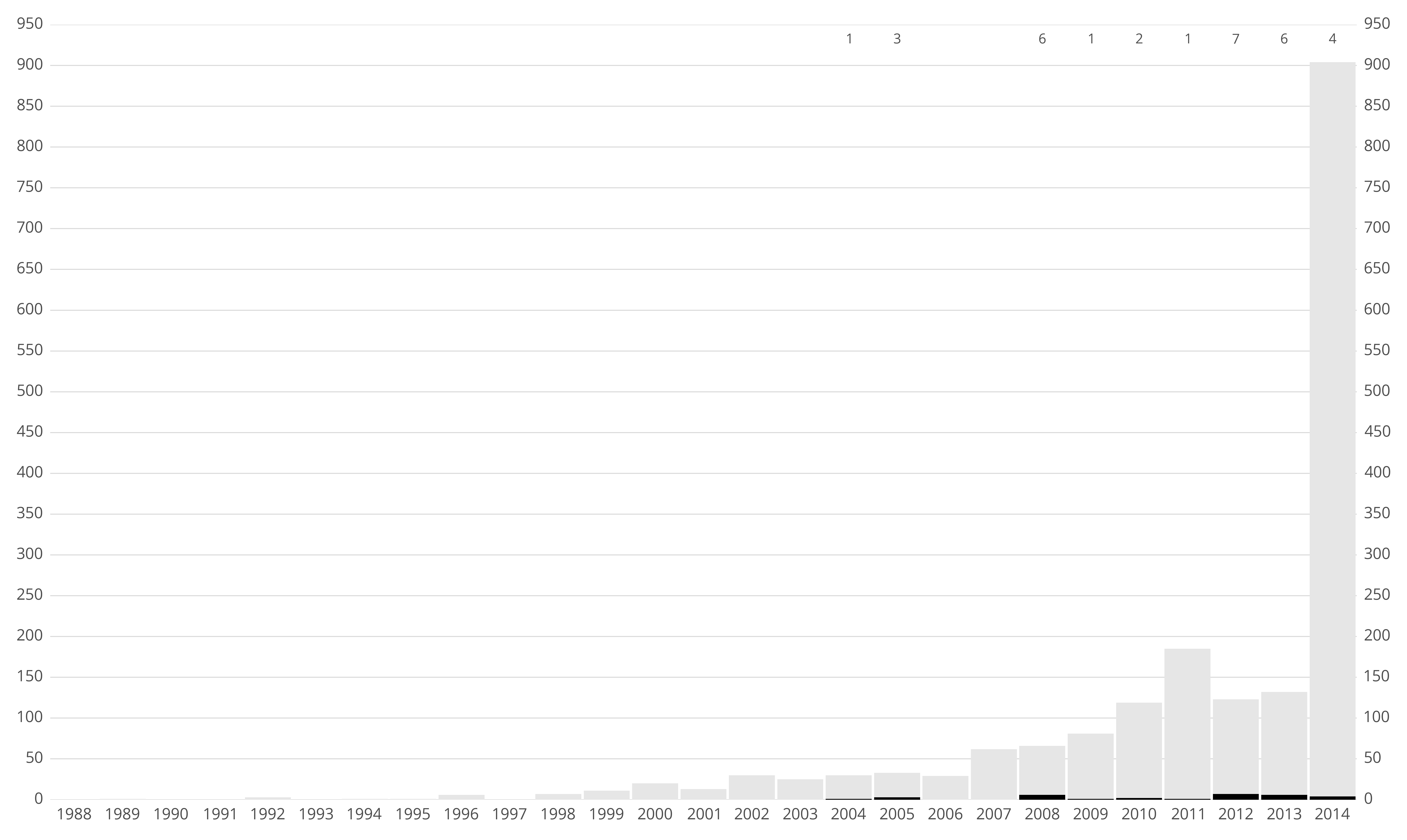
The black bars indicate exoplanets discovered using microlensing, by year, through 2014.

The first success of this technique was made in 2003 by both OGLE and MOA of the microlensing event OGLE 2003–BLG–235 (or MOA 2003–BLG–53). Combining their data, they found the most likely planet mass to be 1.5 times the mass of Jupiter. As of April 2020, 89 exoplanets have been detected by this method. Notable examples include OGLE-2005-BLG-071Lb, OGLE-2005-BLG-390Lb, OGLE-2005-BLG-169Lb, two exoplanets around OGLE-2006-BLG-109L, and MOA-2007-BLG-192Lb. Notably, at the time of its announcement in January 2006, the planet OGLE-2005-BLG-390Lb probably had the lowest mass of any known exoplanet orbiting a regular star, with a median at 5.5 times the mass of the Earth and roughly a factor two uncertainty. This record was contested in 2007 by Gliese 581 c with a minimal mass of 5 Earth masses, and since 2009 Gliese 581 e is the lightest known "regular" exoplanet, with minimum 1.9 Earth masses. In October 2017, OGLE-2016-BLG-1190Lb, an extremely massive exoplanet (or possibly a brown dwarf), about 13.4 times the mass of Jupiter, was reported.

Comparing this method of detecting extrasolar planets with other techniques such as the transit method, one advantage is that the intensity of the planetary deviation does not depend on the planet mass as strongly as effects in other techniques do. This makes microlensing well suited to finding low-mass planets. It also allows detection of planets further away from the host star than most of the other methods. One disadvantage is that followup of the lens system is very difficult after the event has ended, because it takes a long time for the lens and the source to be sufficiently separated to resolve them separately.

A terrestrial atmospheric lens proposed by Yu Wang in 1998 that would use Earth's atmosphere as a large lens could also directly image nearby potentially habitable exoplanets.

== Microlensing experiments ==
There are two basic types of microlensing experiments. "Search" groups use large-field images to find new microlensing events. "Follow-up" groups often coordinate telescopes around the world to provide intensive coverage of select events. The initial experiments all had somewhat risqué names until the formation of the PLANET group. There are current proposals to build new specialized microlensing satellites, or to use other satellites to study microlensing.

=== Search collaborations ===
- Alard; Mao; Guibert (1995). "Object DUO 2: A New Binary Lens Candidate". Astronomy and Astrophysics. 300: L17. arXiv:astro-ph/9506101. Bibcode:1995A&A...300L..17A. Photographic plate search of bulge.
- Experience de Recherche des Objets Sombres (EROS) (1993–2002) Largely French collaboration. EROS1: Photographic plate search of LMC: EROS2: CCD search of LMC, SMC, Bulge & spiral arms.
- MACHO (1993–1999) Australia & US collaboration. CCD search of bulge and LMC.
- Optical Gravitational Lensing Experiment (OGLE) ( 1992 – ), Polish collaboration established by Paczynski and Udalski. Dedicated 1.3m telescope in Chile run by the University of Warsaw. Targets on bulge and Magellanic Clouds.
- Microlensing Observations in Astrophysics (MOA) (1998 – ), Japanese-New Zealand collaboration. Dedicated 1.8m telescope in New Zealand. Targets on bulge and Magellanic Clouds.
- SuperMACHO (2001 – ), successor to the MACHO collaboration used 4 m CTIO telescope to study faint LMC microlenses.

=== Follow-up collaborations ===
- Probing Lensing Anomalies Network (PLANET) Multinational collaboration.
- MicroFUN, Microlensing Follow Up Network
- Microlensing Planet Search (MPS)
- Microlensing Network for the Detection of Small Terrestrial Exoplanets, MiNDSTEp
- RoboNet. Searching for planets using a global network of robotic telescopes

=== Andromeda Galaxy pixel lensing ===
- MEGA
- AGAPE (in French)
- WeCAPP
- The Angstrom Project
- PLAN

=== Proposed satellite experiments ===
- Galactic Exoplanet Survey Telescope (GEST)
- SIM Microlensing Key Project would have used the extremely high precision astrometry of the Space Interferometry Mission satellite to break the microlensing degeneracy and measure the mass, distance, and velocity of lenses. This satellite was postponed several times and finally cancelled in 2010.
- The Nancy Grace Roman Space Telescope, being prepared by NASA for launch in the mid-2020s, will include a microlensing survey along with several other surveys. The microlensing demographics will complement those of the Kepler and TESS missions, with better sensitivity to planets like Earth and Mars that are more likely to be rocky planets in the habitable zone of their suns.

== See also ==
- Gravitational lens
- OGLE-2019-BLG-0960Lb
- Terrestrial atmospheric lens
