= Mary Fraser =

Mary Fraser may refer to:

- Mary Crawford Fraser (1851–1922), American writer
- Mary Isabel Fraser (1863–1942), New Zealand school principal and educationalist
- Mary Fraser Dott (?–c. 1980), Scottish nationalist and political activist
- Mary Fraser Tytler (1849–1938), Indian-born English symbolist craftswoman, designer, and social reformer
- Mary Fraser Wesselhoeft (1873–1971), American artist
