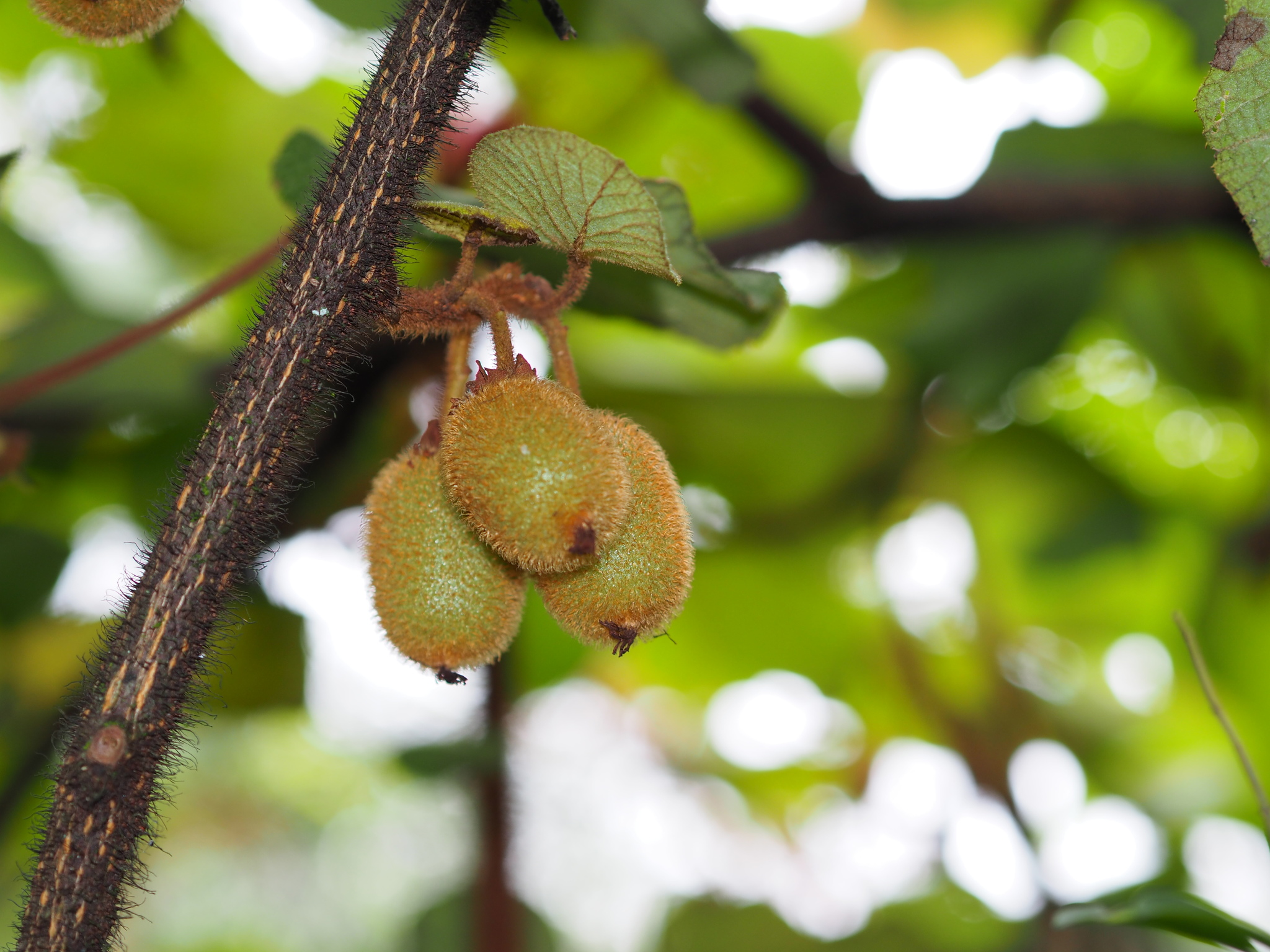

Scientific classification
- Kingdom: Plantae
- Clade: Tracheophytes
- Clade: Angiosperms
- Clade: Eudicots
- Clade: Asterids
- Order: Ericales
- Family: Actinidiaceae
- Genus: Actinidia
- Species: A. chinensis
- Variety: A. c. var. setosa

Trinomial name
- Actinidia chinensis var. setosa H.L.Li

Synonyms
- Actinidia setosa (H.L.Li) C.F.Liang & A.R.Ferguson

= Actinidia chinensis var. setosa =

Species of plant

Actinidia chinensis var. setosa, also known as Taiwanese kiwifruit, is a sub-species of Actinidia chinensis, a flowering plant in the Chinese gooseberry family Actinidiaceae. The taxon is native to Taiwan.

== Taxonomy ==
The taxon was first formally described in 1952 by Hui-lin Li, based on a specimen collected by Ernest Henry Wilson collected in October 1908 from Alishan, Taiwan. Li distinguished Setosa due to its thinner, relatively larger and much narrower leaves, which always had pointed apices, and because specimens of the plants consistently showed coarse hairs on the upper surface of leaves. In 1985 the taxonomy of Actinidia was revised by Chou-Fen Liang and A. R. Ferguson, who raised the taxon to species level, naming it Actinidia setosa. In the 2007 edition of the Flora of China, the taxon name was revised again, returning the preferred binomial nomenclature to Actinidia chinensis var. setosa.

Phylogenetic analysis has shown that Actinidia chinensis var. setosa is more closely related to Actinidia chinensis var. deliciosa than to Actinidia chinensis var. chinensis.

== Habitat ==
The species is a liana, and grows in temperate biomes. The subspecies is endemic to Taiwan. The taxon grows in mountain forests, between a height of 1,300–2,600 m (4,300–8,500 ft) above sea-level.

== Hybridisation ==
The taxon can form hybrid forms with Actinidia chinensis var. deliciosa. While Actinidia chinensis var.chinensis and Actinidia chinensis var. deliciosa form hybrids in the wild due to overlapping ranges in central south China, this does not occur for Actinidia chinensis var. setosa, due to its wild range being restricted to Taiwan.

== Domestication ==
A cultivar of Actinidia chinensis var. setosa called No. 9, collected from Ma Mountain in Taichung County, is being investigated for potential cultivation as a commercial species.

== Gallery ==
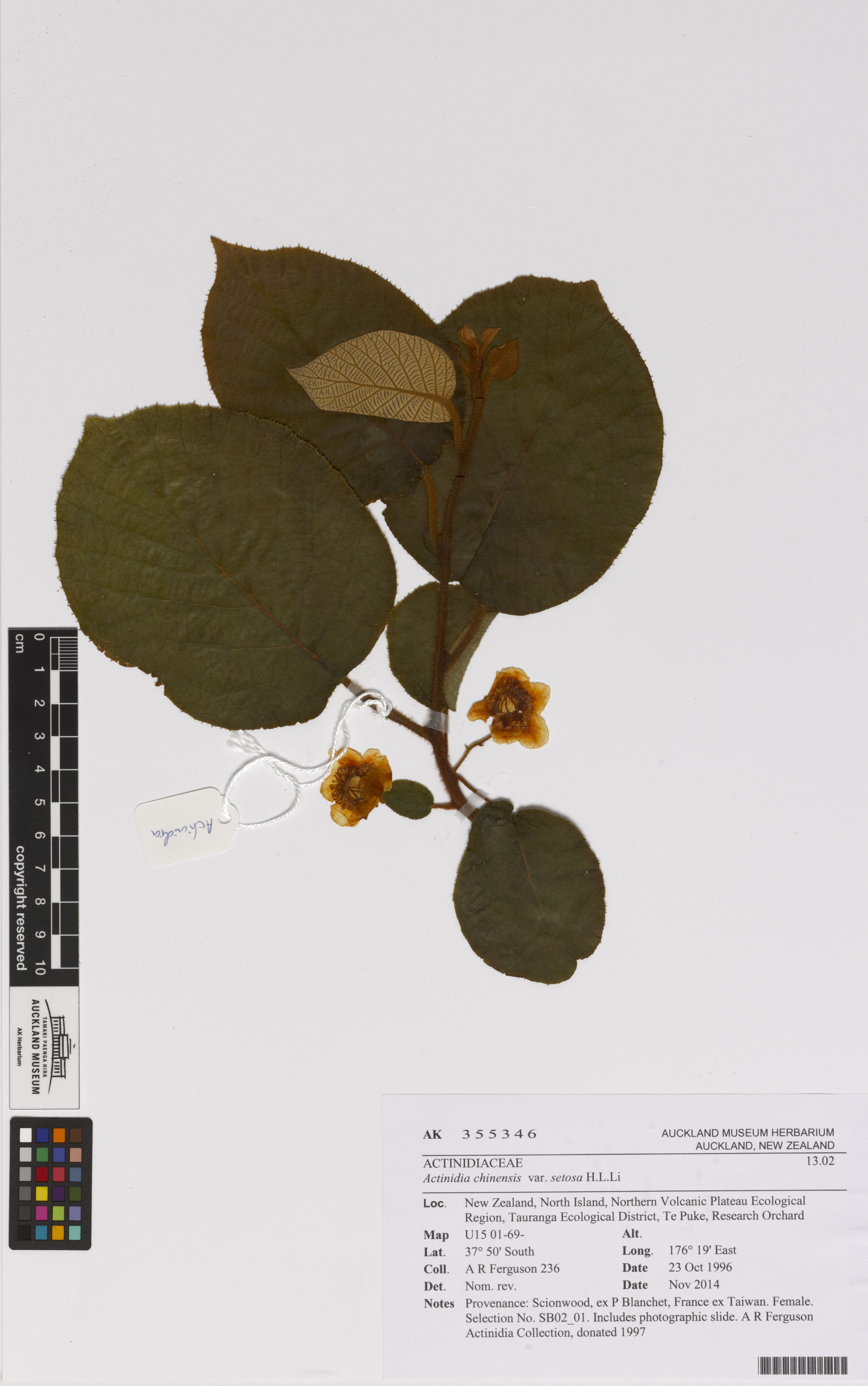
Herbarium specimen of Actinidia chinensis var. setosa

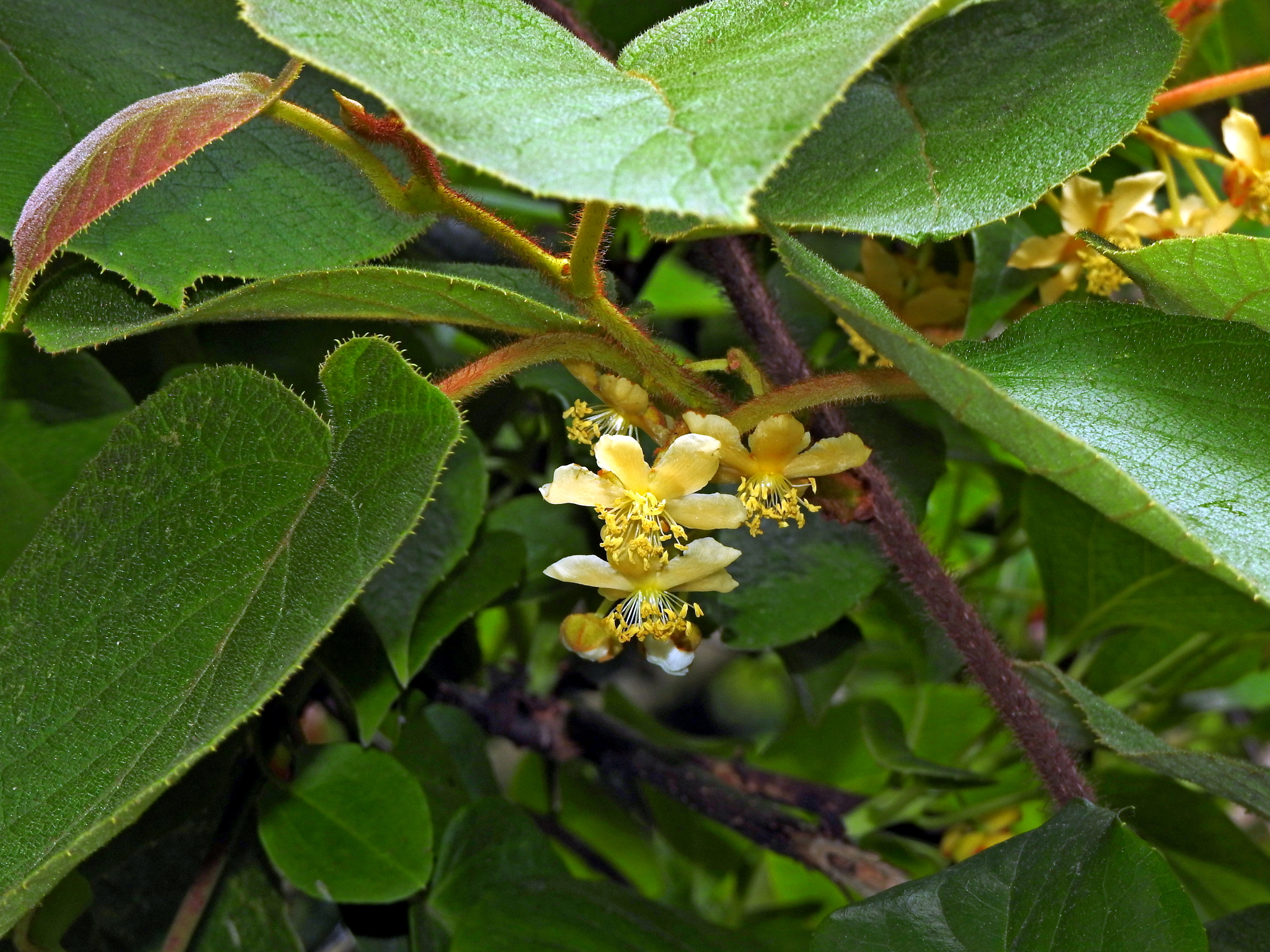
Flowers of Actinidia chinensis var. setosa

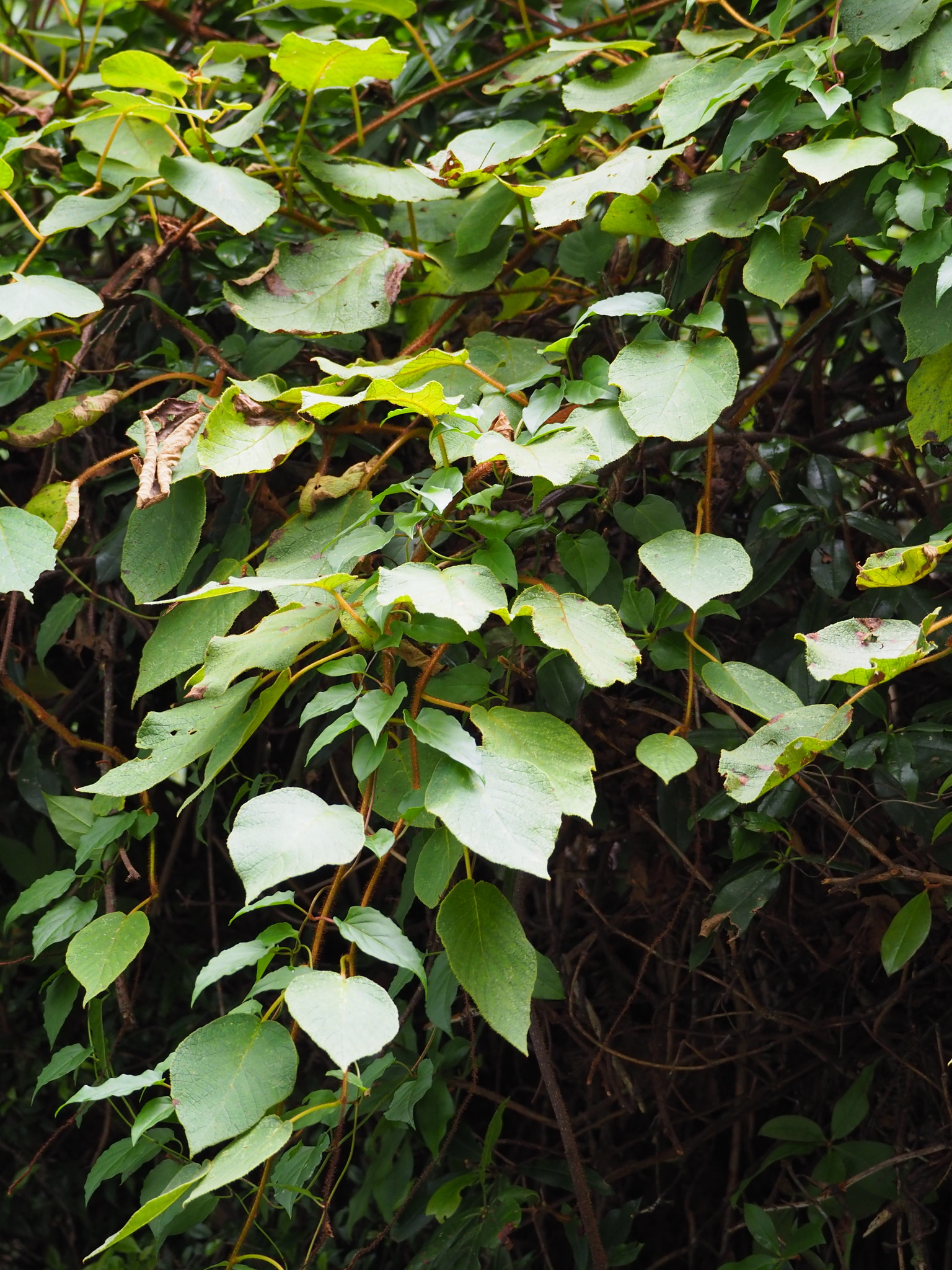
Leaves of Actinidia chinensis var. setosa

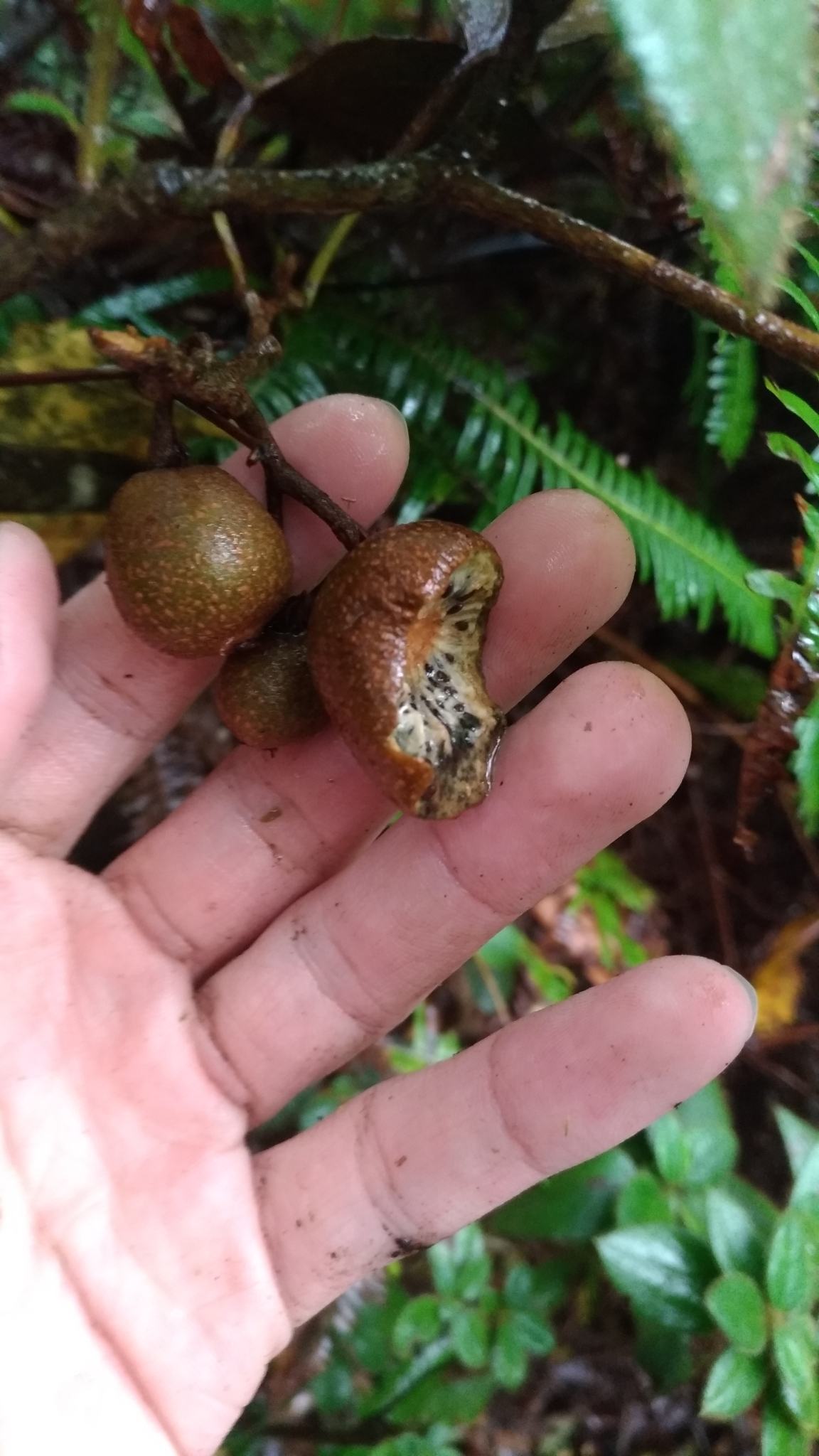
Inside of wild fruit

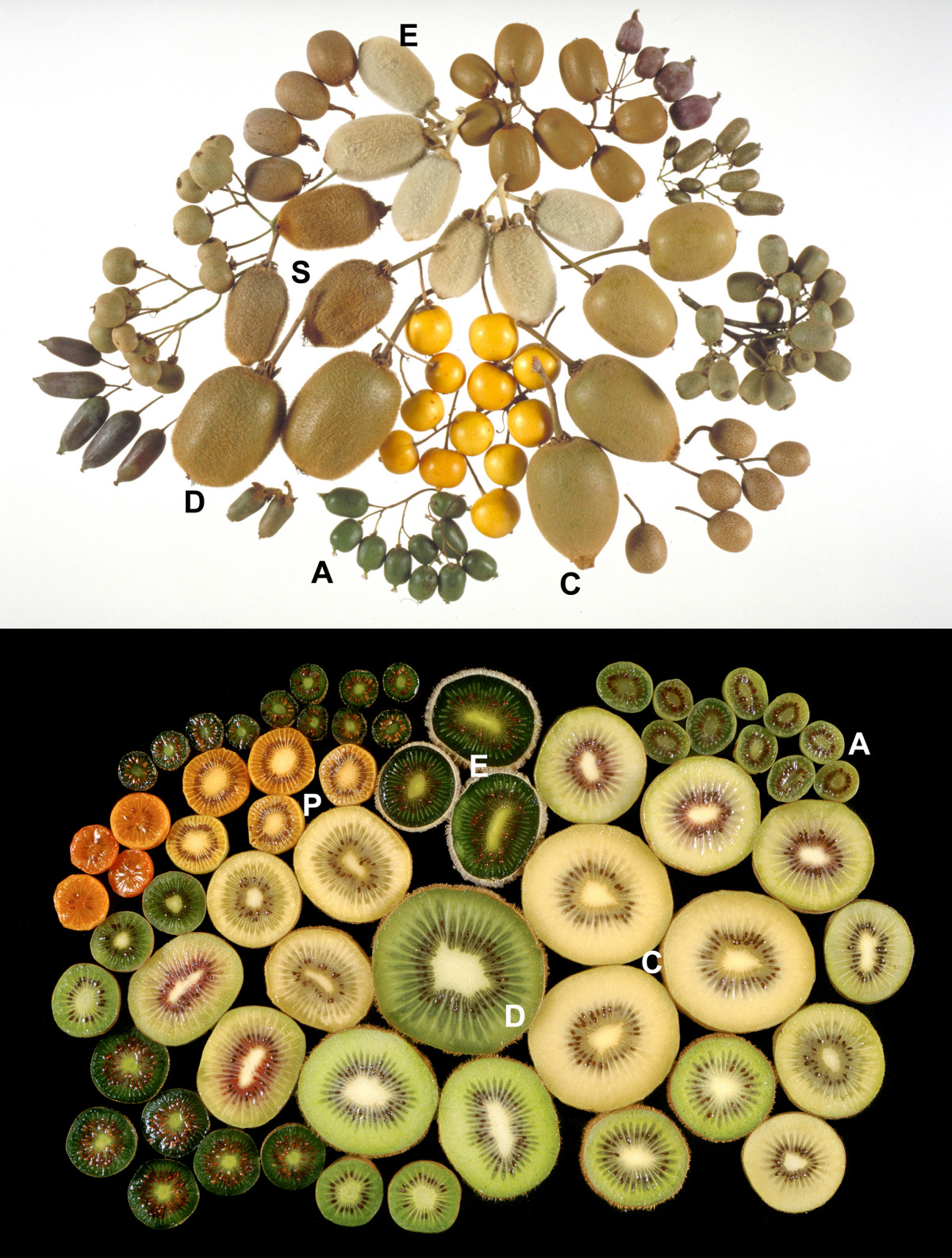
Actinidia chinensis var. setosa (labelled S) in comparison to other kiwifruit species
