= Red kiwifruit =

Cultivar of kiwifruit

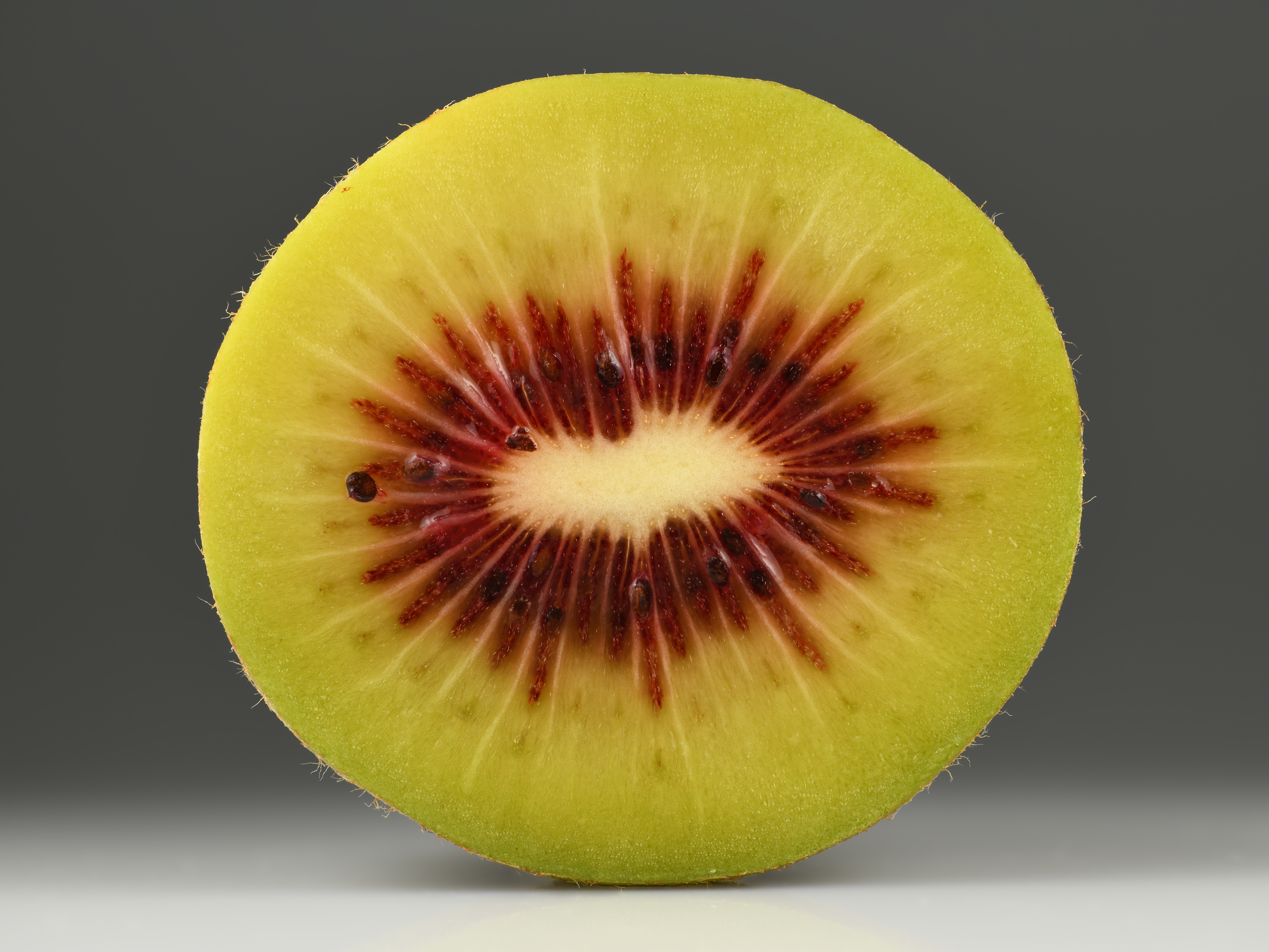
- A cross-section of a 'Red Passion' kiwifruit
- Genus: Actinidia
- Species: Actinidia chinensis var. chinensis
- Marketing names: Donghong, Hongyang, Red Passion, Zespri RubyRed
- Origin: China

Red kiwifruit refers to several kiwifruit cultivars with partial red flesh. Red kiwifruit originate from Actinidia chinensis var. chinensis, which is also the major source for gold kiwifruit varieties. The first varieties were identified in China in the early 1980s, and were given the scientific name Actinidia chinensis var. rufopulpa, which was later synonymised with Actinidia chinensis var. chinensis.

Red kiwifruit are popular in China, where the cultivar Hongyang makes up a significant portion of the kiwifruit market, and as of 2020 is the most planted variety of kiwifruit in China. Other major varieties include Red Passion, developed in Italy, and Zespri RubyRed, developed in New Zealand.

== Characteristics ==
The red kiwifruit is a variety of Actinidia chinensis var. chinensis and is distinguished by its red-coloured flesh, restricted to the inner pericarp of the fruit. The red colour is caused by the pigment anthocyanin. Red kiwifruit have a similar taste and sweetness to gold kiwifruit, with an additional slight berry flavour.

== History ==
=== Development ===
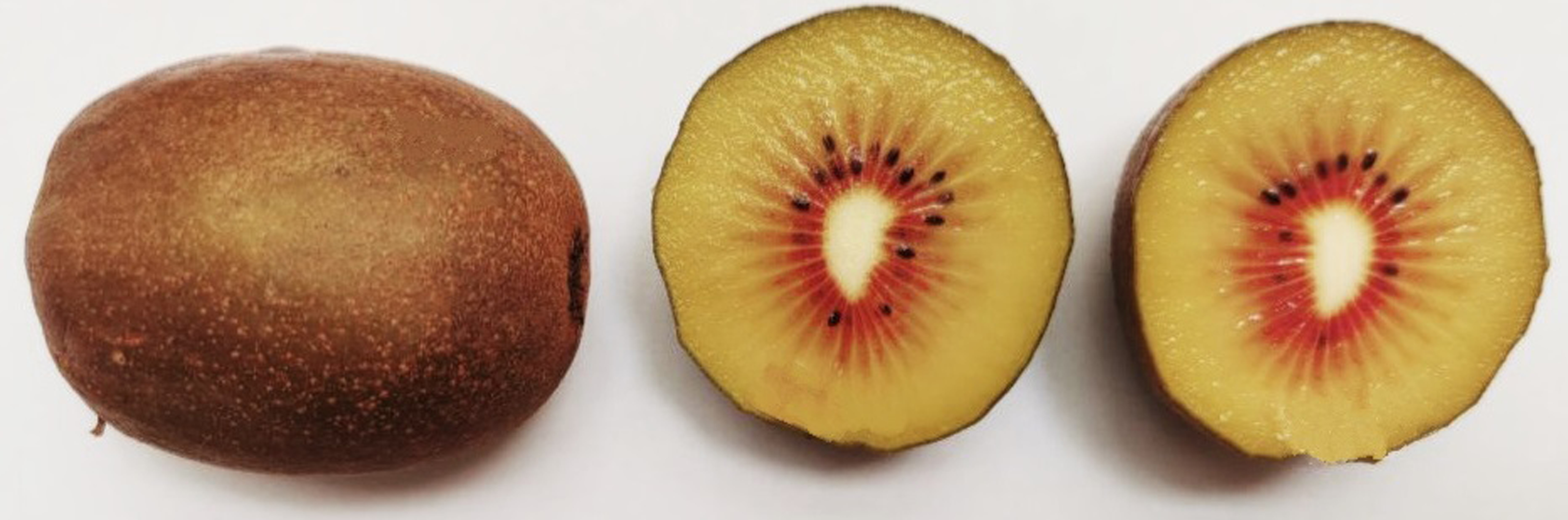
Hongyang variety red kiwifruit, the first commercially available cultivar from China

Actinidia chinensis is a plant native to mountainous areas of central China, including the modern provinces of Hunan and Hubei. While never formally cultivated, fruit of Actinidia chinensis were often harvested from the wild and sold at markets in China. During the early-to-mid 20th century, a market developed in New Zealand for a closely related green-fleshed species, Actinidia chinensis var. deliciosa, then known to New Zealanders as Chinese gooseberries. By 1959, cultivars that had developed in New Zealand were being marketed as kiwifruit. In the 1970s, Chinese horticulturists began surveying wild germplasm of Actinidia species growing in mountainous central China, in order to develop cultivars which could compete with the popularity of New Zealand kiwifruit cultivars.

In 1982, the first reports of red pulp in kiwifruit were made in Actinidia chinensis var. chinensis fruit in Hubei Province, China, and later from Henan and other parts of China. These discoveries led to the classification of the red-fleshed variant as A. chinensis var. rufopulpa (meaning "red pulp"), with distinctions being made based on the length of the fruit stalk, smaller fruit size, and the red inner pericarp of the fruit flesh. This natural mutation set the stage for the development of the Hongyang variety, China's first commercially viable red kiwifruit cultivar.

Hongyang was developed from seeds collected in 1982 from wild Actinidia chinensis plants by the Sichuan Provincial Natural Resources Institute and the Agricultural Bureau of Cangxi County, Sichuan. The seeds were sown in 1984, and by 1986, 921 plants had produced their first fruit. In 1990, a plant was selected from these clonal populations and designated as "Red Sun No. 1." Following field trials and evaluation, the variety was officially registered as Hongyang by the Sichuan Provincial Crop Variety Registration Authority in 1997. It also paved the way for development of later red kiwifruit varieties, including Donghong, which by 2023 was the second most widely cultivated red-fleshed kiwifruits in China. Developed through a collaboration between Italian company, Jingold and Wuhan Botanical Garden in 2012, the Donghong variety is also marketed under the name Oriental Red.

Gold and red kiwifruit varieties greatly grew in popularity in China in the 2000s. By 2002, almost half of kiwifruit plantings in the country were for gold and red Actinidia chinensis var. chinensis varieties, of which two-thirds of plantings were for red kiwifruit. By 2020, Hongyang became the most grown kiwifruit cultivar in China across all types and varieties.

In New Zealand, an independent development of a red kiwifruit variety took place through a partnership between Plant & Food Research and Zespri. The Zespri RubyRed variety resulted from a natural breeding cross in 2007. Initially labeled Zes008, the variety underwent further testing and was soft-launched as "Zespri Red" in select markets between 2019 and 2020. It was rebranded as Zespri RubyRed in 2022. The variety is now grown in New Zealand and exported to Japan, China, and Singapore, with plans for global expansion. Zespri had been working on a different cultivar in the early 2010s, but trials were halted due to this variety being impacted by Pseudomonas syringae pv. actinidiae. By 2019, Zespri were growing 36 red cultivars.

Turners & Growers, a New Zealand company and competitor to Zespri, developed a commercially viable variety of red-ringed kiwifruit patented as EnzaRed, which is a cultivar of the Chinese Hongyang variety.

== Cultivars ==
| Common name | Image | Origin | First developed and introduced | Notes |
|---|---|---|---|---|
| Donghong | | China | | |
| EnzaRed | | New Zealand | | |
| Hongyang | | China | 1982 | Also known as Red Sun No. 1 |
| Red Passion | | Italy | | |
| Redvita | | South Korea | | |
| Zespri RubyRed | | New Zealand | 2007 | Also known as Zes008 and Zespri Red |
