= Anju, Suining =

Anju 安居区
- District
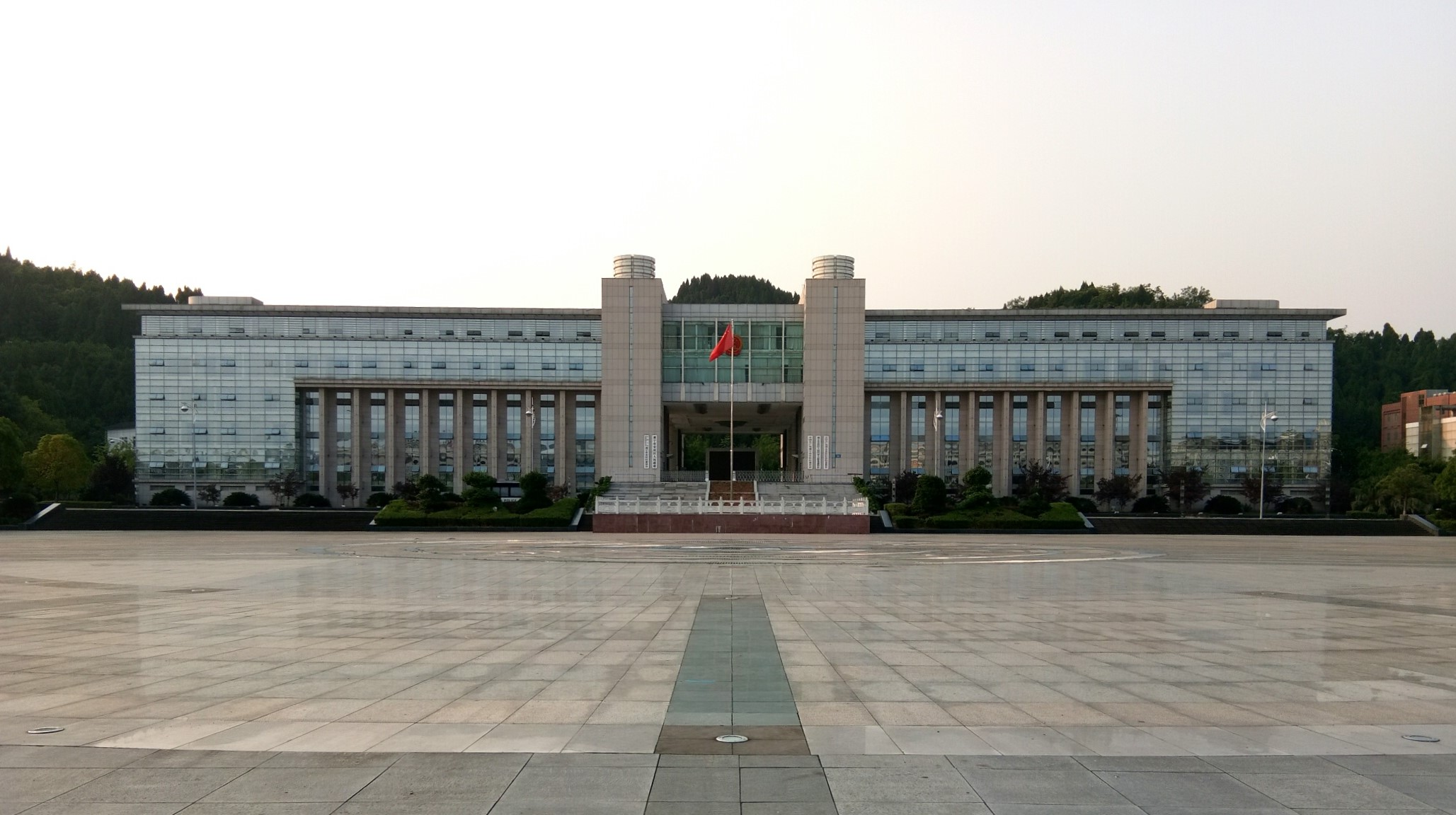
- Anju city hall

- Location in Sichuan
- Coordinates: 30.32495°N 105.43484°E
- Country: China
- Province: Sichuan
- Prefecture-level city: Suining

Area
  - Total: 1,258 km^{2} (486 sq mi)
- Elevation: 282 m (925 ft)

Population (2020 census)
  - Total: 431,310
  - Density: 342.9/km^{2} (888.0/sq mi)
- Time zone: UTC+8 (China Standard)
- Website: www.scanju.gov.cn

Anju (Chinese: 安居; pinyin: Ānjū) is a district of Suining, Sichuan province, People's Republic of China. It had a population of 431,310 in 2020. It was established in 2003 when the Shizhong District of Suining was split into Chuanshan District and Anju District. The district government is located 23 km from the urban area of Suining.

Anju is noted for pomelo cultivation, lotus root, red kiwifruit and Green peppercorns.

== Administrative divisions ==
Anju District comprises 2 subdistricts and 16 towns:

subdistricts

- Rougang 柔刚街道
- Fenghuang 凤凰街道

towns

- Anju 安居镇
- Dongchan 东禅镇
- Fenshui 分水镇
- Shidong 石洞镇
- Lanjiang 拦江镇
- Baoshi 保石镇
- Baima 白马镇
- Zhongxing 中兴镇
- Hengshan 横山镇
- Huilong 会龙镇
- Sanjia 三家镇
- Yufeng 玉丰镇
- Ximei 西眉镇
- Moxi 磨溪镇
- Juxian 聚贤镇
- Changli 常理镇
