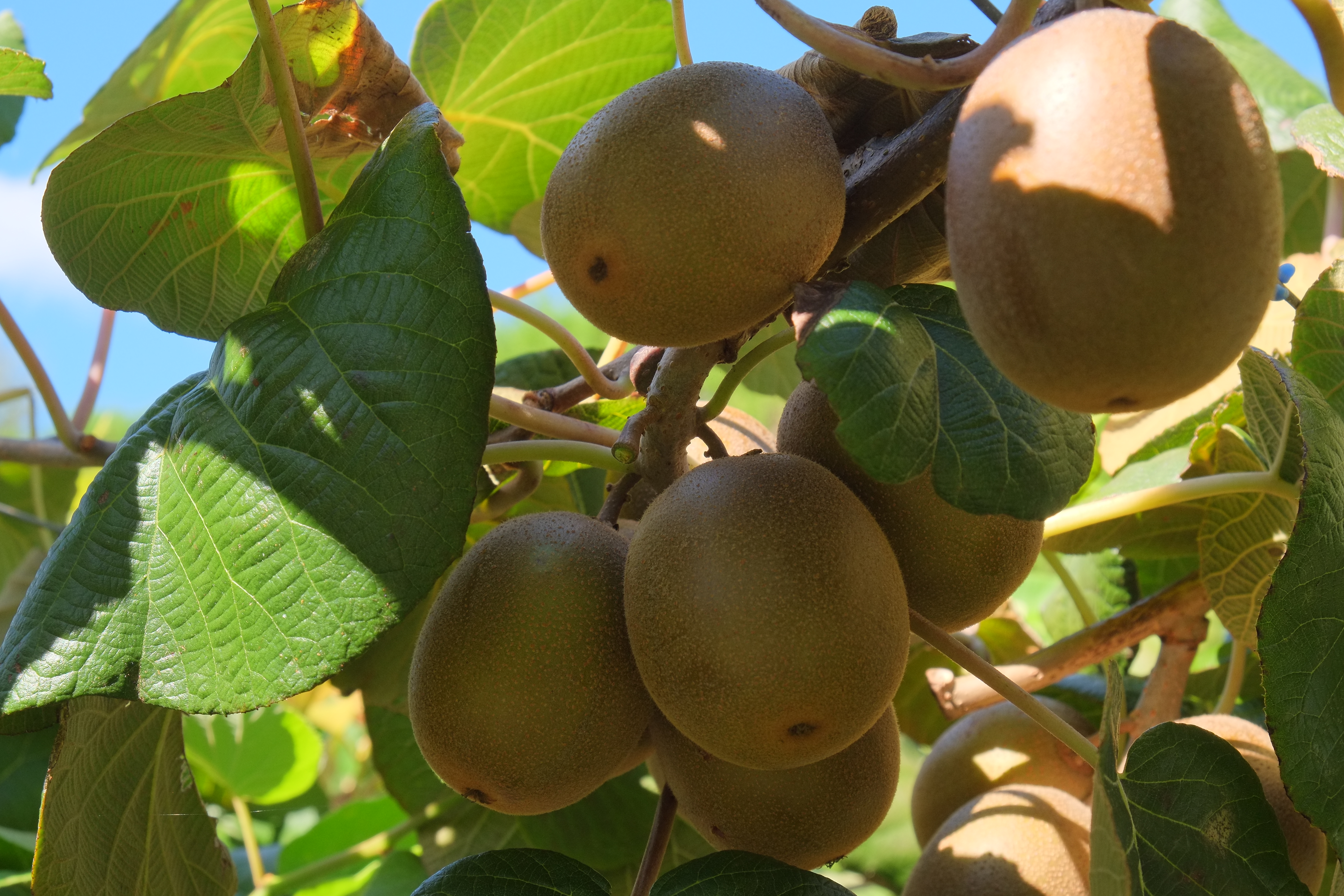
- Fruit of Actinidia chinensis var. chinensis
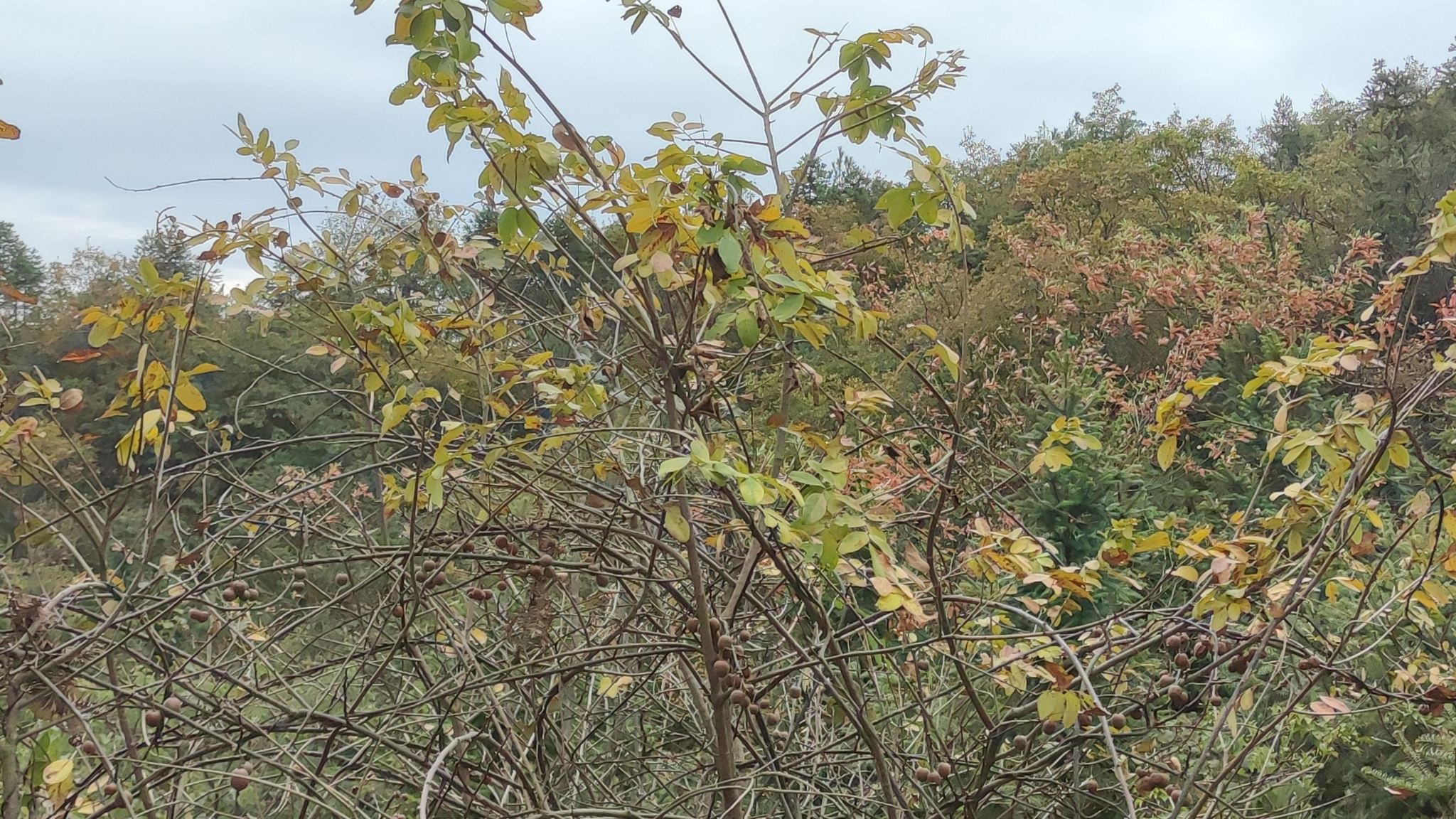
- Wild Actinidia chinensis foliage

Scientific classification
- Kingdom: Plantae
- Clade: Tracheophytes
- Clade: Angiosperms
- Clade: Eudicots
- Clade: Asterids
- Order: Ericales
- Family: Actinidiaceae
- Genus: Actinidia
- Species: A. chinensis

Binomial name
- Actinidia chinensis Planch.

Varieties
- Actinidia chinensis var. chinensis; Actinidia chinensis var. deliciosa (A.Chev.) A.Chev.; Actinidia chinensis var. setosa H.L.Li

= Actinidia chinensis =

Species of plant

Actinidia chinensis is a fruiting vine native to China. It is one of some 40 related species of the genus Actinidia, and the origin of most commercial varieties of kiwifruit.

There are three accepted varieties of the species. Actinidia chinensis var. deliciosa, a form which grows primarily in southwestern China that has hairier fruit, was brought to New Zealand in 1904. Varieties which were developed from these plants are the origin of the major green kiwifruit varieties. Actinidia chinensis var. chinensis is a variety which has smoother skin, and typically grows in southeastern China. Fruit from this variety were developed into gold kiwifruit and red kiwifruit cultivar in the late 20th and early 21st century, including Zespri Gold, Zespri SunGold, Jintao, Hongyang and Donghong. The third variety, Actinidia chinensis var. setosa, grows exclusively in Taiwan.

== Taxonomy ==
The taxon was first formally described in 1857 by French botanist Jules Émile Planchon, who used plants collected by Robert Fortune, who was sent to China by the Horticultural Society of London to collect plants in the aftermath of the First Opium War. Fortune's specimen was likely collected around the year 1845. The type specimen is held at the Royal Botanic Gardens, Kew.

The first recognised variety of Actinidia chinensis was Actinidia chinensis var. deliciosa, described in 1940 by Auguste Chevalier. Chevalier originally considered the variety to be a type of Actinidia latifolia, but revised this to Actinidia chinensis in 1941. The second, Actinidia chinensis var. setosa, or the Taiwanese kiwifruit, was identified in 1952 by Hui-lin Li. Other varieties have been proposed which have since been synonymised with Actinidia chinensis var.chinensis, including Actinidia chinensis var. jinggangshanensis, Actinidia chinensis var. lageniformis, Actinidia chinensis var. latifolia, Actinidia chinensis var. nephrocarpa, Actinidia chinensis var. rufopulpa and Actinidia multipetaloides.

Phylogenetic analysis has shown that Actinidia chinensis var. setosa and Actinidia chinensis var. deliciosa are more closely related to each other than to Actinidia chinensis var. chinensis.

== Description ==
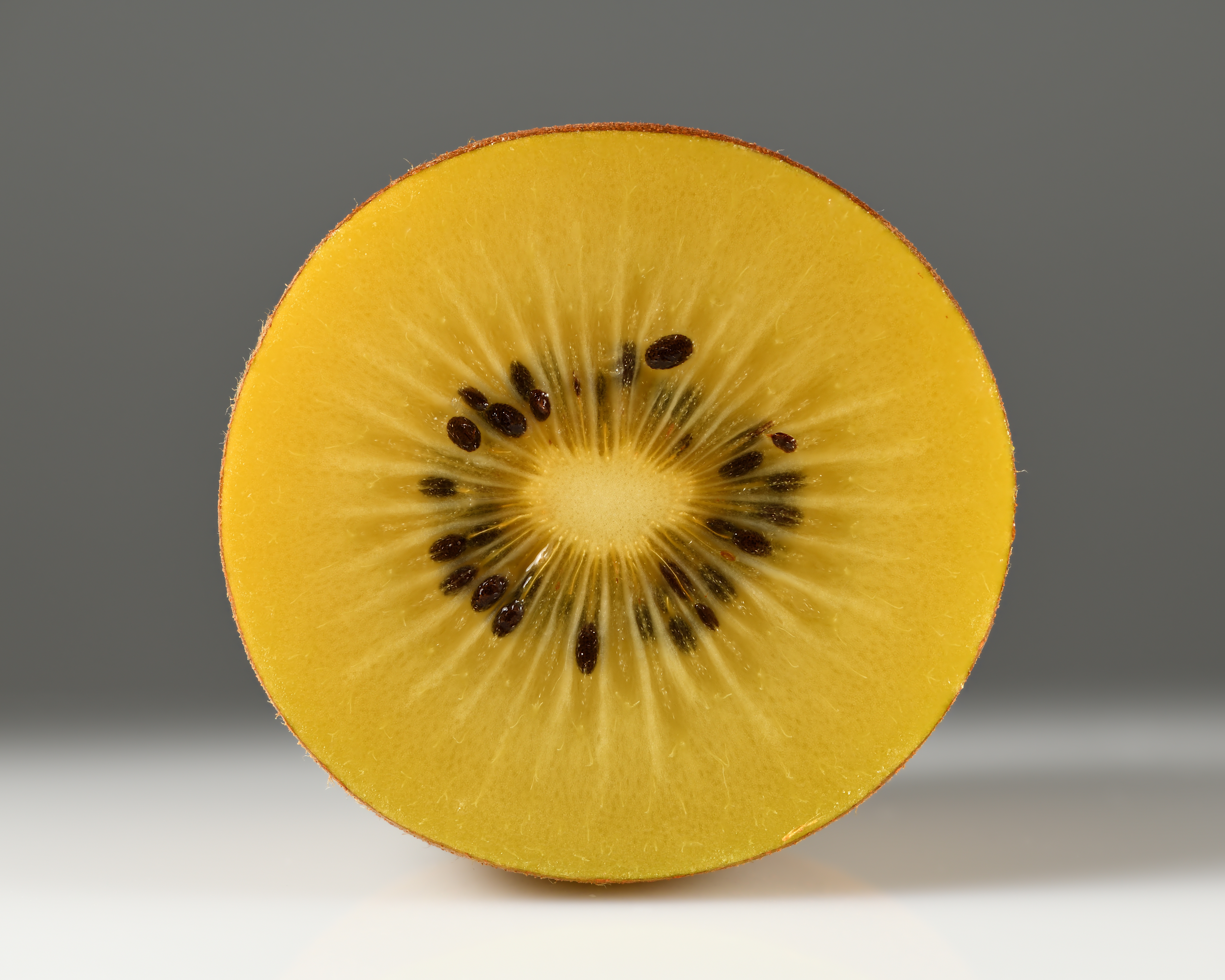
Cross-section of a gold kiwifruit

Actinidia chinensis has a smooth, bronze skin, with a beak shape at the stem attachment. Flesh colour varies from bright green to a clear, intense yellow. This species is sweeter and more aromatic in flavour compared to A. deliciosa, similar to some subtropical fruits. One of the most attractive varieties has a red 'iris' around the centre of the fruit and yellow flesh outside. The yellow fruit obtains a higher market price and, being less hairy than the fuzzy kiwifruit, is more palatable for consumption without peeling. A commercially viable variety of this red-ringed kiwifruit, patented as EnzaRed, is a cultivar of the Chinese hong yang variety. Fruit colour may vary from green to lime green or gold, depending on breeding.

'Hort16A' is a golden kiwifruit cultivar marketed worldwide as Zespri Gold, This cultivar suffered significant losses in New Zealand from late 2010 to 2013 due to the PSA bacterium. A new cultivar of golden kiwifruit, 'Zesy002', was found to be more disease-resistant and most growers changed to this cultivar, with its worldwide demand continuing into 2019. This cultivar is marketed as Zespri SunGold.

== Habitat ==
In its native habitat, Actinidia chinensis grows in thickets, thick (oak) forests (e.g. Quercus aquifolioides, Quercus oxyodon, Quercus lamellosa), and light secondary forests and bushland. A. chinensis prefers slopes and likes also to grow in ravines, top heights of 200–230 m (660–750 ft), relative to the local microclimate. In Western gardens it may range 10 m (30 ft) in all directions, making it unsuitable for all but the largest spaces unless pruned back hard at the end of every growing season.

== Range ==
Actinidia chinensis is found in southern China and Taiwan. Actinidia chinensis var. deliciosa grows in inland forested areas of southwestern China, while Actinidia chinensis var. chinensis typically grows in warmer coastal provinces of southeastern China. The two varieties have overlapping ranges in southeastern Shaanxi, southwestern Henan, western Hubei and Hunan, where intermediate forms can be found. Actinidia chinensis var. setosa is endemic to Taiwan.

== Varieties ==
Three varieties are accepted.

- Actinidia chinensis var. chinensis – central and southern China
- Actinidia chinensis var. deliciosa (A.Chev.) A.Chev. – central and southern China
- Actinidia chinensis var. setosa H.L.Li – Taiwan

== History ==
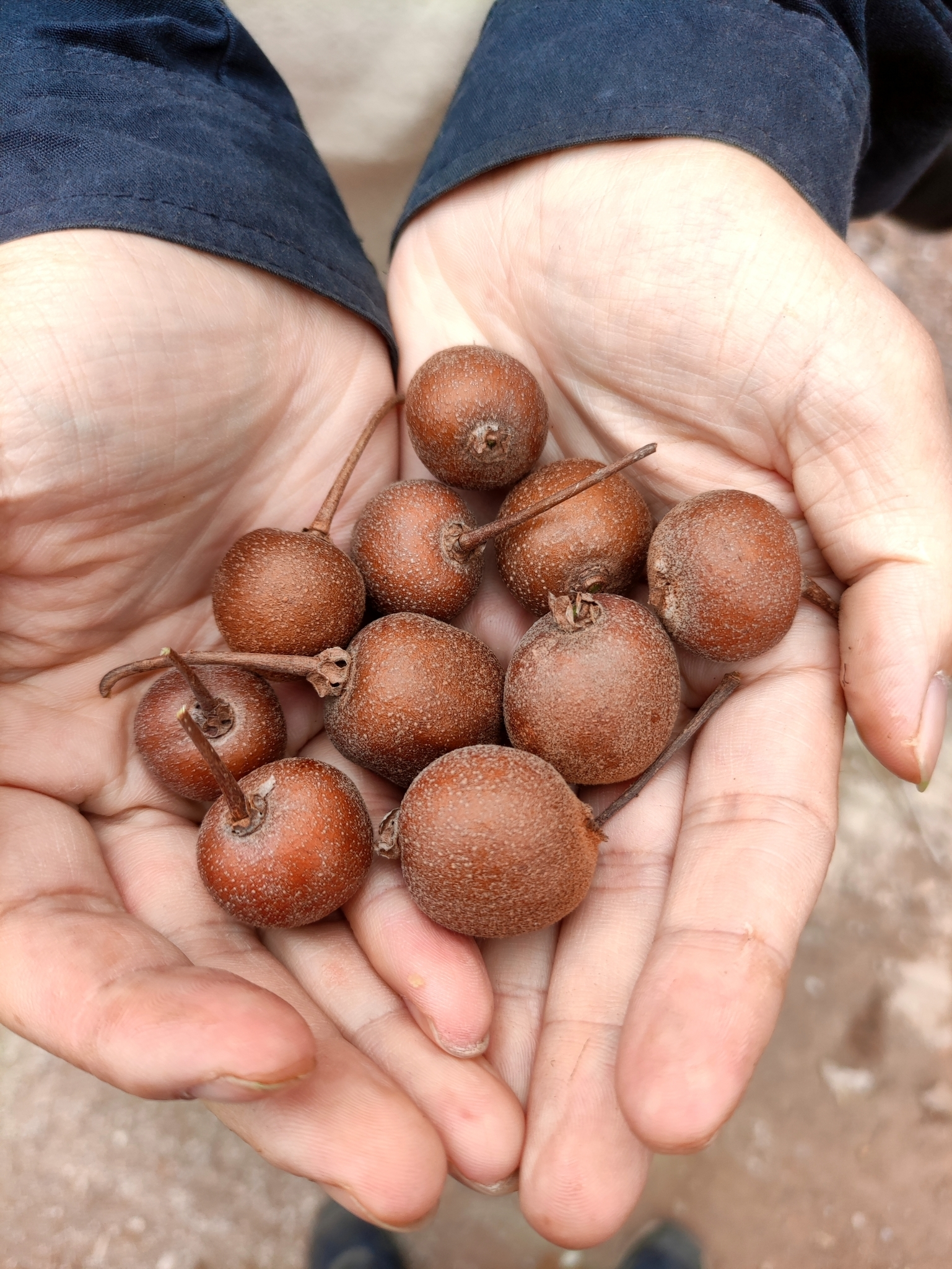
Wild Actinidia chinensis growing in Zhejiang Province

Traditional Chinese names for the fruit include míhóutáo (Chinese: 獼猴桃; trans. "macaque peach"), húlítáo (Chinese: 狐狸桃; trans. "fox peach"), ténglí (Chinese: 藤梨; trans. "vine pear") and yángtáo (Chinese: 羊桃; trans. "sheep peach"), however no traditional distinction existed between Actinidia chinensis and Actinidia deliciosa, with míhóutáo and yángtáo being names used to refer to both varieties. The first known references to Actinidia plants in China date to the Tang dynasty in the 800s, when sporadic attempts were made to cultivate the fruit. This includes a Tang Dynasty poem written by Cen Shen, set in Shaanxi, which describes a plant growing above a well; suggesting that the plant may have been cultivated in gardens during this period. In the Běncǎo Yǎnyì (Chinese: 本草衍義), a 12th century medicinal compendium by Kou Zongshi, describes the plant as growing along pathways deep in the mountains of China, and notes that monkeys eat the fruit. Míhóutáo, including Actinidia deliciosa, were traditionally seen as a wild plant, and were often collected and sold at markets in central Chinese provinces.

The first European botanist to see a specimen of the plant was Pierre Nicolas d'Incarville, who visited the Imperial Court at Beijing between 1740 and 1757. One of the specimens that d'Incarville sent back to Paris was of a yang-tao collected from Macao, however these specimens were not described when they reached Paris, and only analysed almost 150 years later. Charles Maries, collecting for Messrs Veitch noted it in Japan, but the introduction to Western horticulture was from E.H. Wilson, who sent seeds collected in Hubei to Veitch in 1900.

Cultivation of Actinidia chinensis var. deliciosa began in New Zealand in the early 20th century after Mary Isabel Fraser, the principal of Whanganui Girls' College, brought seeds of the plant back to New Zealand. Over time, numerous cultivars were developed by different growers, all originating from the same plant material that was brought to New Zealand by Fraser. By the 1950s, the fruit began to be exported overseas, and by 1959 the name kiwifruit was adopted.

In 1957, the China National Botanical Garden sourced wild Actinidia chinensis var. deliciosa seeds from the Qinling mountains of Shaanxi, growing the first specimens in a botanical institute in China. By 1974, Chinese horticulturists began surveying wild germplasm of Actinidia species growing in mountainous central China, looking to develop cultivars which could compete with the popularity of New Zealand kiwifruit cultivars. These surveys revealed the potential for golden and red Actinidia chinensis var. chinensis varieties to become cultivated commercial crops. In the late 1990s, New Zealand kiwifruit exporters Zespri began to market a gold kiwifruit cultivar grown from Actinidia chinensis var. chinensis.

== Gallery ==
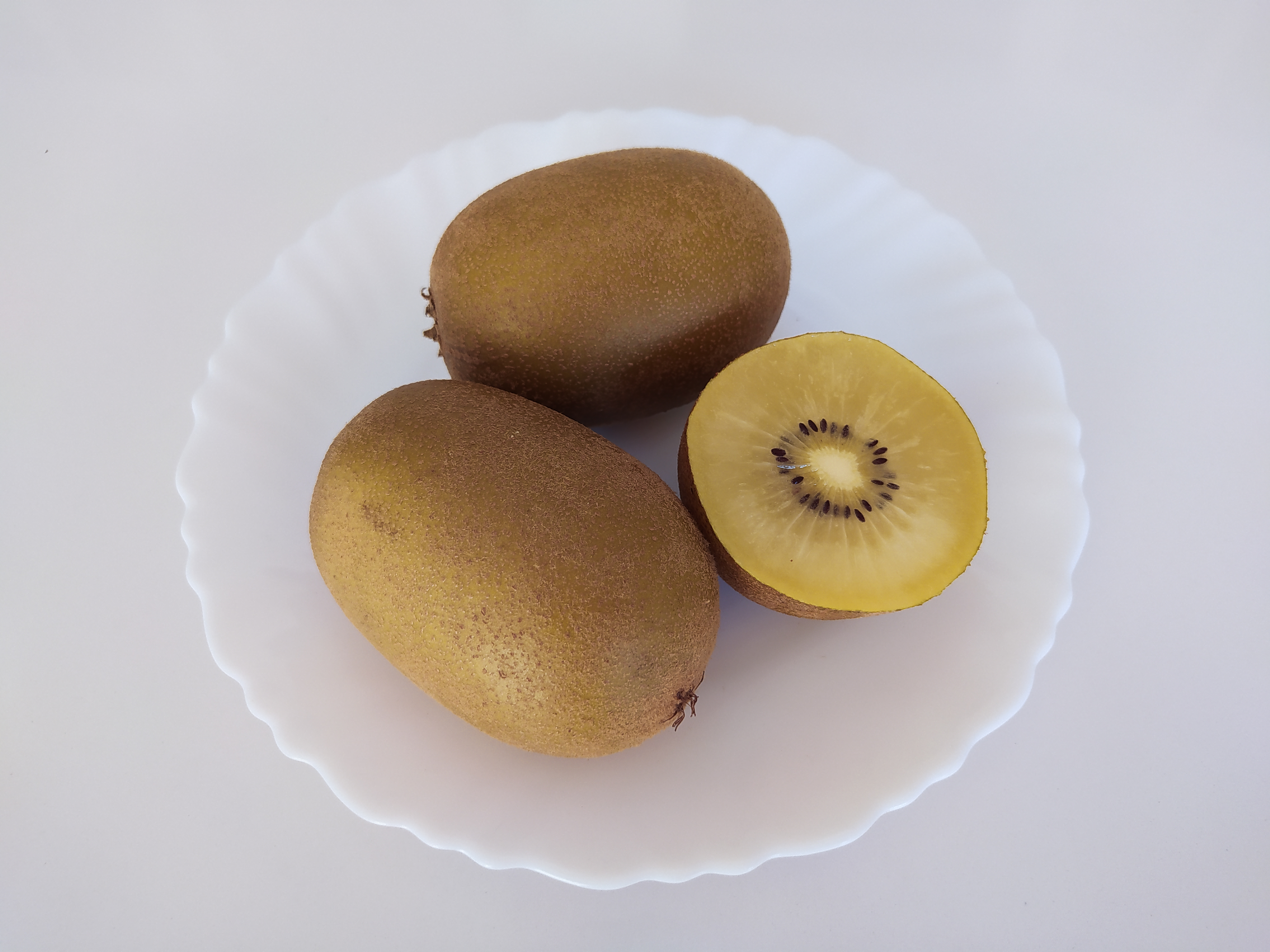
Actinidia chinensis var. chinensis gold kiwifruit variety

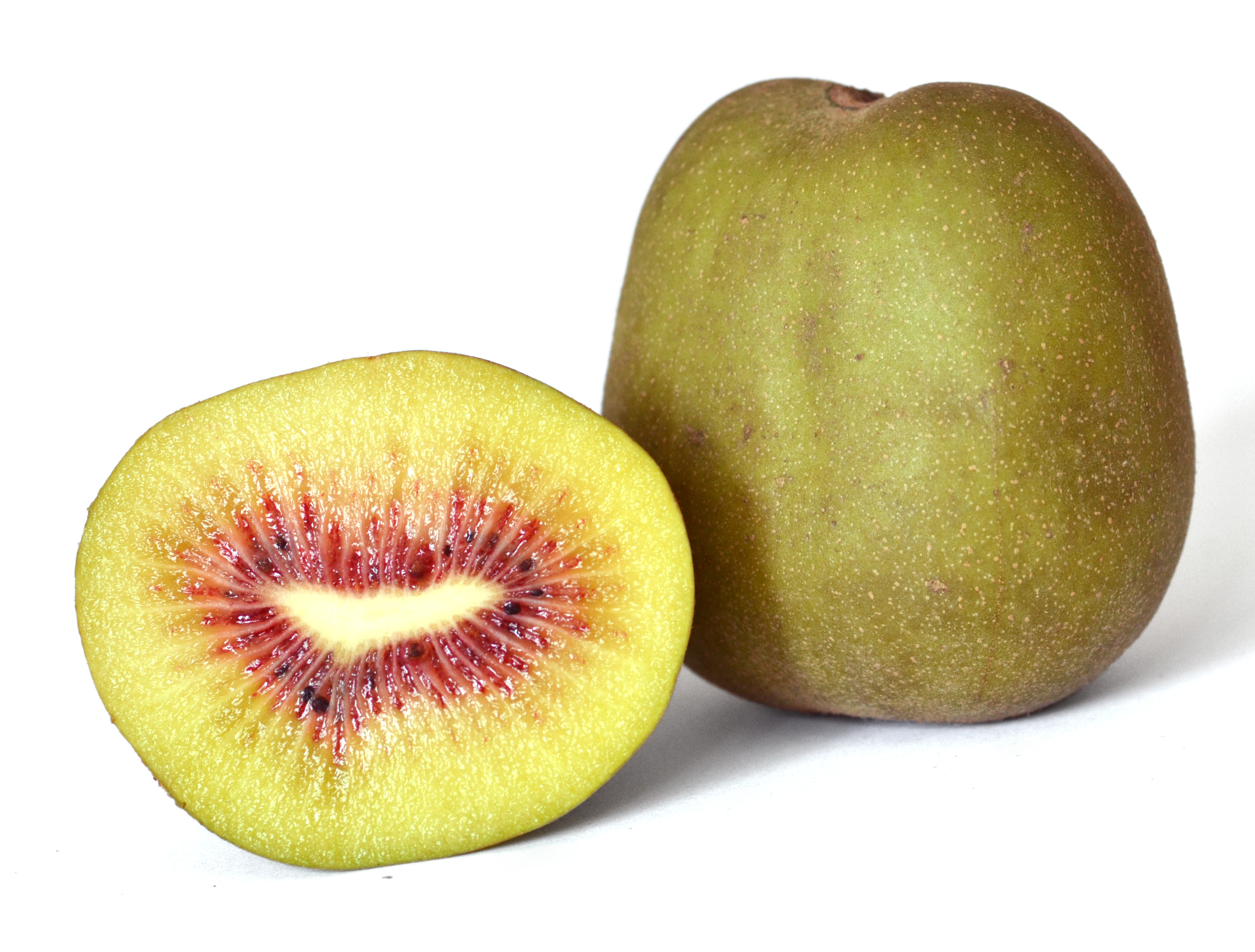
Actinidia chinensis var. chinensis red kiwifruit variety

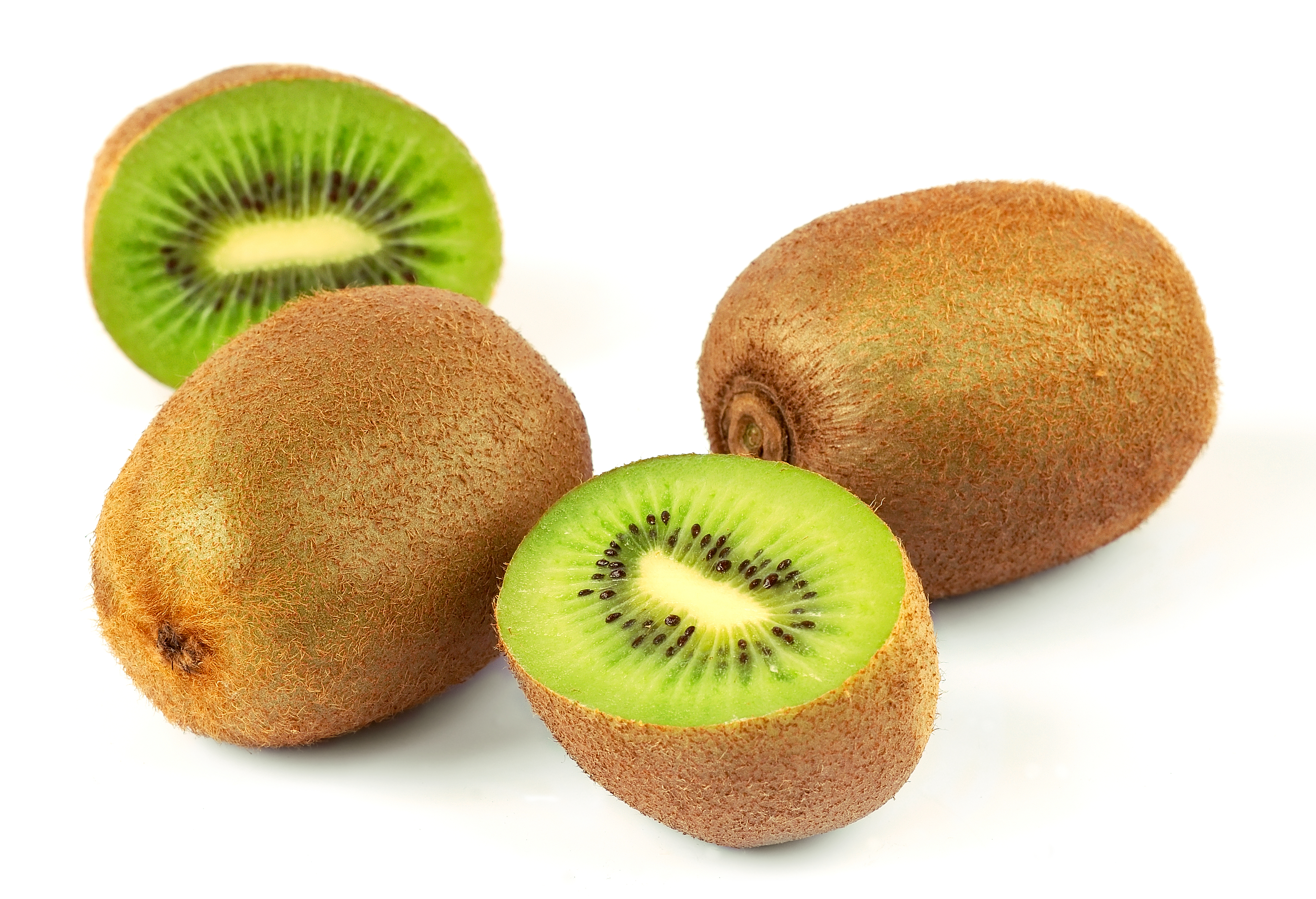
Actinidia chinensis var. deliciosa green variety

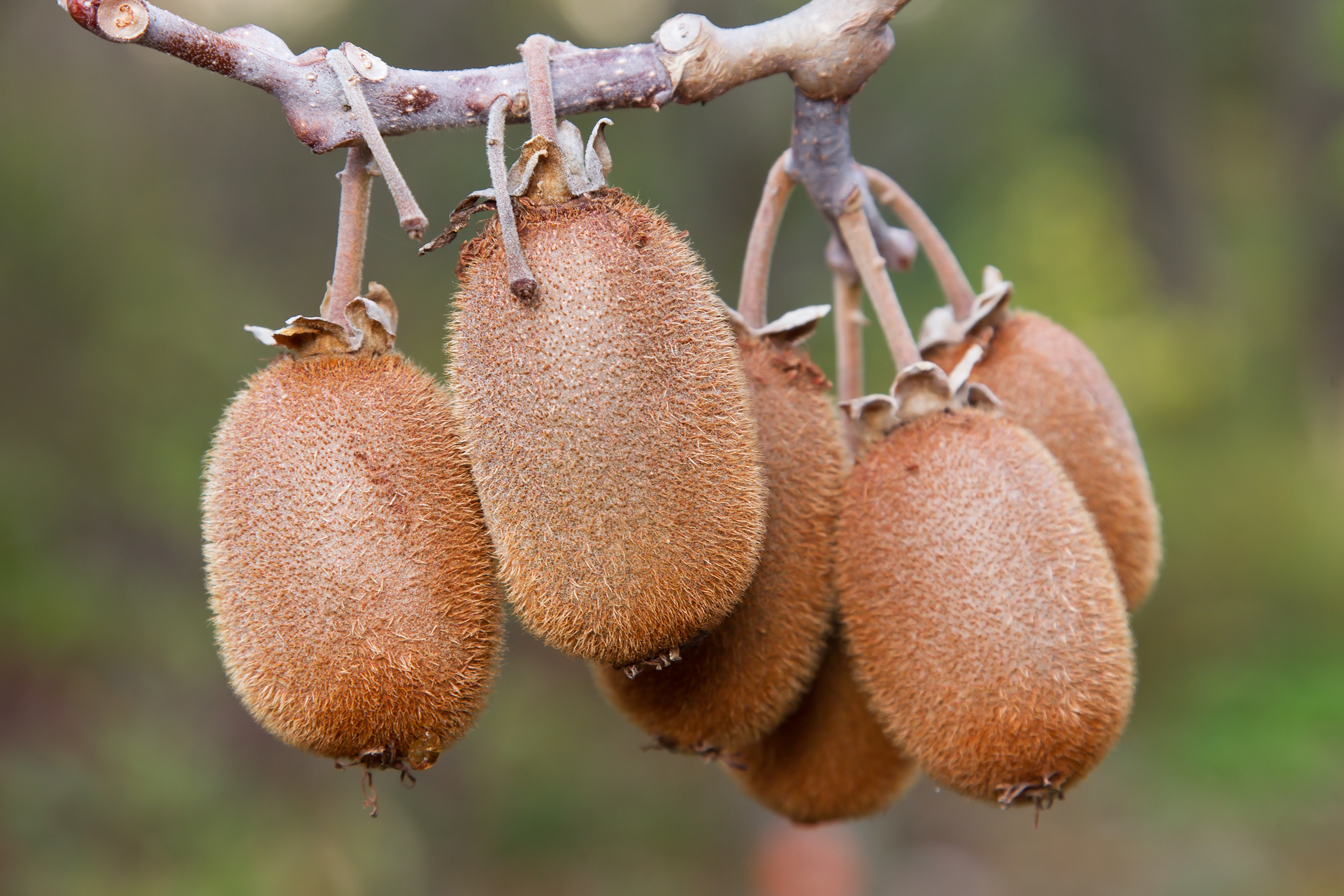
Actinidia chinensis var. deliciosa fruit growing on vines

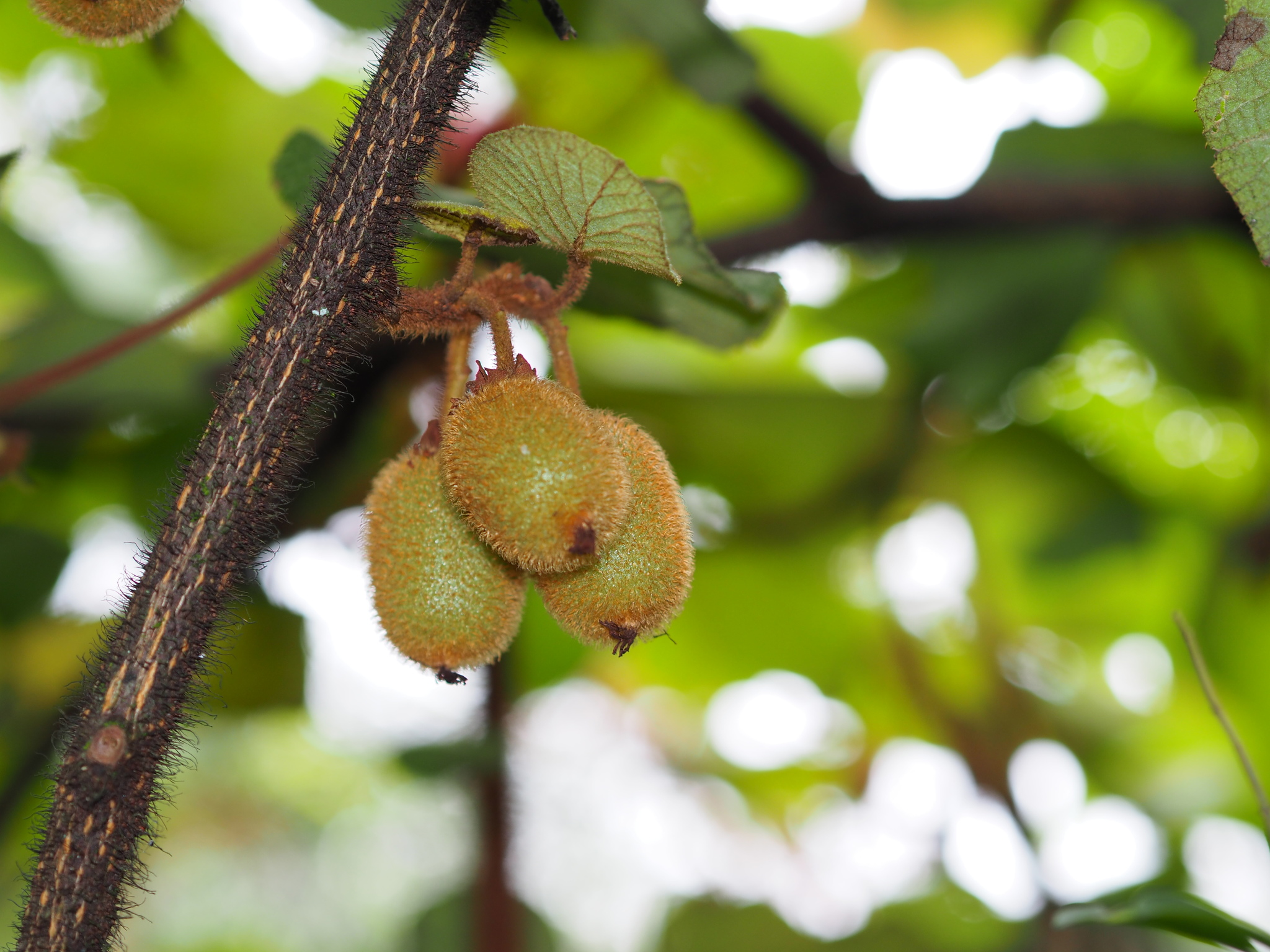
Wild Actinidia chinensis var. setosa fruit

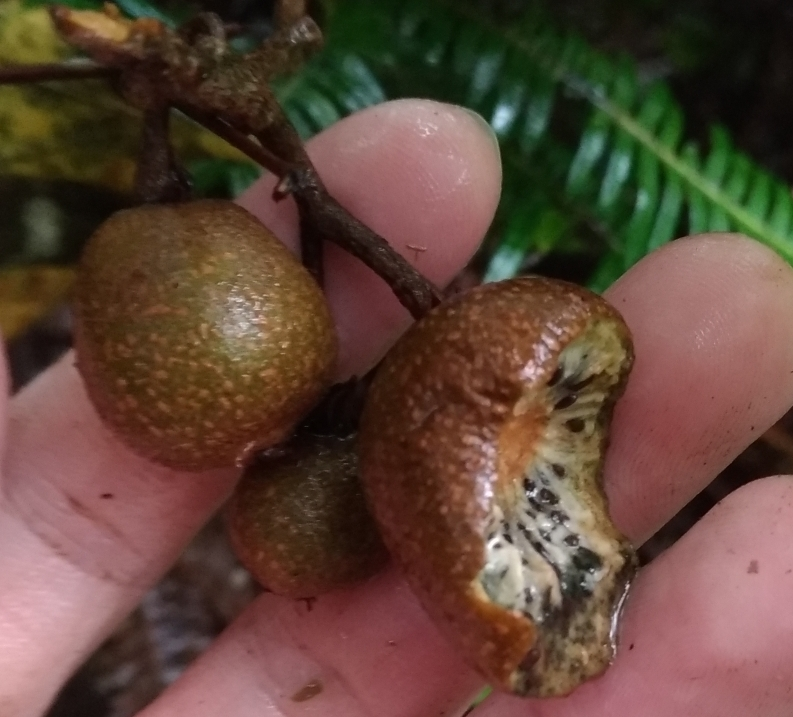
Wild Actinidia chinensis var. setosa fruit

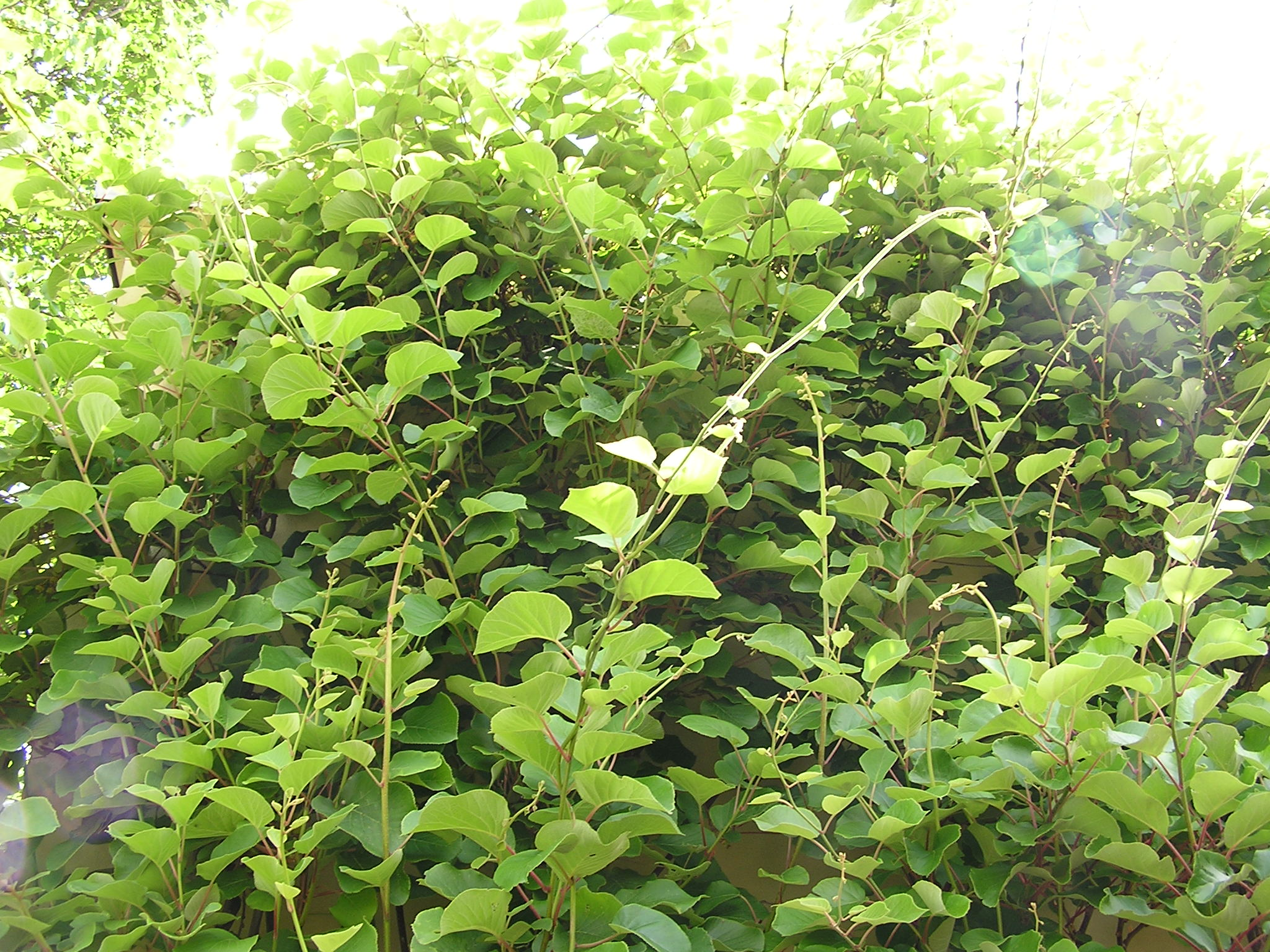
Foliage
