= Ross Ferguson =

New Zealand botanist

Ross Ferguson ONZM
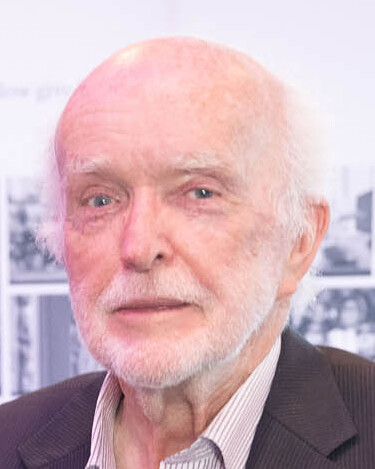
- Ferguson in 2024
- Born: Allan Ross Ferguson; 1943 (age 82–83); Morrinsville, New Zealand
- Education: University of Auckland
- Known for: Contributions in kiwifruit scientific investigation
- Scientific career
- Fields: Botany, biology
- Thesis: Physiological and Biochemical Adaptation in the Nitrogen Nutrition of Spirodela Oligorrhiza (1969)
- Author abbrev. (botany): A.R.Ferguson

Allan Ross Ferguson ONZM (born 1943) is a New Zealand botanist who has made significant contributions in the field of kiwifruit scientific investigation. The standard author abbreviation A.R.Ferguson is used to indicate this person as the author when citing a botanical name.

== Biography ==
Born in Morrinsville and educated at Gisborne Boys' High School, Ferguson studied botany at the Victoria University of Wellington, during which he took part in the Fruitgrowers' Federation Studentship in the Fruit Research Division of the Department of Scientific and Industrial Research at Mount Albert, Auckland. The laboratory work experience led Ferguson to being employed by the DSIR, which he joined in January 1965. During his first three years at the DSIR, Ferguson studied at the University of Auckland, studying the nitrogen metabolism of Spirodela oligorrhiza. In 1967, he received a Masters of Science (first-class honours) from the University of Auckland, followed by a Doctor of Philosophy in cell biology in 1969.

Working at the DSIR for much of his career, Ferguson worked on understanding nitrogen nutrition in plants, and by the early 1970s, was asked by the former division director Ted Bollard to take over the kiwifruit planting fertiliser trial operations in the Bay of Plenty. Ferguson became a major researcher for the burgeoning kiwifruit industry in New Zealand. In the late 1981, Ferguson took part in one of the first science delegations to the People's Republic of China, where he met Chou-Fen Liang, the leading Actinidia taxonomist in China. Ferguson and Liang worked together in 1983 to write a taxonomic revision of the genus Actinidia.

== Honours ==
Ferguson was elected a fellow of the Royal New Zealand Institute of Horticulture in 1990, became a fellow of the New Zealand Society for Horticultural Science in 1992, and in 1995 was awarded a Leonard Cockayne Lecture Award. Ferguson was elected as a Royal Society of New Zealand fellow in 2000, and in the 2007 Queen's Birthday Honours, Ferguson was appointed an Officer of the New Zealand Order of Merit, for services to the kiwifruit industry. At the 2010 Research Honours, Ferguson won the Jubilee Medal, in recognition for his contributions to scientific knowledge of kiwifruit and contributions to the kiwifruit breeding programme of New Zealand.

== Selected publications ==
- Ferguson, A.R. (1984) Kiwifruit: A Botanical Review, in Horticultural Reviews, Volume 6 (ed J. Janick), John Wiley & Sons, Inc., Hoboken, NJ, USA. doi:10.1002/9781118060797.ch1
- Ferguson, A.R. and Bollard, E.G. (1990) Domestication of kiwifruit. In: IJ Warrington IJ & Weston GC, eds. Kiwifruit: Science and Management. Wellington, New Zealand: New Zealand Society for Horticultural Science, 165–246.
- Ferguson, A.R. (2004) 1904– the year that kiwifruit (Actinidia deliciosa) came to New Zealand. New Zealand Journal of Crop and Horticultural Science 32: 3–27. doi:10.1080/01140671.2004.9514276
- Huang, H.-W. and Ferguson, A.R. (2007). Actinidia IN China: Natural diversity, phylogeographical evolution, interspecific gene flow and kiwifruit cultivar improvement. Acta Hortic. 753, 31–40. doi:10.17660/ActaHortic.2007.753.1
