= Gold kiwifruit =

Cultivar of kiwifruit

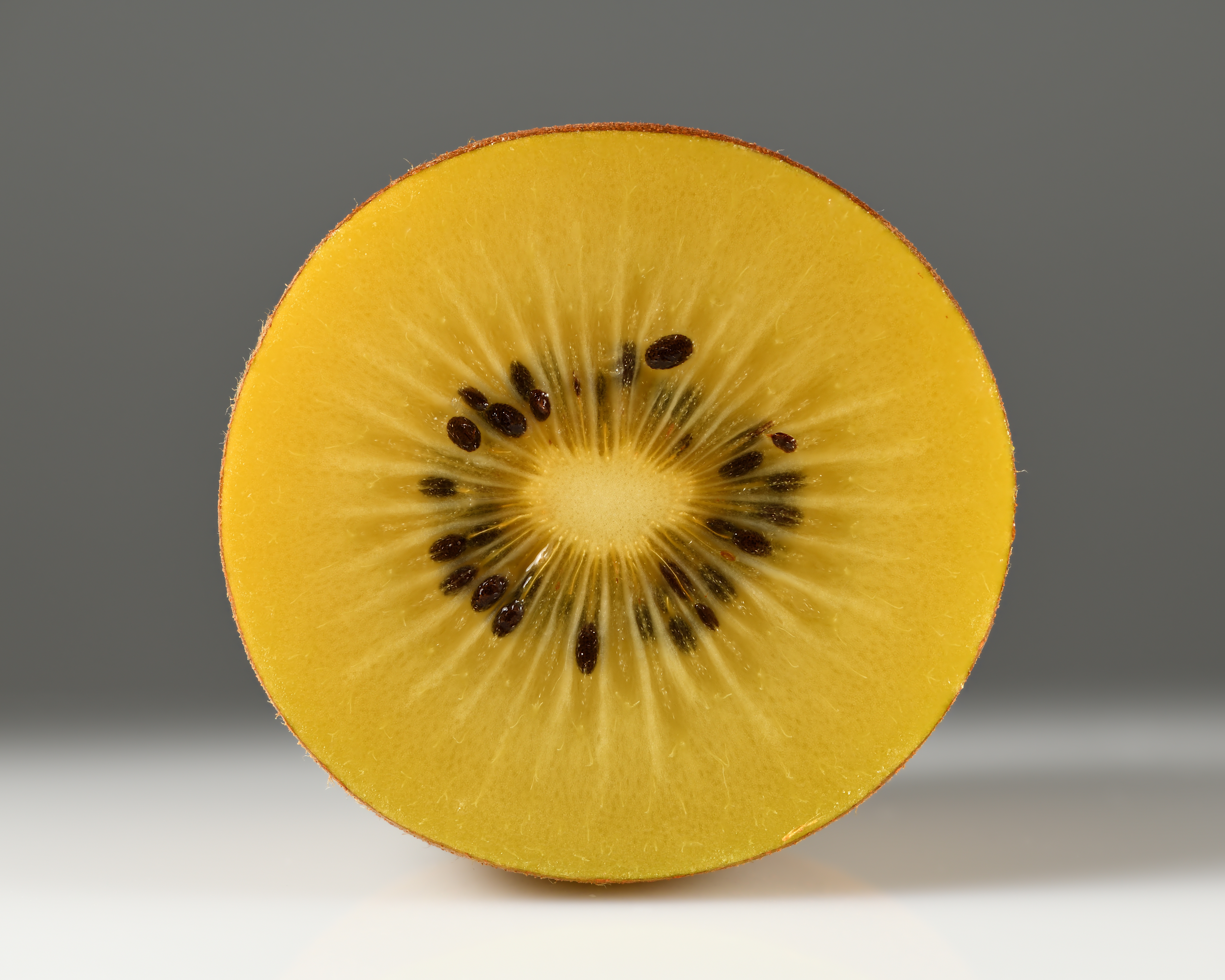
- A cross-section of a Zespri SunGold kiwifruit
- Genus: Actinidia
- Species: Actinidia chinensis var. chinensis
- Marketing names: Zespri SunGold, Jintao, Zespri Gold
- Origin: China, New Zealand

Gold kiwifruit or yellow kiwifruit refers to several kiwifruit cultivars with yellow flesh. They are grown from the species Actinidia chinensis—a close relative of Actinidia chinensis var. deliciosa, the variety known for the green-fleshed 'Hayward' cultivar.

Some of the notable commercial gold kiwifruit cultivars include Hort16A, developed by the New Zealand Department of Scientific and Industrial Research in 1991 and first marketed internationally by Zespri International Ltd in 1997 as Zespri Gold; and Jintao, a Chinese cultivar selected in 1981 by the Wuhan Institute of Botany from wild plants in Wuning County, Jiangxi Province, which entered commercial production in China and Italy by 2001. Varieties such as Hort16A and Jintao are sweeter and more aromatic than the green-fleshed 'Hayward' cultivar, with smoother skin and less fuzz. However, yellow-fleshed cultivars generally have a shorter storage life compared to Hayward, which is more resilient during storage.

During the late 2000s and early 2010s, Hort16A kiwifruit orchards were impacted by the spread of a bacterial infection caused by Pseudomonas syringae pv. actinidiae (commonly referred to as PSA), leading to significant losses of crop. In response, a new cultivar, Zesy002 (marketed as Zespri SunGold) was chosen as a replacement less susceptible to PSA. By 2022, two-thirds of kiwifruit volume produced in New Zealand were for gold kiwifruit.

== Characteristics ==
Gold kiwifruit cultivars are sweeter and less tart compared to Hayward cultivar green kiwifruit, and have a smoother, less fuzzy skin. The major cultivars range from 5–8 cm (2.0–3.1 in) in length, similar to Hayward green kiwifruit.

== History ==
=== Development ===
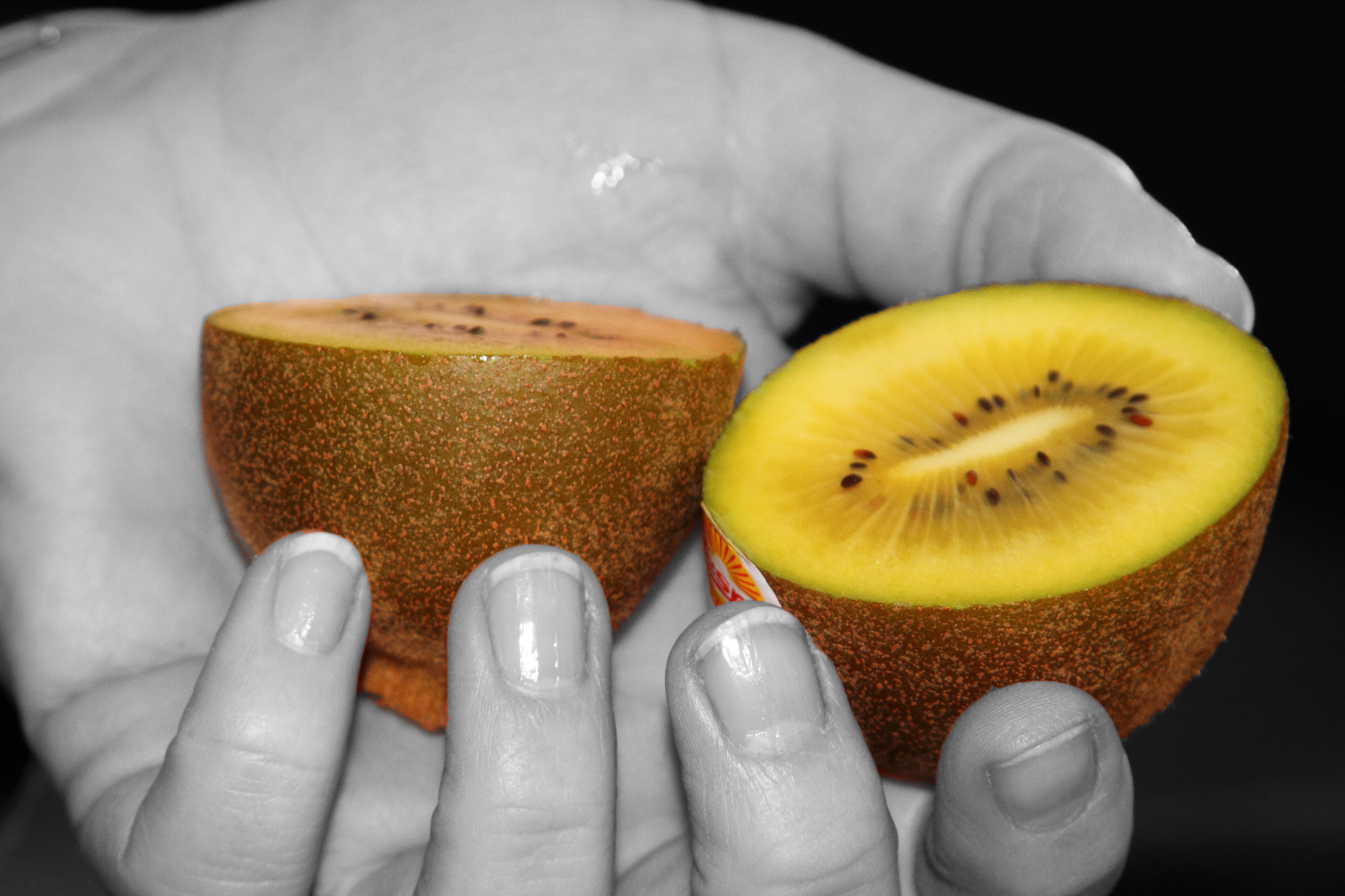
Hort16A (Zespri Gold) cross-section

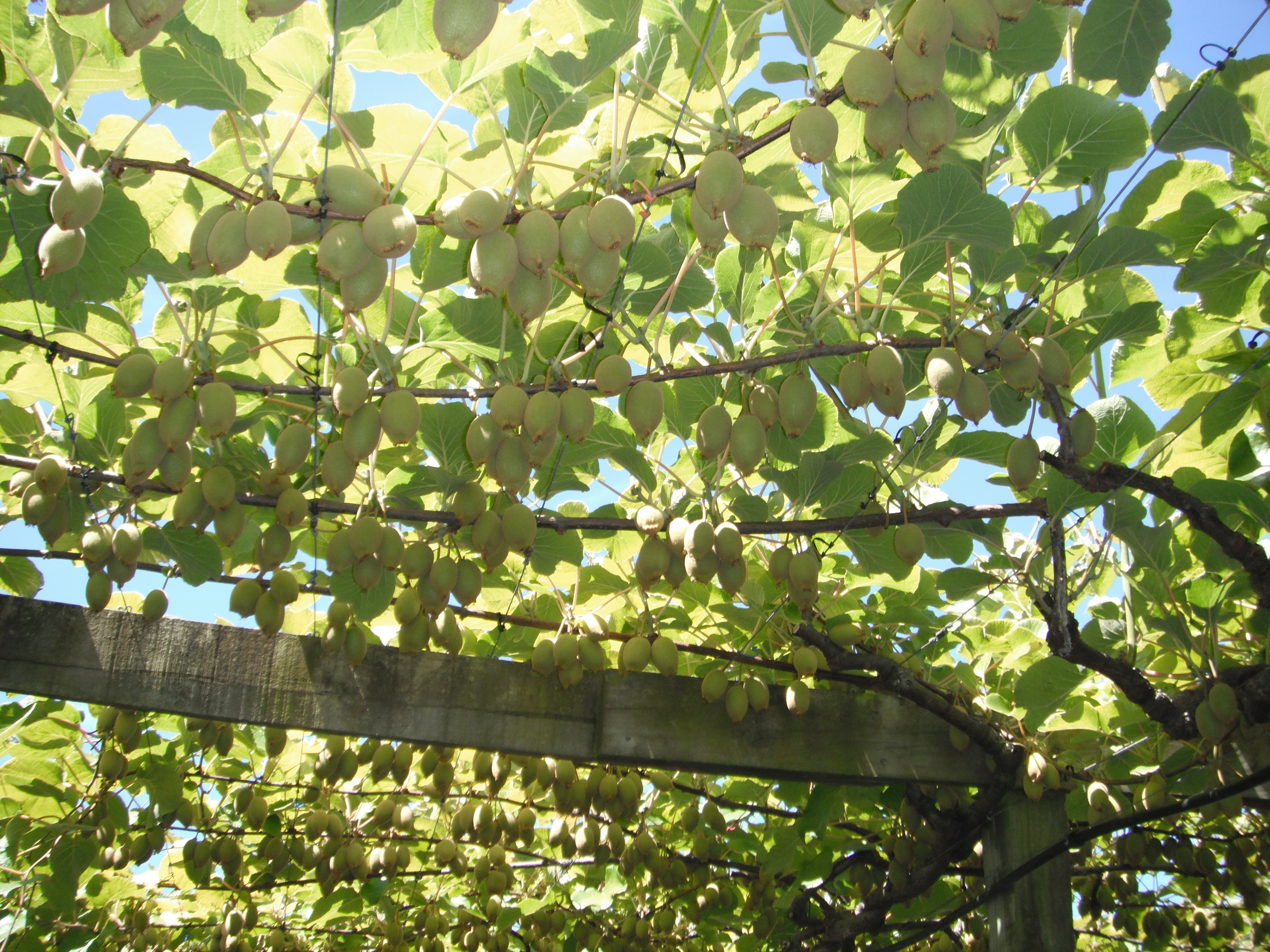
A Hort16A (Zespri Gold) orchard in New Zealand

Actinidia chinensis is a plant native to mountainous areas of central China, including the modern provinces of Hunan and Hubei. While never formally cultivated, fruit of Actinidia chinensis var. chinensis were often harvested from the wild and sold at markets in China. During the early-to-mid 20th century, a market developed in New Zealand for a closely related green-fleshed variety, Actinidia chinensis var. deliciosa, then known to New Zealanders as Chinese gooseberries. By 1959, cultivars that had developed in New Zealand were being marketed as kiwifruit. In the 1970s, Chinese horticulturists began surveying wild germplasm of Actinidia species growing in mountainous central China, in order to develop cultivars which could compete with the popularity of New Zealand kiwifruit cultivars. While trial cultivars which were investigated and developed from the wild plants primarily focused on Actinidia chinensis var. deliciosa, these surveys of wild plants revealed the potential for sweet, yellow-fleshed Actinidia chinensis var. chinensis fruit to be developed as kiwifruit cultivars. The first known commercial Actinidia chinensis var. chinensis orchard was established in Xixia County, Henan, in 1980.

From 1970, the Department of Scientific and Industrial Research of New Zealand (which later became HortResearch) focused on developing new cultivars and better propagation methods for kiwifruit. As a part of this work, seeds of Actinidia chinensis var. chinensis were imported from China between 1979 and 1981, from which the DSIR worked towards establishing gold and red varieties of kiwifruit, and cultivars of green kiwifruit which would mature more early in the year. The gold kiwifruit cultivar Hort16A was first developed by this programme in 1991, and in 1997, the first trial exports of the fruit were being undertaken. Hort16A was the first commercially successful cultivar of Actinidia fruit from a planned breeding programme. In 1999 and 2000, New Zealand kiwifruit marketers Zespri began marketing the cultivar as Zespri Gold kiwifruit on the international market. By 2001, 5.2 million trays were being exported from New Zealand.

The Chinese golden kiwifruit cultivar Jintao (Chinese: 金桃; pinyin: jīntáo; trans. "golden peach") was first identified in the Chinese national Actinidia germplasm survey in 1981, from a plant that was growing in Wuning County, Jiangxi. It was subsequently grown and evaluated at the Wuhan Institute of Botany, grown under the testing names Wuzhi No. 6 and WIB-C-6.

Jintao was introduced to Europe in 1998 through a European Union–funded project (INCO-DC). Between 1998 and 2000, it underwent evaluations with institutions including I.N.R.A. in Bordeaux (France), the University of Thessaloniki (Greece), and the University of Udine (Italy). By 2001, graftings of the fruit were officially sold for propagation in Italy. The exclusive breeding and marketing rights for Jintao were sold to the Italian company Jingold in the same year, which facilitated its production in multiple countries, including Portugal, Chile, Argentina, and South Africa. In 2017, Jingold and China's government-run Wuhan Botanical Garden, jointly launched the Goodwei brand specifically for kiwifruit produced in China. In 2018, the Goodwei brand secured the exclusive license to introduce the Jintao variety to the Chinese market for the first time.

In parallel, a distinct cultivar, Jinyan, was developed through a hybridization process in 1984, between Actinidia eriantha (female parent) and A. chinensis var. chinensis (male parent) at the Wuhan Botanic Garden. Since 1996, field trials of Jinyan have shown its ability to adapt to a range of climates, withstanding both high summer temperatures and cold winters, making it suitable for different growing regions in China. Extensive screening and genetic stability testing from 1984 to 2006 led to the official naming of Jinyan in 2009. It was granted Plant Variety Rights by the Ministry of Agriculture of the People's Republic of China in the same year and was authorized by the National Forestry Cultivar Approval Committee in 2010. The China New Agricultural Science & Technology Co. Ltd., in Sichuan province, holds the right to cultivate Jinyan in China, and it has since become widely commercialized for kiwifruit production in the country.

Gold kiwifruit cultivars, especially Zespri Gold, proved to be popular internationally, making up a third of the total kiwifruit sales in the New Zealand industry by 2010. Licensed orchards for Zespri Gold were established in Northern Hemisphere countries, including France, Italy, South Korea and Japan. Interest in gold and red cultivars of Actinidia chinensis var. chinensis has significantly increased, and by 2020 half of the total plantings in China were of Actinidia chinensis var. chinensis (although two thirds of these were for red fleshed varieties).

New cultivars of gold kiwifruit are being developed by Italian breeding programmes, including Soreli and AC1536.

=== PSA and SunGold ===
In 2007, bacterial infection caused by Pseudomonas syringae pv. actinidiae (commonly referred to as PSA) began significantly impacting orchards growing Hort16A variety kiwifruit in New Zealand, causing significant economic losses. In 2012, almost half of New Zealand's yellow kiwifruit was lost, and within a few years, Hort16A (i.e. Zespri Gold) could no longer be widely grown commercially. In response, the industry rapidly replaced vines with a different variety called Zesy002 (originally cultivated in 2002), which was significantly more resistant to PSA. By 2012, Zespri had begun marketing the cultivar as Zespri SunGold, and by 2015, approximately 30 million trays of gold kiwifruit were being exported from New Zealand, becoming the highest volume season to date. By 2018, almost all Hort16A orchards in New Zealand had been disestablished, and 6,500 ha (16,000 acres) of Zesy002 orchards had been planted.

As of 2022, two-thirds of the New Zealand kiwifruit market by volume was gold kiwifruit, and in 2020 gold kiwifruit composed 25% of the Italian kiwifruit market. As of 2023, Zespri SunGold is the most widely planted gold kiwifruit cultivar internationally outside of China, followed by Jintao.

== Cultivars ==
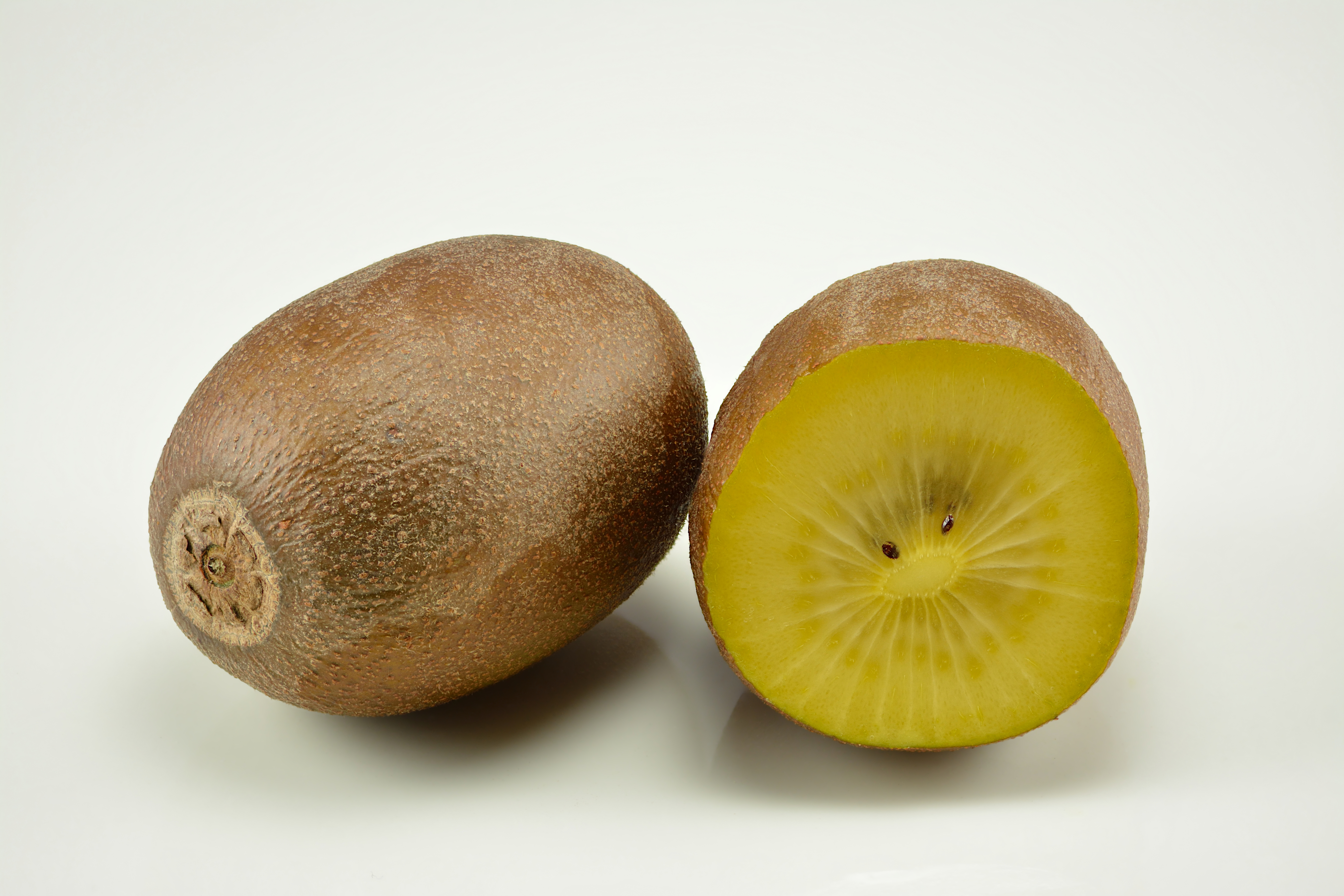
Soreli type kiwifruit, a cultivar developed in Italy

Some varieties of gold kiwifruit include:

- AC1536 or Dori, a relative of Dori Europe developed by Consorzio Dori Europe, highly productive, yellow intense and very early variety
- A-19 or Enza Gold, the variety most similar to the green kiwifruit, both in acidity and in external appearance;
- Hort16A or Zespri Gold, the first variety of yellow kiwi;
- JB Gold or Kiwi Kiss, highly productive and large
- Jintao or Jin Gold, highly productive, smaller than Hort16A and of Chinese origin;
- Jinyan, a cultivar of Chinese origin and a hybrid between the species Actinidia eriantha and Actinidia chinensis var. chinensis.
- Soreli, highly productive, of Italian origin;
- Zesy002, marketed as Zespri SunGold and formerly known as Gold3

== See also ==
- Hayward, the most cultivated kiwifruit variety
