= Wuhan Botanical Garden =

Botanical garden in Wuhan, China

Coordinates: 30°32′40″N 114°25′24″E

Wuhan Botanical Garden, or WBG (simplified Chinese: 武汉植物园; traditional Chinese: 武漢植物園; pinyin: Wǔhàn Zhíwùyuán), is a research institution under the Chinese Academy of Sciences (CAS), located in Wuhan, Hubei, China. It specializes in plant conservation, biodiversity research, and agricultural innovation, including the breeding of improved kiwifruit cultivars.

Established in 1956, and opened to the public in 1958, WBG is one of China's three research-oriented botanical gardens and houses a collection of more than 4000 species of flora. It conducts public education programs to raise awareness about plant life and biodiversity amongst the general public. The garden was founded to develop and maintain plant collections for display, conservation, education, and research, contributing to ecological preservation and sustainable agriculture in China.

WBG features 16 specialty gardens, including its Kiwifruit Garden and the National Kiwifruit Germplasm Repository, which house over 70% of the world’s kiwifruit species, making it the largest kiwifruit gene bank globally. The repository has officially validated or protected 73 kiwifruit varieties and archived 426 high-quality strains, including the Donghong, Jinyan, and Jintao varieties. To help commercialize and promote these varieties, WBG founded CASGOLD Chengdu Supply Chain Management Co. Ltd. (CASGOLD).

The garden is also home to the Aquatic Plant Garden, the largest of its kind in the world, along with China’s biggest Wild Fruit Garden, Rare and Endangered Plant Garden, and Medicinal Herb Garden.

== Location ==
WBG is located in the eastern part of the city, on a peninsula in the East Lake. The garden has an area of 70 hectares and has several landscapes, and different types of gardens, which include:

== Specialty Gardens ==
- Aquatic Plant Garden
- Rare Endangered Plant Garden
- Chinese Gooseberry Garden
- Ornamental Garden
- Tree Garden
- Pine and Cypress Garden
- Bamboo Garden

WBG has emerged as the largest biodiversity protection base of Central China, and a base for north subtropical flora in entire China.

WBG's activities also include organizing symposia. It has relations with around 44 countries for seed exchange and technique cooperation.

WBG's contributions include assisting the city of Wuhan and Hubei province in protecting the environment.

Since its inception, WBG has selected and bred more than forty new varieties of fruit trees, and has undertaken extensive forestation and cultivation of medicinal plants.

Its contributions include plant propagation spreading technique, consultancy, training, and planning for afforesting activities.
