= Mary Fraser Wesselhoeft =

American artist

- Born: February 15, 1873; Boston, Massachusetts
- Died: March 23, 1971 (aged 98); Santa Barbara, California
- Education: School of the Museum of Fine Arts, Boston, Massachusetts
- Known for: Watercolor, Graphic Art, Illustrating, Stained glass

Mary Fraser Wesselhoeft (February 15, 1873 – March 23, 1971) was an American graphic artist, watercolorist, and stained-glass artist.

== Life ==
Mary Wesselhoeft was born in Boston, Massachusetts.

She graduated from the School of the Museum of Fine Arts, studying under Denman Ross and Charles Herbert Woodbury in Boston. Wesselhoeft also later studied under Hugo von Habermann in Munich.

Wesselhoeft worked in Cambridge, Massachusetts; New York City, New York; and Santa Barbara, California. In 1900, she taught drawing at Miss Webster's Private School in Cambridge. By 1922, she had moved to New York City, where she set up a studio on Sixth Avenue and Eleventh Street. Her work was also part of the painting event in the art competition at the 1932 Summer Olympics.

== Media/Style ==
Wesselhoeft experimented with a variety of artistic medias, including: oils, watercolor, stained glass design, and crafting. As an American artist of the west, she is noted for her landscapes of Santa Barbara and of New Mexico, and portraits of Native Americans. Wesselhoeft created her glass works using both painted and unpainted glass, and is noted for her ecclesiastical designs. Wesselhoeft's stained-glass artwork was praised for its notoriety by the New York Times:

"Something quite new in glass is being done by a young woman, Miss Mary Fraser Wesselhoeft... she is the first person as far as known who has attempted to put the so-called independent art into glass... Miss Wesselhoeft believes that the simplicity of line and strong contrast of color in the work of the modern artists lends themselves to reproduction in glass."

== Exhibitions ==
- Boston Art Club.
- California State Fair.
- California Watercolor Society.
- Chicago Art Institute, (date unknown).
- Independent Show (date unknown). "The Flight Into Egypt." Glass.
- New York Architectural League, 1922.
- Salons of America.
- Whitney Museum of American Art.
- Whitney Studio Club, (date unknown). Exhibition of Water Colors - Thomas H. Donnelly, Richard Lahey, Richard Marwede, Mary F. Wesselhoeft & Designs for Stained Glass by Miss Wesselhoeft. November 28 - December 14.

== Notable works ==
Stained glass window in the nave of the Grace and Holy Trinity Cathedral in Kansas City, Missouri, designed in 1912.

"Madam W.," drypoint, 1908. Smithsonian American Art Museum Collection.

Rose Window of the Unitarian Church, Santa Barbara, California.

"Portrait of Mrs. Perez Morton."

== Memberships ==
Wesselhoft was a member of various notable art societies:

- The American Artists Congress.
- The Copley Society of Art, the oldest non-profit art association in the United States, founded in 1879.
- The California Water Color Society (later known as the California National Watercolor Society (1967) and the National Watercolor Society (1975)).
- The Salons of America.
- The Santa Barbara Art Association.
- The Society of Independent Artists.
