= Mary Isabel Fraser =

New Zealand educationalist (1863–1942)

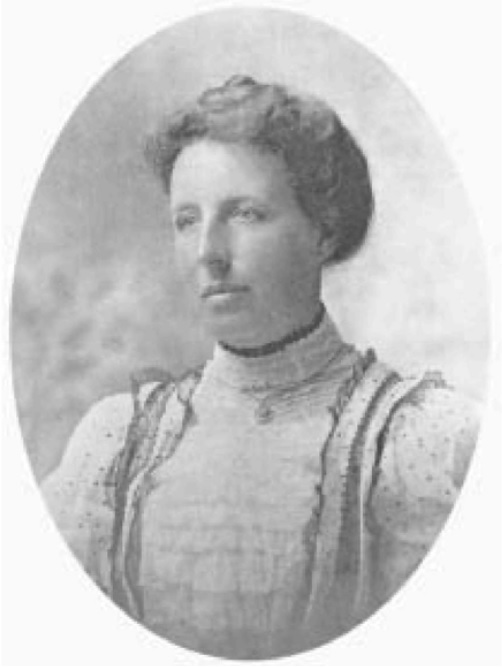
- Portrait of Mary Isabel Fraser in 1910 (aged 45).
- Born: March 20, 1863; Dunedin, New Zealand
- Died: April 18, 1942 (aged 79); Ibid.
- Education: MA in Physics (1889).
- Alma mater: University of Otago
- Occupations: Teacher; school principal; educationalist
- Years active: 1890 ~ 1921
- Known for: Girls' education, Kiwifruit culture.
- Title: Lady principal of Whanganui Girls' College (1894-1910), of Iona College (1914-1921).
- Movement: Feminism.
- Spouse: Never married.

Mary Isabel Fraser (20 March 1863 – 18 April 1942) was a New Zealand teacher, school principal and educationalist.

Throughout her career as a teacher and then as a school principal, she was a strong advocate for girls' education.

She is also known for having introduced, after returning from a trip to Yichang in China, the first kiwifruit seeds in New Zealand, in 1904. This allowed nurseryman Alexander Allison to grow plants from these seeds, and it was from this experience that the worldwide kiwifruit industry developed.
