= Zespri =

Kiwifruit marketer from New Zealand

Zespri International Ltd
- Industry: Horticulture
- Headquarters: Mount Maunganui, New Zealand
- Key people: Jason Te Brake, CEO
- Revenue: NZ$5.14 billion (2024)
- Net income: NZ$155.2 million (2024)
- Website: Zespri.com

Zespri International Limited is the largest marketer of kiwifruit in the world, selling in over 50 countries. Its international headquarters is in Mount Maunganui, New Zealand. However, it has licensed growers in Australia, France, Greece, Italy, Japan, and South Korea, with trials in place in several other countries. Kiwifruit from New Zealand is available from May to October. To satisfy year-round consumer demand, Zespri markets kiwifruit from Italy from November to January.

Zespri's portfolio of kiwifruit varieties includes Green, Organic, and SunGold.

== History ==
Zespri was first established in 1988 under the name of the "New Zealand Marketing Board" before it formed as a co-operative of kiwifruit growers in New Zealand in 2000 and renamed itself "Zespri International Ltd."

Cuttings of Zespri Sungold Kiwifruit have been smuggled back into China, where kiwifruit originated. Fruit grown in unauthorized orchards compete with domestic varietals in the China market.

Zespri's popularity has seen a recent increase in Australia, due largely in part to a marketing campaign containing two dancing and singing kiwifruit.

In February 2023 Zespri said that they were planning on listing on the NZX later that year. Kiwifruit growers would still be the only people who could own Zespri shares.

== Growing locations ==
Zespri kiwis are grown in various locations around the world to provide the fruit in every season. The company has 2500 licensed growers in New Zealand, 800 in Japan, 500 in Italy, 130 in South Korea and 100 in France, and also in Greece and Australia.

== Kiwi Brothers ==
The Kiwi Brothers are mascot characters of Zespri International Japan Co., Ltd. (Zespri's Japanese subsidiary). A character unit based on Zespri's flagship product, kiwifruit. When they first appeared, there were two: Green, the Green Kiwi, and Gold, the Sungold Kiwi. Later, Red, the Ruby Red, joined them. Although they are called "Brothers," they are not actually brothers.

Zespri previously used a character called "Zespri-kun," but in 2016, the Kiwi Brothers were introduced. For the first two years, the characters were only available in Japan, but due to their popularity in Japan and the promotional effect of the characters success, Zespri began to expand overseas, and in 2018, the characters were used in promotions in the Netherlands, and in 2019, in South Korea and other countries.

In April 2022, at the company's ceremony (commemorating the start of sales of this season's Kiwi), the Kiwi Brothers mascots performed a dance to "Kōjō no Tsuki", which caused a stir on social media. New Zealand Prime Minister Jacinda Ardern also attended the event and posed for a commemorative photo with the Brothers.

== Kiwifruit Breeding Centre ==
The Kiwifruit Breeding Centre is an even joint venture between Plant & Food Research and Zespri, based in Te Puke that commenced in October 2021. It also operates out of Kerikeri, Motueka and Mt Albert. It is a research and development centre focused on improving kiwifruit breeding and cultivation. The initial aims are to develop kiwifruit varieties that are healthier, better tasting, and more sustainable for the environment. Matt Glenn is the inaugural CEO of the centre.
