= Actinidia oregonensis =

Actinidia oregonensis Temporal range: Middle Eocene, 45–43 Mya

Scientific classification
- Kingdom: Plantae
- Clade: Tracheophytes
- Clade: Angiosperms
- Clade: Eudicots
- Clade: Asterids
- Order: Ericales
- Family: Actinidiaceae
- Genus: Actinidia
- Species: A. oregonensis

Binomial name
- Actinidia oregonensis Manchester

Extinct species of vine

Actinidia oregonensis is an extinct species of flowering plants in the kiwifruit family, Actinidiaceae, solely known from the middle Eocene sediments exposed in north-central Oregon. The species was first described from a series of isolated fossil seeds in chert.

== History and classification ==
Actinidia oregonensis has been identified from a single location in the Clarno Formation, the Clarno nut beds, type locality for both the formation and the species. The nut beds are approximately 3 kilometres (1.9 mi) east of the unincorporated community of Clarno, Oregon, and considered to be middle Eocene in age, based on averaging zircon fission track radiometric dating which yielded an age of 43.6 and 43.7 ± 10 million years ago and argon–argon dating radiometric dating which yielded a 36.38 ± 1.31 to 46.8 ± 3.36 Mya date. The average of the dates resulted in an age range of 45 to 43 Mya. The beds are composed of silica and calcium carbonate cemented tuffaceous sandstones, siltstones, and conglomerates which preserve either a lake delta environment or periodic floods and volcanic mudflows preserved with hot spring activity.

The species was described from a series of type specimens, the holotype specimen UF 6292, and a group of five paratypes which are preserved in the paleobotanical collections of the University of Florida in Gainesville, Florida. An additional paratype, USNM 355370, is in the National Museum of Natural History collections in Washington, D.C. The fossils were part of a group of approximately 20,000 specimens collected from 1942 to 1989 by Thomas Bones, A. W. Hancock, R. A. Scott, Steven R. Manchester, and some high school students.

The Actinidia oregonensis specimens were studied by paleobotanist Steven R. Manchester of the University of Florida. He published his 1994 type description for A. oregonensis in the journal Palaeontographica Americana. The specific epithet oregonensis was chosen in recognition of the state of Oregon where the fossils were found. Actinidia oregonensis was the first Actinidia species to be named from North America.

== Description ==
The seeds of Actinidia oregonensis are bilaterally symmetrical with an elongated elliptical shape and pointed tip and base. The seeds have an overall length ranging between 3.2–4.4 millimetres (0.13–0.17 in) and a width between 2.2–3.0 centimetres (0.87–1.18 in). The seeds are identified as belonging to an Actinidia species by the exterior morphology and by the structure of the vascular supply system. The overall cross-section shape is lensoid, with a keel along the plane of symmetry. The 1-millimetre (0.039 in) thick seed coat morphology shows the same morphology as that in modern Actinidia species, with distinct polygonal cells that decrease in size towards the raphe and antiraphe edges of the seeds. The seeds are larger than seen in the modern species A. arguta, A. callosa, A. chinensis, and A. strigosa. In contrast, the seeds of the Pliocene fossil species A. foveolata of Europe range in size from 1.8–4.0 millimetres (0.071–0.157 in).
