= Actinidia rubus =

Scientific classification
- Kingdom: Plantae
- Clade: Tracheophytes
- Clade: Angiosperms
- Clade: Eudicots
- Clade: Asterids
- Order: Ericales
- Family: Actinidiaceae
- Genus: Actinidia
- Species: A. rubus

Binomial name
- Actinidia rubus Lév.

Species of vine

Actinidia rubus is a woody climbing vine of the Actinidiaceae family and native to mountainous areas of the Chinese provinces of Sichuan and Yunnan. Its branchlets and petioles are deep reddish brown, and its yellow dioecious flowers develop in June and are pollinated by bees and insects.
