= Actinidia ulmifolia =

Conservation status
- Vulnerable (IUCN 3.1)

Scientific classification
- Kingdom: Plantae
- Clade: Tracheophytes
- Clade: Angiosperms
- Clade: Eudicots
- Clade: Asterids
- Order: Ericales
- Family: Actinidiaceae
- Genus: Actinidia
- Species: A. ulmifolia

Binomial name
- Actinidia ulmifolia C.F.Liang

Species of vine

Actinidia ulmifolia is a species of flowering plant in the Actinidiaceae family. It is a shrub endemic to Sichuan province of south-central China.
