= Actinidia laevissima =

Conservation status
- Vulnerable (IUCN 3.1)

Scientific classification
- Kingdom: Plantae
- Clade: Tracheophytes
- Clade: Angiosperms
- Clade: Eudicots
- Clade: Asterids
- Order: Ericales
- Family: Actinidiaceae
- Genus: Actinidia
- Species: A. laevissima

Binomial name
- Actinidia laevissima C.F.Liang

Species of vine

Actinidia laevissima is a species of plant in the Actinidiaceae family. It is a shrub endemic to Guizhou province in southern China.
