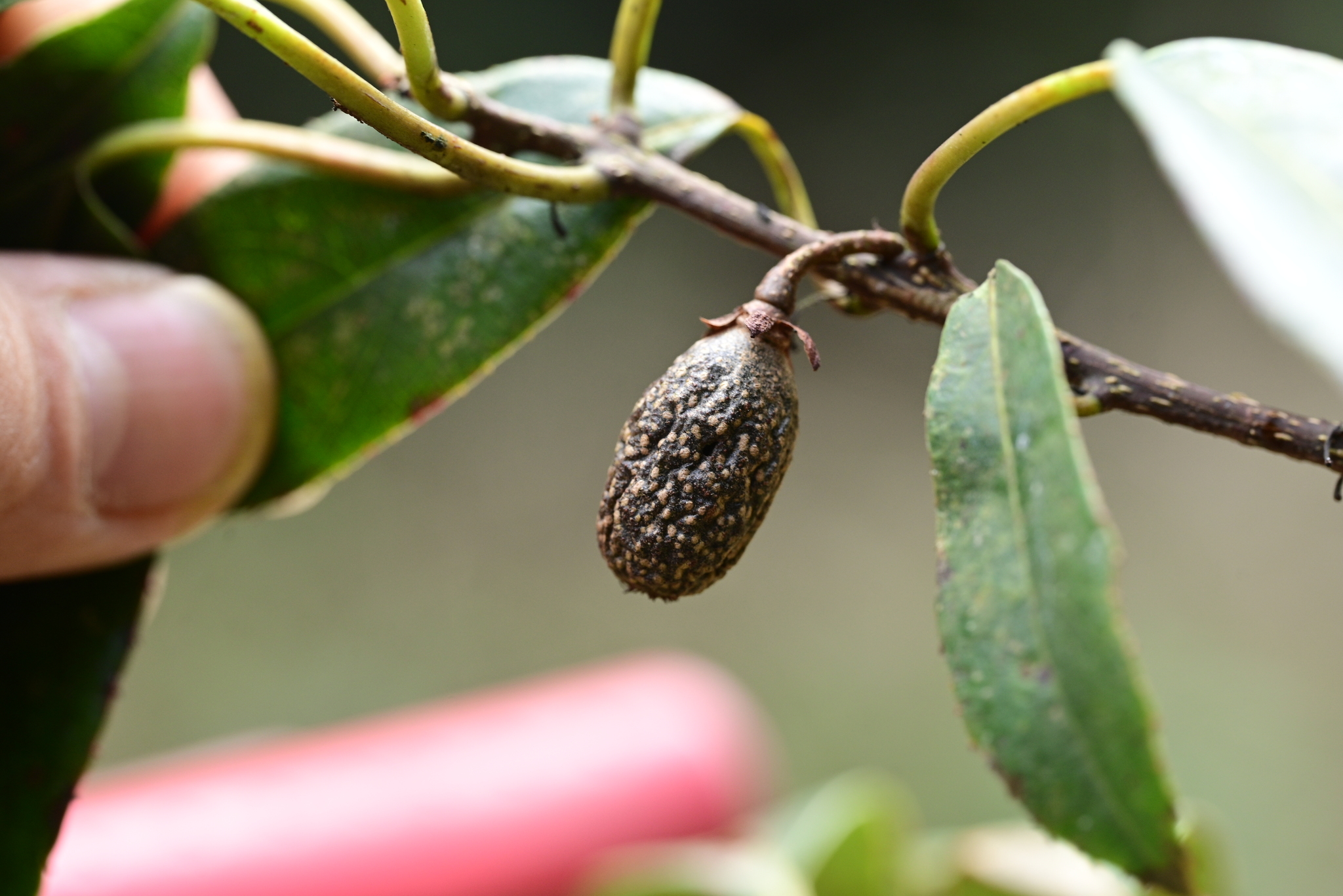

Scientific classification
- Kingdom: Plantae
- Clade: Tracheophytes
- Clade: Angiosperms
- Clade: Eudicots
- Clade: Asterids
- Order: Ericales
- Family: Actinidiaceae
- Genus: Actinidia
- Species: A. rubricaulis

Binomial name
- Actinidia rubricaulis Dunn

= Actinidia rubricaulis =

Species of vine

Actinidia rubricaulis is a species of plant in the Actinidiaceae family. It is found across southern China and southeast asia as far as northern Thailand.

== Habitat ==
The species primarily grows in temperate areas.

== Subspecies ==
Actinidia rubricaulis var. coriacea is a subspecies of the plant, found in southern China.
