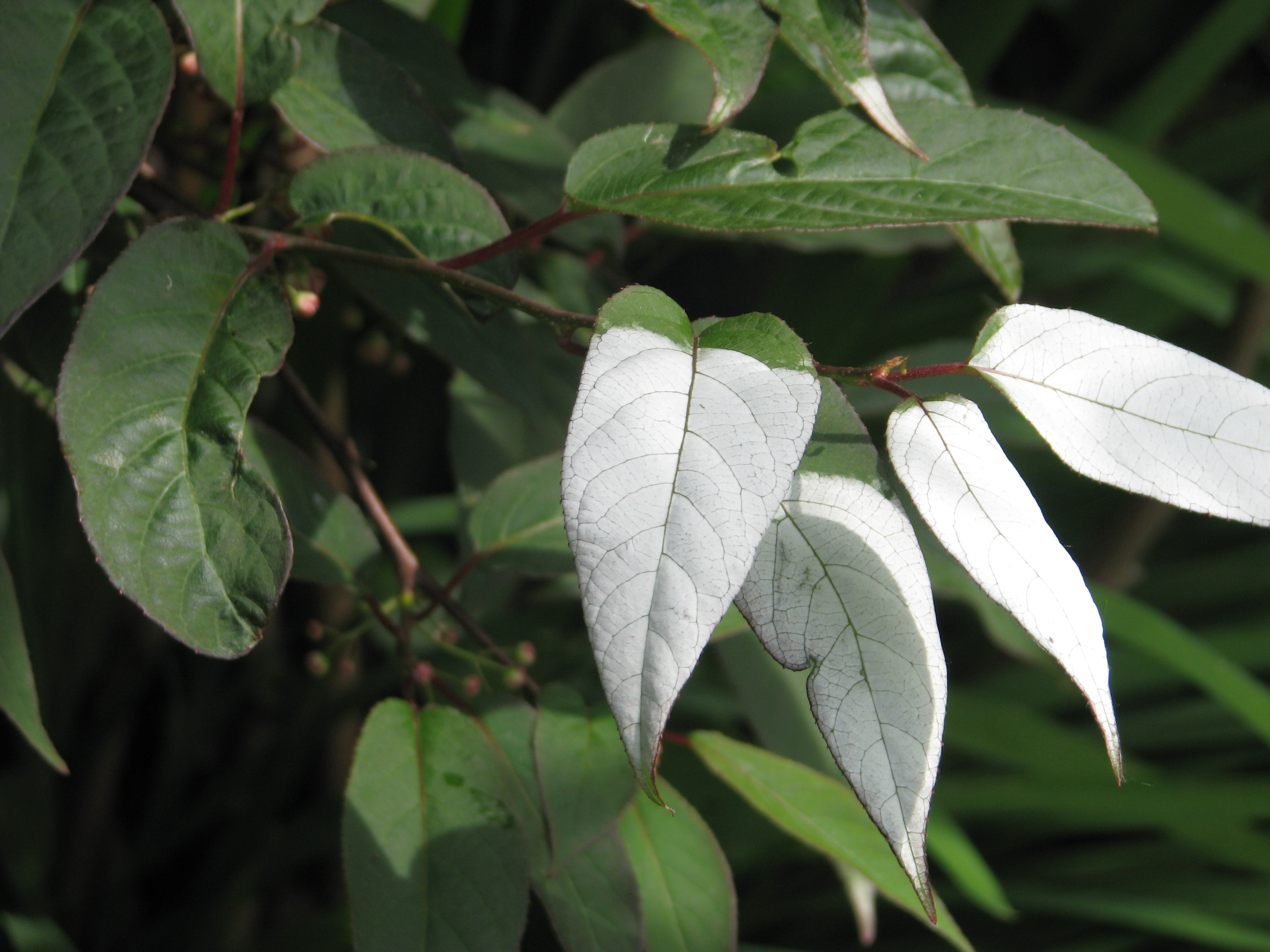
- Actinidia tetramera var. maloides

Scientific classification
- Kingdom: Plantae
- Clade: Tracheophytes
- Clade: Angiosperms
- Clade: Eudicots
- Clade: Asterids
- Order: Ericales
- Family: Actinidiaceae
- Genus: Actinidia
- Species: A. tetramera

Binomial name
- Actinidia tetramera Maxim.

= Actinidia tetramera =

Species of vine

Actinidia tetramera is a species of flowering plant belonging to the family Actinidiaceae, that is native to Central China. It is a vigorous climber that can reach 8 m (26 ft) tall and broad. The ovate leaves are dark green with bright white flashes on the surface. The species is dioecious, meaning that male and female plants are separate. Fruit is only borne on a fertilised female plant. In Mandarin Chinese, the plant is known as sìè míhóutáo (Chinese: 四萼猕猴桃; trans. "four calyx kiwifruit").

This plant is valued in cultivation for its ornamental qualities. It prefers a sheltered spot in sun or partial shade. In the UK, the variety A. tetramera var. maloides has gained the Royal Horticultural Society's Award of Garden Merit.

== Varieties ==
- Actinidia tetramera var. badongensis
- Actinidia tetramera var. maloides
- Actinidia tetramera var. tetramera
