= Actinidia henryi =

Scientific classification
- Kingdom: Plantae
- Clade: Tracheophytes
- Clade: Angiosperms
- Clade: Eudicots
- Clade: Asterids
- Order: Ericales
- Family: Actinidiaceae
- Genus: Actinidia
- Species: A. henryi

Binomial name
- Actinidia henryi Dunn

Synonyms
- Actinidia carnosifolia C.Y.Wu; Actinidia carnosifolia var. glaucescens C.F.Liang; Actinidia henryi var. polyodonta Hand.-Mazz.

Species of plant

Actinidia henryi is a species of flowering plant in the Chinese gooseberry family Actinidiaceae, native to southern China. A semi-evergreen climbing shrub, it is found in mountain forests and thickets at elevations from 1,400 to 2,500 m (4,600 to 8,200 ft). It has the lowest known vitamin C content of any kiwifruit.
