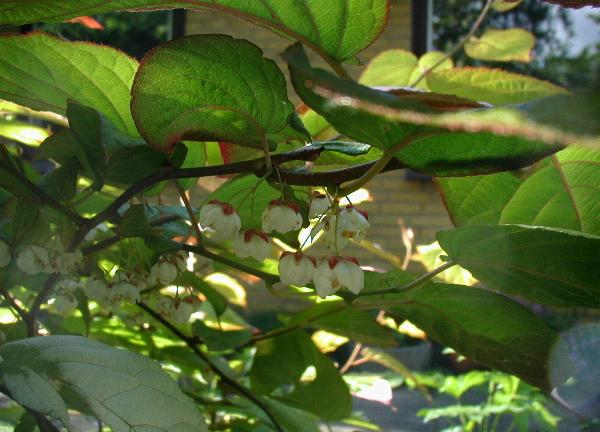
- Actinidia kolomikta ('Arctic Beauty')

Scientific classification
- Kingdom: Plantae
- Clade: Tracheophytes
- Clade: Angiosperms
- Clade: Eudicots
- Clade: Asterids
- Order: Ericales
- Family: Actinidiaceae
- Genus: Actinidia; Lindl.

Type species
- Actinidia callosa Lindl.

= Actinidia =

Actinidia Temporal range: Middle Eocene–recent; 45–0 Mya

Genus of plants native to temperate eastern Asia

Actinidia /ˌæktɪˈnɪdiə/ is a genus of woody and, with a few exceptions, dioecious plants native to temperate eastern Asia, occurring throughout most of China, Taiwan, Korea, and Japan, and extending north to southern areas of Russian Far East and south into Indochina. The genus includes shrubs growing to 6 metres (20 feet) tall, and vigorous, strong-growing vines, growing up to 30 m (100 ft) in tree canopies. They mostly tolerate temperatures down to around −15 °C (5 °F), and some are much hardier.

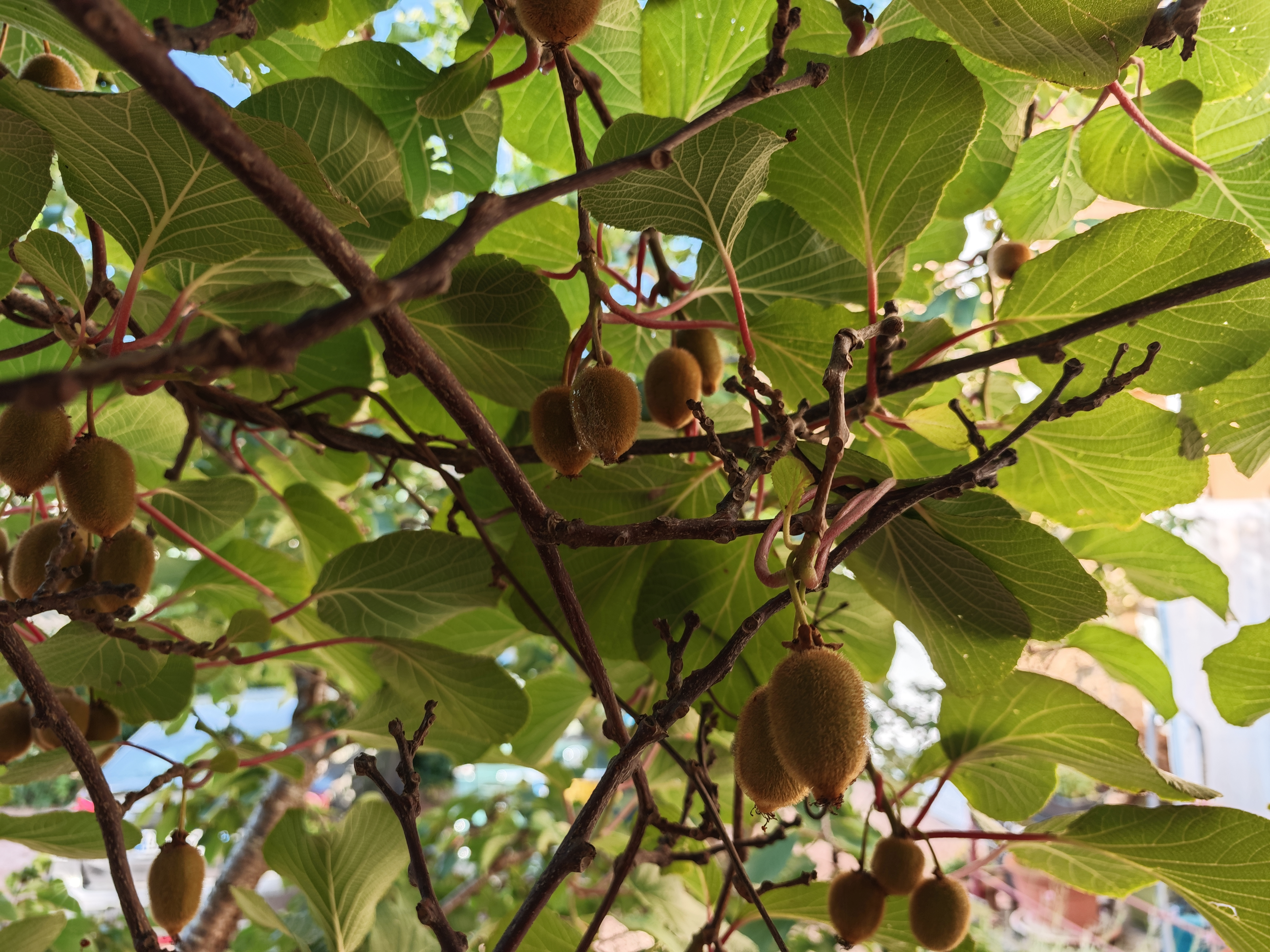
Kiwifruit developing on Actinidia vines

The leaves are alternate and simple, with a dentated margin and a long petiole. The flowers are solitary or in axillary cymes, usually white, with five small petals. Most of the species are dioecious with separate male and female plants, but some are monoecious. The fruit is a large berry containing numerous small seeds; in most species, the fruit is edible. In particular, this genus is known for the taxon Actinidia chinensis var. deliciosa, one of the most common cultivated kiwifruits, and for the hardy ornamental Actinidia kolomikta.

== Description ==
Actinidia are perennial climbing vines, typically found in the lower storey of forests, along stream beds and at forest margins. Some species of Actinidia can form dense thickets, such as Actinidia kolomikta and Actinidia venosa.

Actinidia leaves alternate, and typically have a long petiole, covered in hairs in some members of the genus. Leaves can be variable in size and shape, even within individual plants. Members of Actinidia have dioecious flowers, and have cup-shaped flowers, typically with five or more petals.

The fruit of Actinidia is a berry with hundreds of small, darkly-coloured seeds, embedded into the fruit flesh. The fruit is often a bright green colour due to the presence of chlorophyll, something uncommonly found in ripe fruit. Fruit flesh often ranges from bright yellow to dark green, depending on the species.

== Range and fossil record ==
Actinidia species are commonly found in south-western China, though they range from Siberia to Indonesia. The greatest number of taxa found in the wild are in the Yunnan province, where almost half of the known species are endemic to Yunnan. Other provinces of China with significant populations of wild Actinidia include Guanxi, Hunan, Sichuan, Guizhou, Jiangxi, Zhejiang, Guangdong, Hubei and Fujian. Fossils of the extinct species A. faveolata are known from Europe and Western Siberia extending from the Upper Oligocene to the Early Pleistocene, suggesting that the genus was previously more wide-spread across the world.

== Species ==
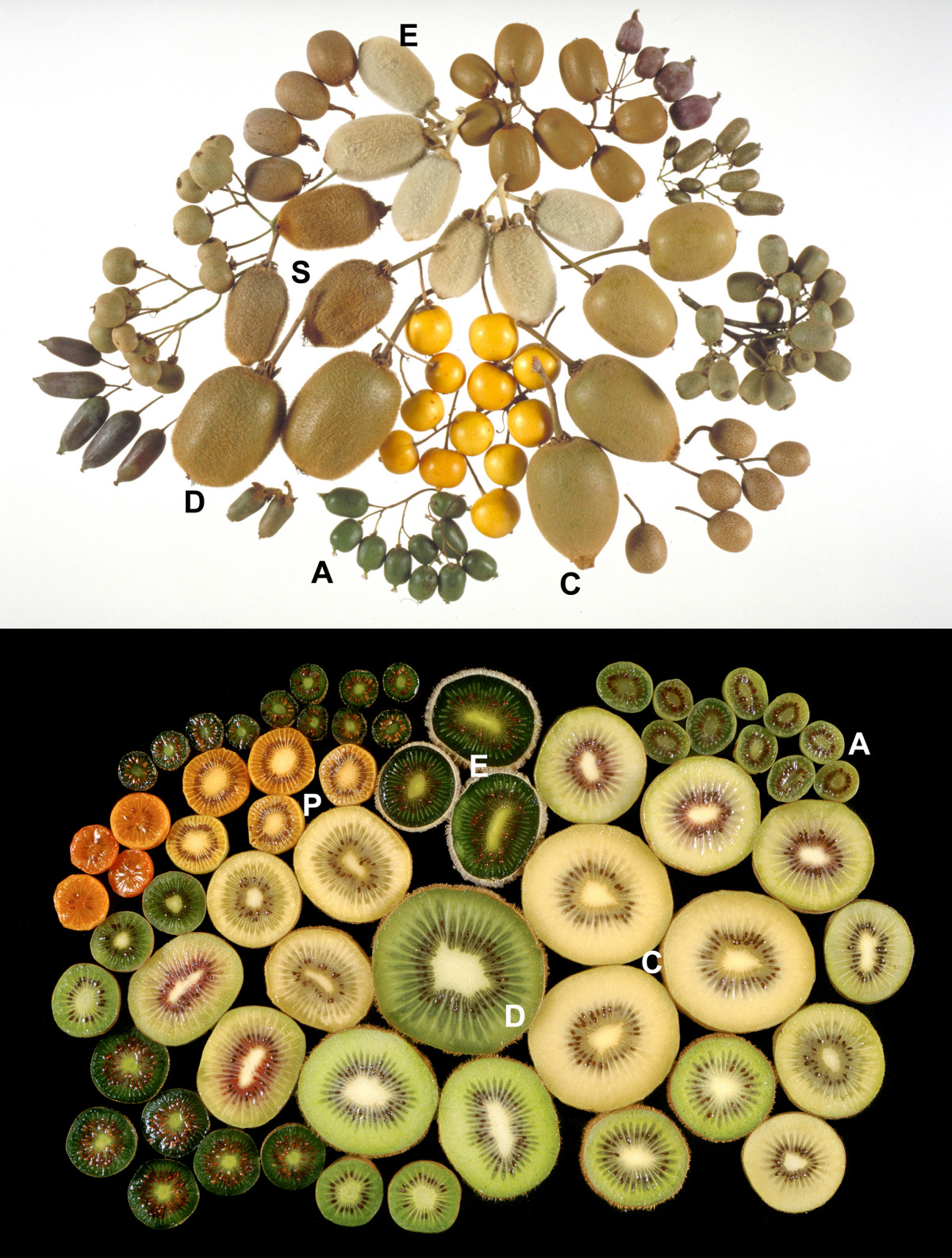
Actinidia spp. fruits A = A. arguta, C = A. chinensis var. chinensis, D = A. chinensis var. deliciosa, E = A. eriantha, I = A. indochinensis, P = A. polygama, S = A. setosa

The 40–60 species of Actinidia include:

- Actinidia acuminata
- Actinidia arguta – kokuwa, tara vine, hardy kiwi, hearty red kiwifruit, purple kiwi
  - A. arguta var. giraldii
  - A. arguta var. hypoleuca
- Actinidia callosa
  - A. callosa var. acuminata
  - A. callosa var. discolor
  - A. callosa var. ephippioides
  - A. callosa var. formosana
  - A. callosa var. henryi
  - A. callosa var. strigillosa
- Actinidia chengkouensis
- Actinidia chinensis
  - A. chinensis var. deliciosa – kiwifruit, mihoutao or Chinese gooseberry
  - A. chinensis var. setosa – Taiwanese kiwifruit
- Actinidia chrysantha
- Actinidia cylindrica
  - A. cylindrica var. cylindrica
  - A. cylindrica var. reticulata
- Actinidia eriantha
- Actinidia farinosa
- Actinidia fasciculoides
  - A. fasciculoides var. cuneata
  - A. fasciculoides var. orbiculata
- †Actinidia faveolata
- Actinidia fortunatii
- Actinidia fulvicoma
  - A. fulvicoma var. cinerascens
  - A. fulvicoma var. hirsuta
  - A. fulvicoma var. pachyphylla
- †Actinidia germanica
- Actinidia glaucocallosa
- Actinidia grandiflora
- Actinidia hemsleyana
- Actinidia henryi
- Actinidia holotricha
- Actinidia hubeiensis
- Actinidia indochinensis
- Actinidia jijiangensis
- Actinidia kolomikta – arctic beauty kiwi, kolomikta, miyamatatabi, super-hardy kiwi, variegated-leaf hardy kiwi
- Actinidia laevissima
- Actinidia lanceolata
- Actinidia latifolia
  - A. latifolia var. mollis
- Actinidia liangguangensis
- Actinidia lijiangensis
- Actinidia linguiensis
- Actinidia longicarpa
- Actinidia macrosperma
  - A. macrosperma var. mumoides
- Actinidia melanandra – purple kiwi, red kiwi
  - A. melanandra var. glabrescens
- Actinidia melliana
- Actinidia obovata
- †Actinidia oregonensis
- Actinidia pentapetala
- Actinidia persicina
- Actinidia pilosula
- Actinidia polygama – silver vine
- Actinidia rongshuiensis
- Actinidia rubricaulis
  - A. rubricaulis var. coriacea – Chinese egg gooseberry
- Actinidia rubus
- Actinidia rudis
- Actinidia rufa
- Actinidia rufotricha
  - A. rufotricha var. glomerata
- Actinidia sabiifolia
- Actinidia sorbifolia
- Actinidia stellatopilosa
- Actinidia strigosa
- Actinidia styracifolia
- Actinidia suberifolia
- Actinidia tetramera
  - A. tetramera var. badongensis
- Actinidia trichogyna
- Actinidia ulmifolia
- Actinidia umbelloides
  - A. umbelloides var. flabellifolia
- Actinidia valvata
  - A. valvata var. boehmeriaefolia
  - A. valvata var. longipedicellata
- Actinidia venosa
  - A. venosa f. pubescens
- Actinidia vitifolia
- Actinidia zhejiangensis

=== Gallery ===
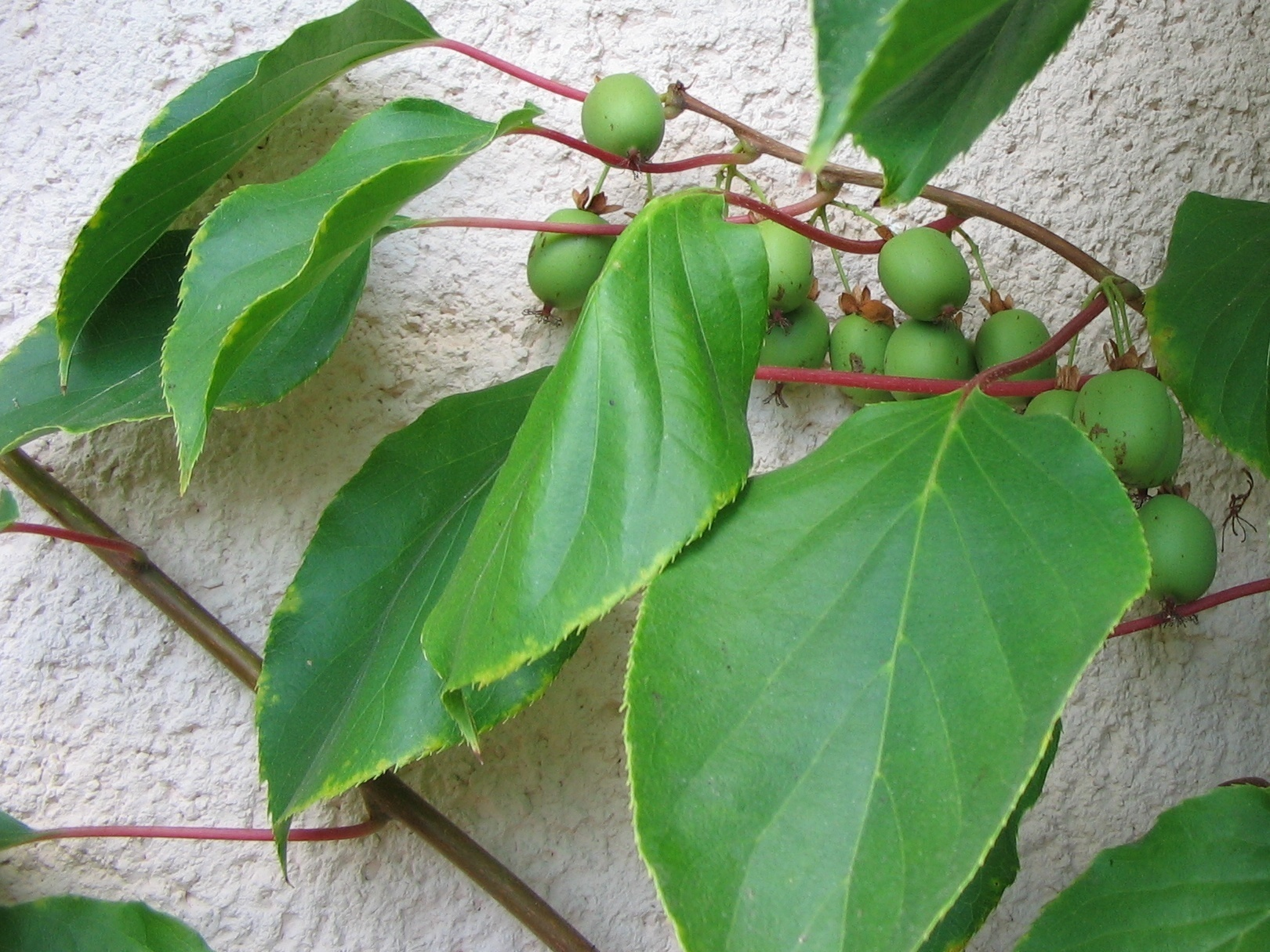
Actinidia arguta 'Weiki'

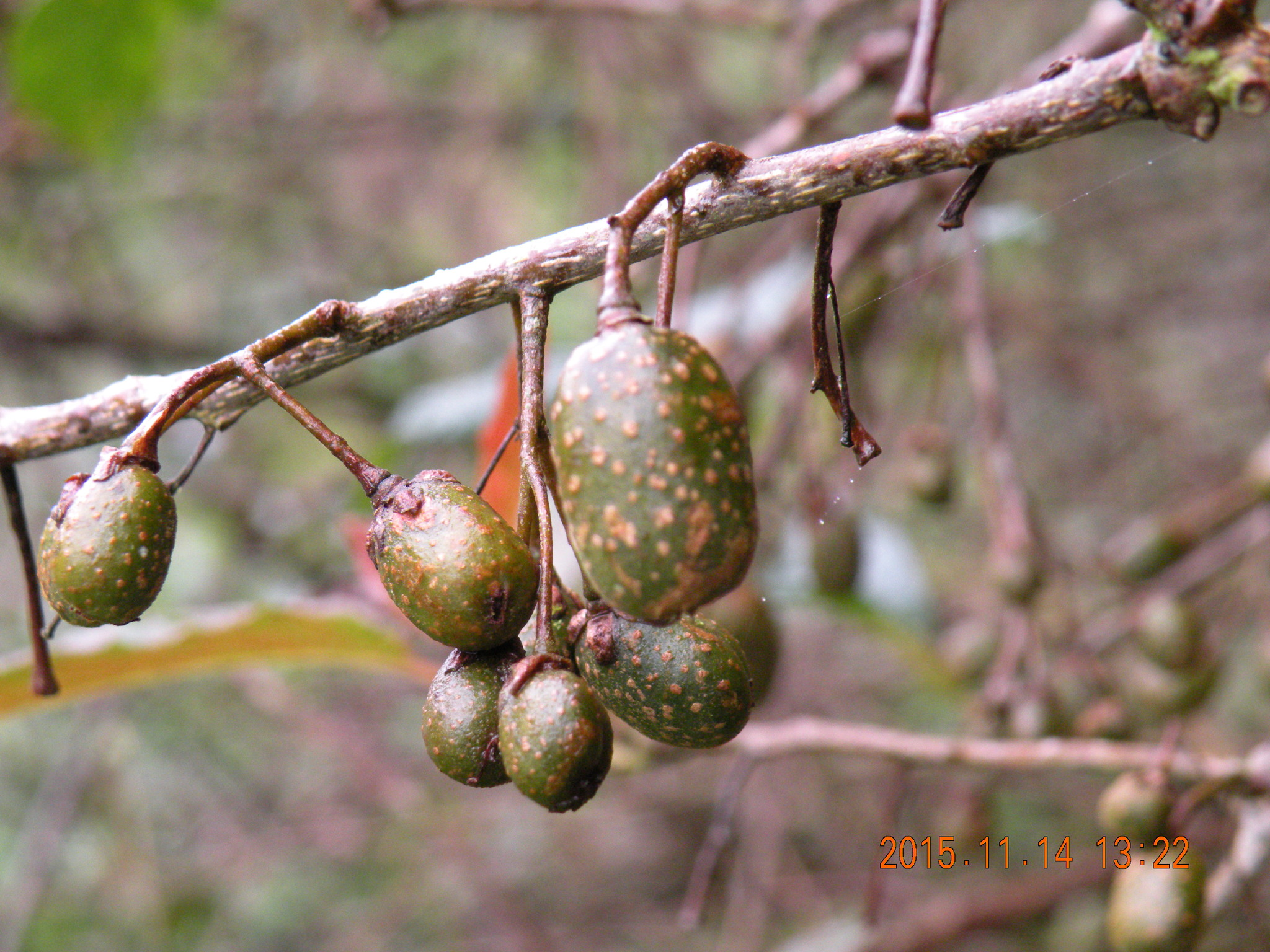
Actinidia callosa var. discolor

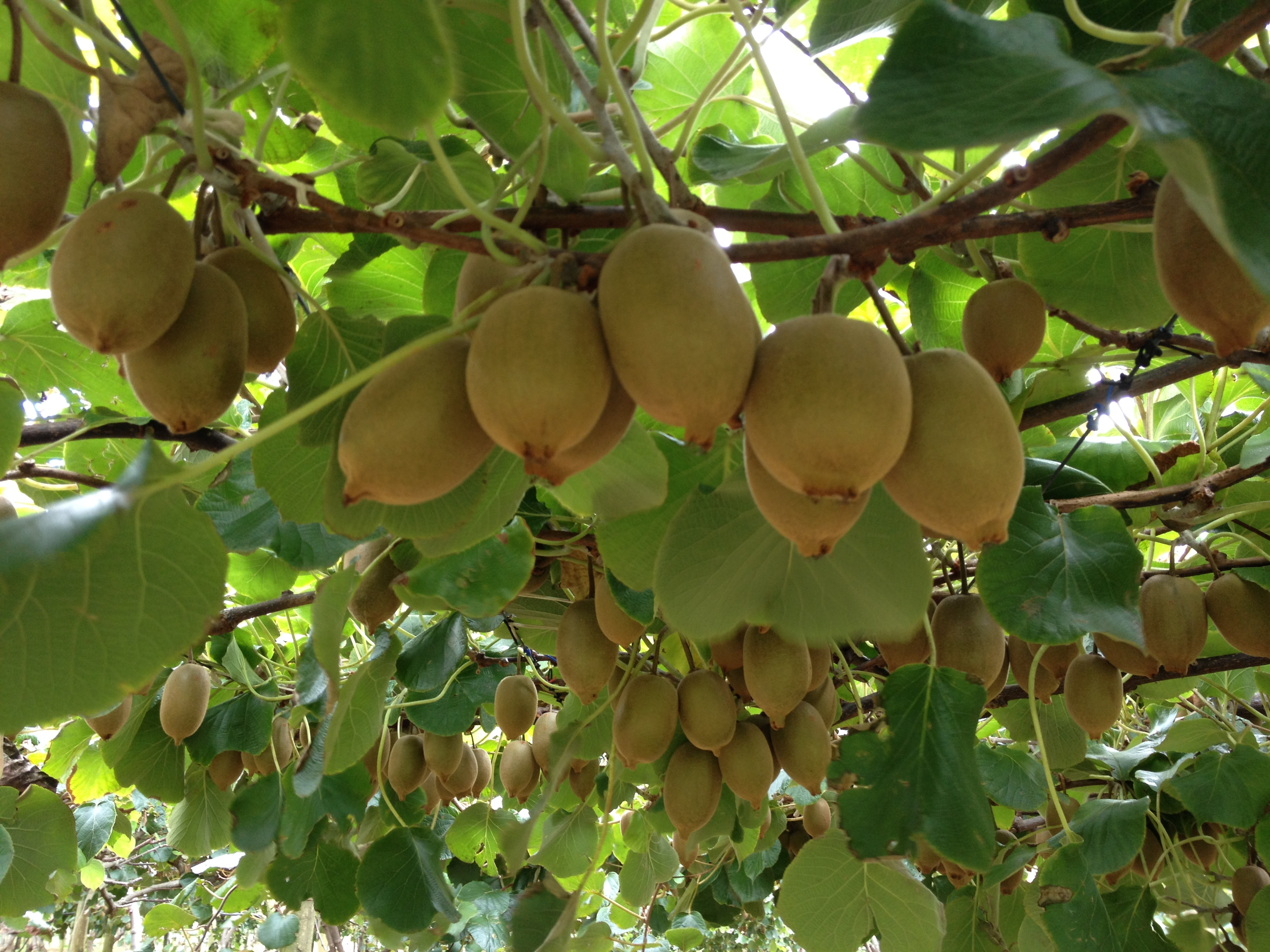
Actinidia chinensis var. chinensis

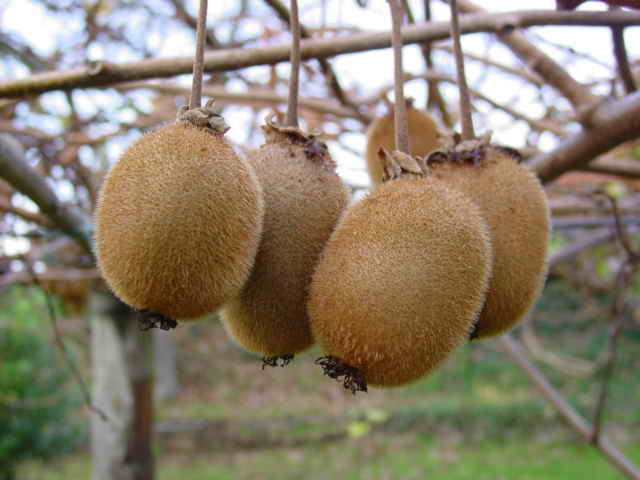
Actinidia chinensis var. deliciosa

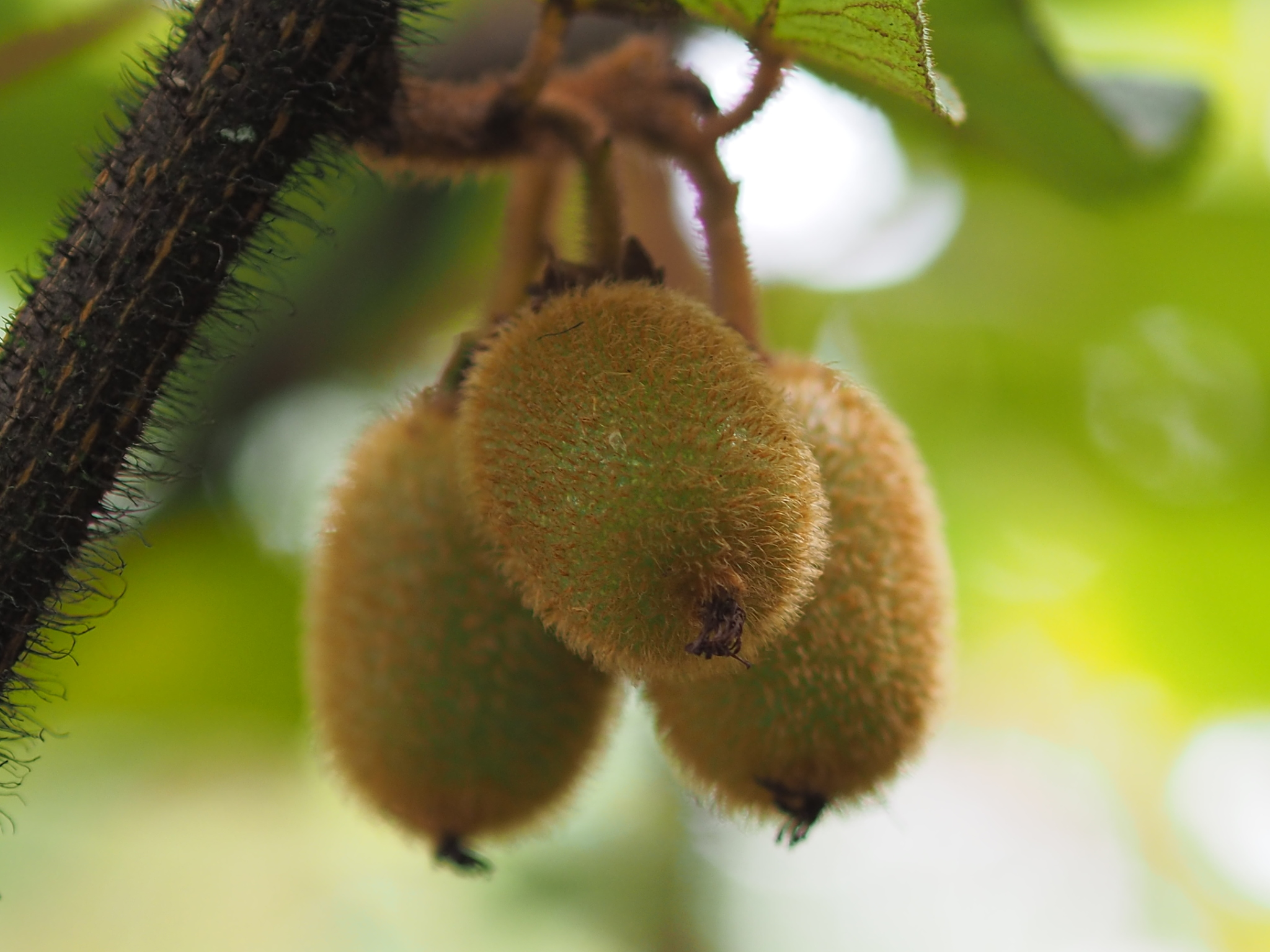
Actinidia chinensis var. setosa

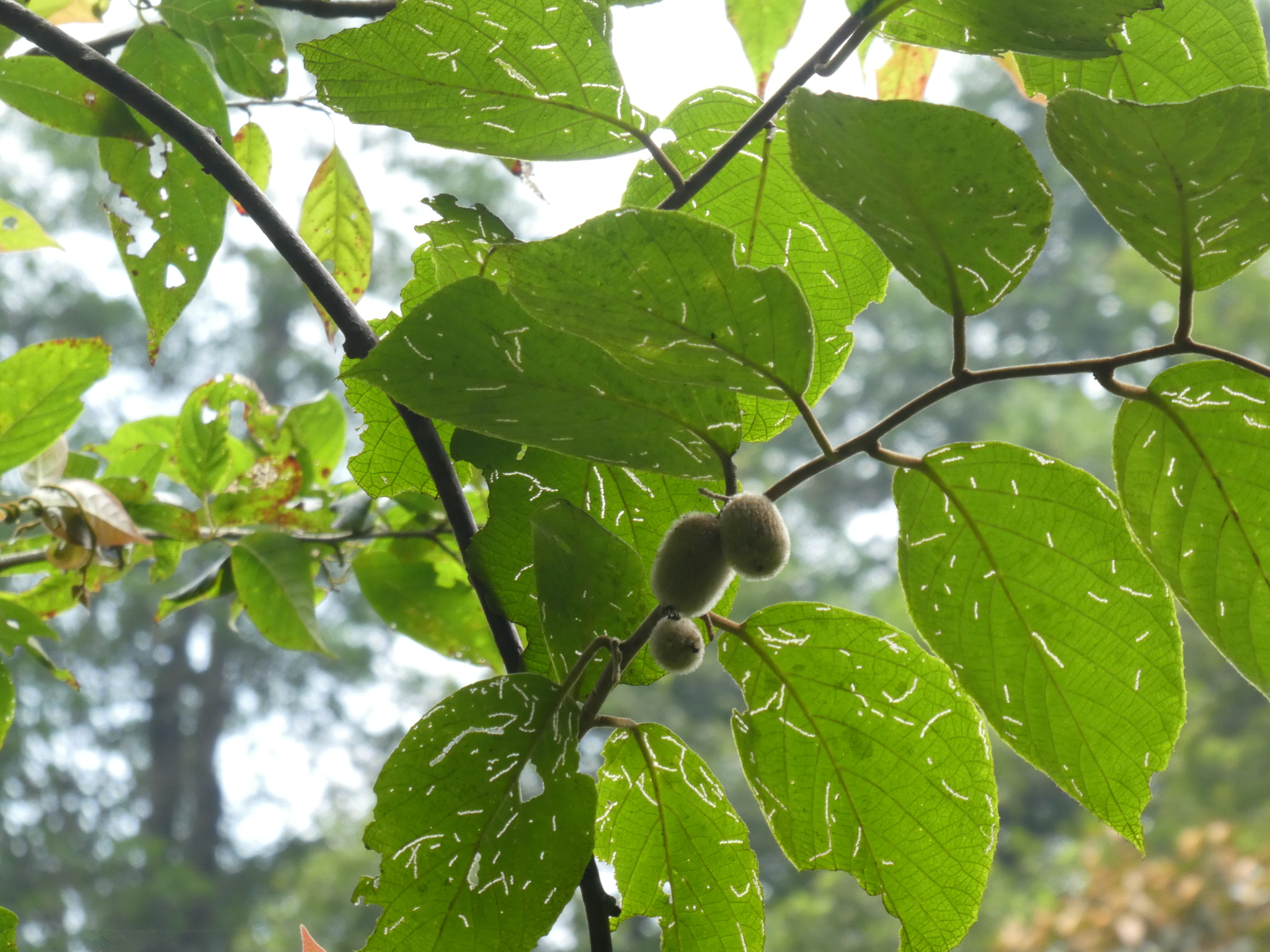
Actinidia eriantha

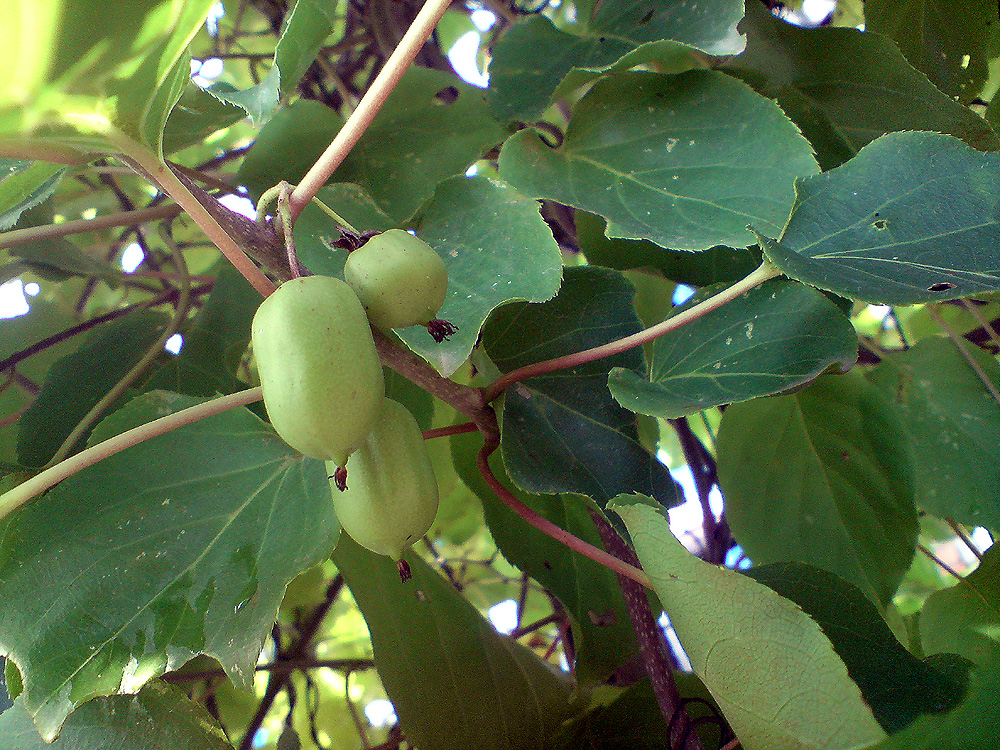
Actinidia kolomikta

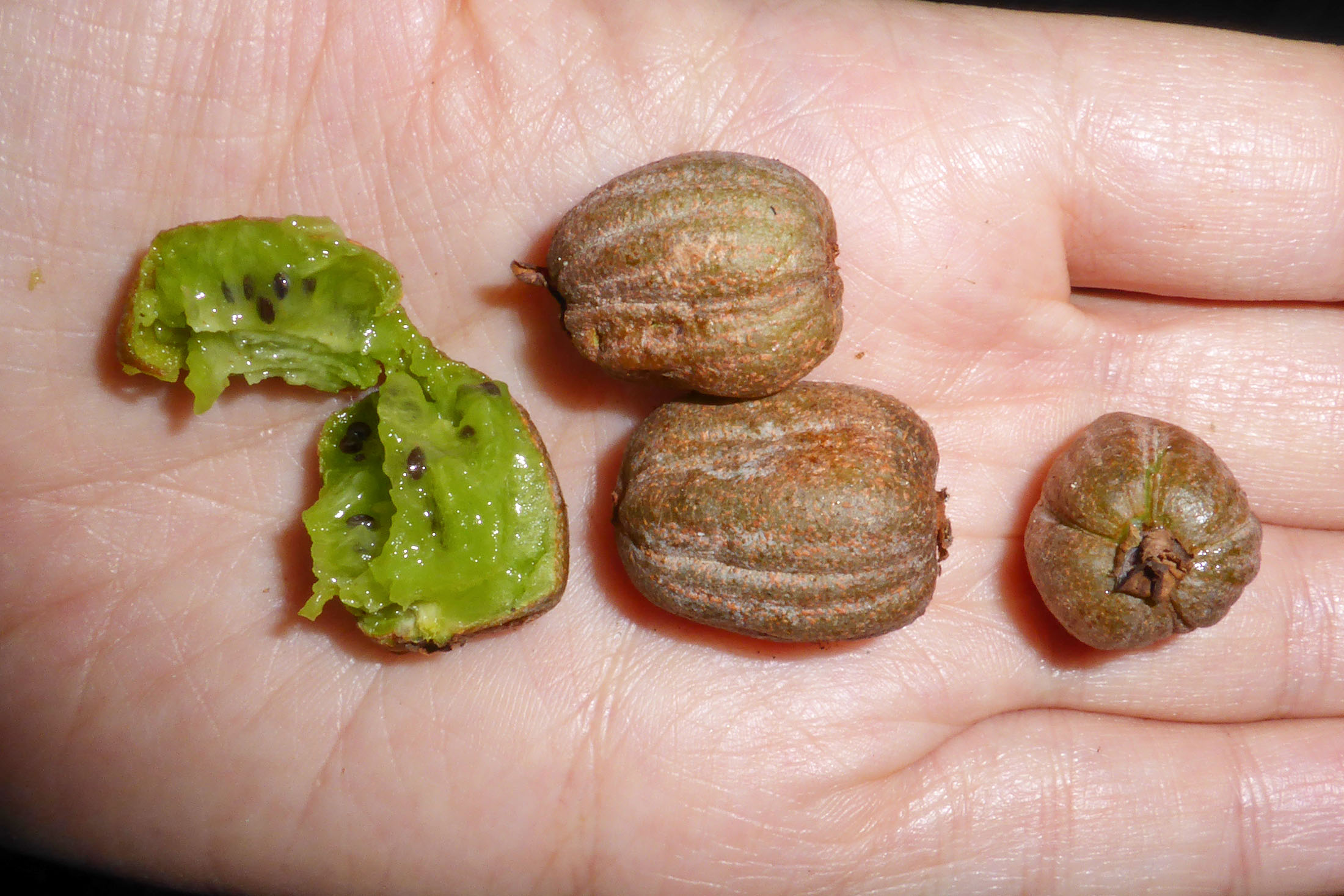
Actinidia latifolia

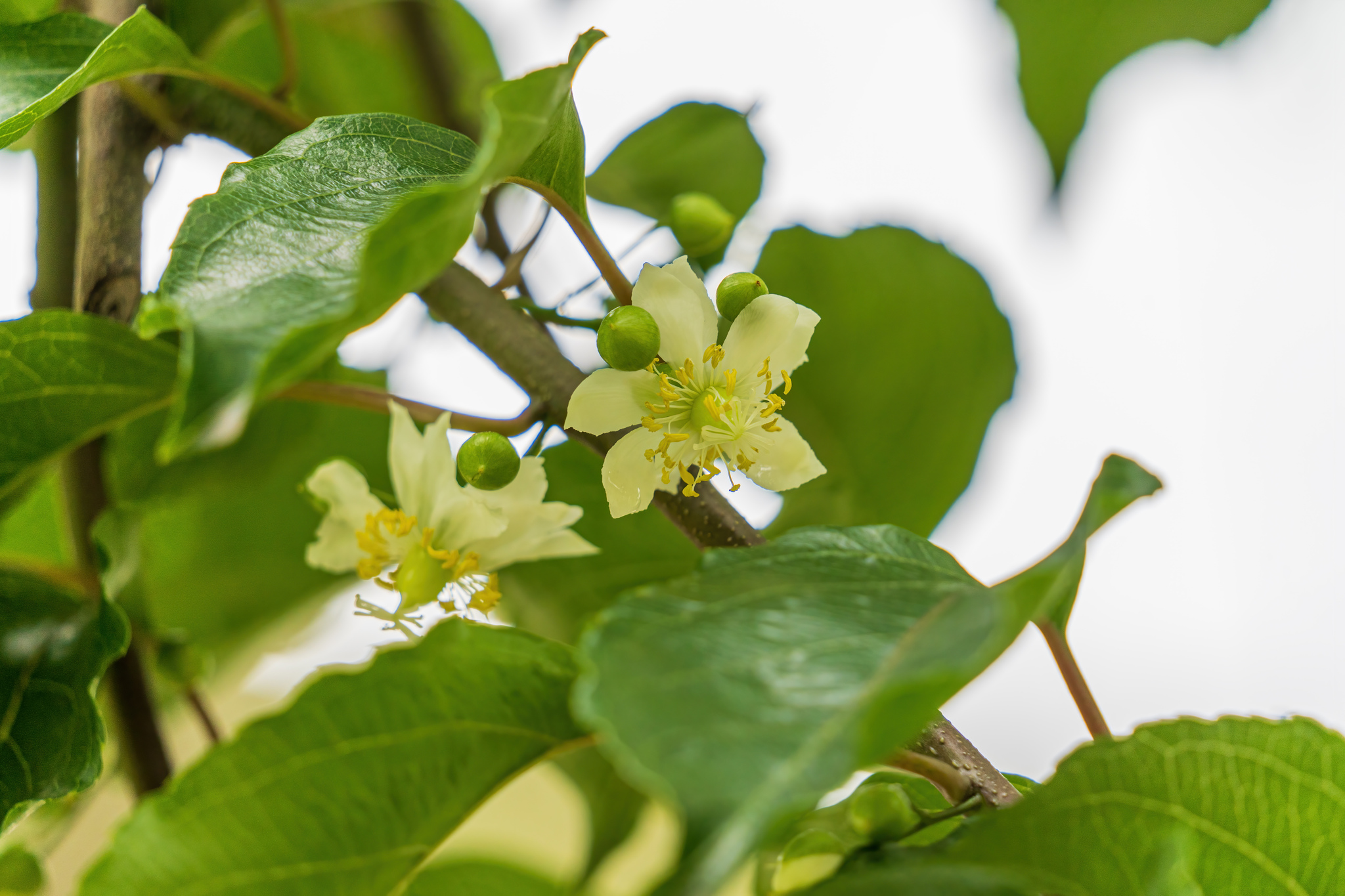
Actinidia macrosperma

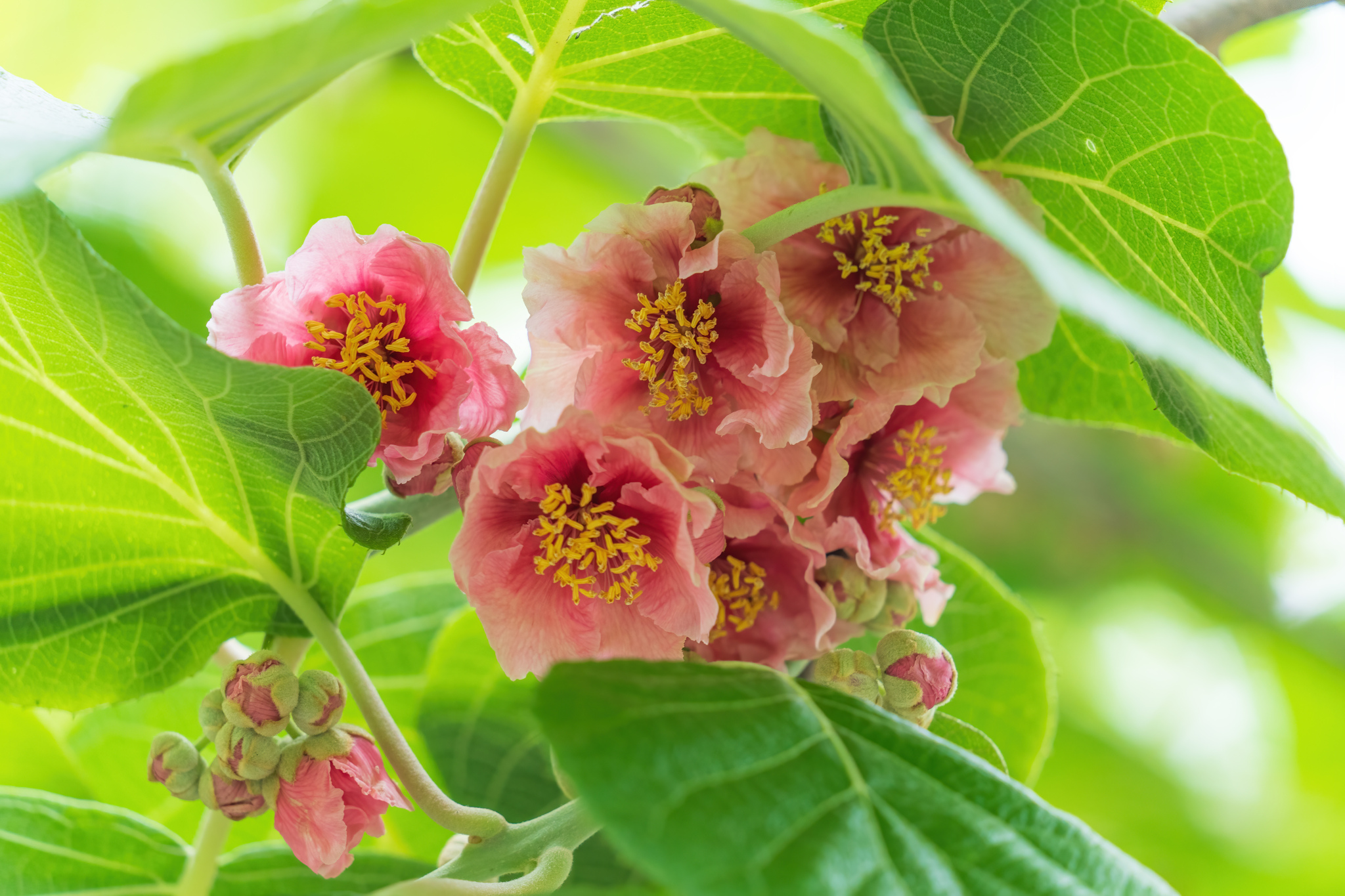
Actinidia persicina

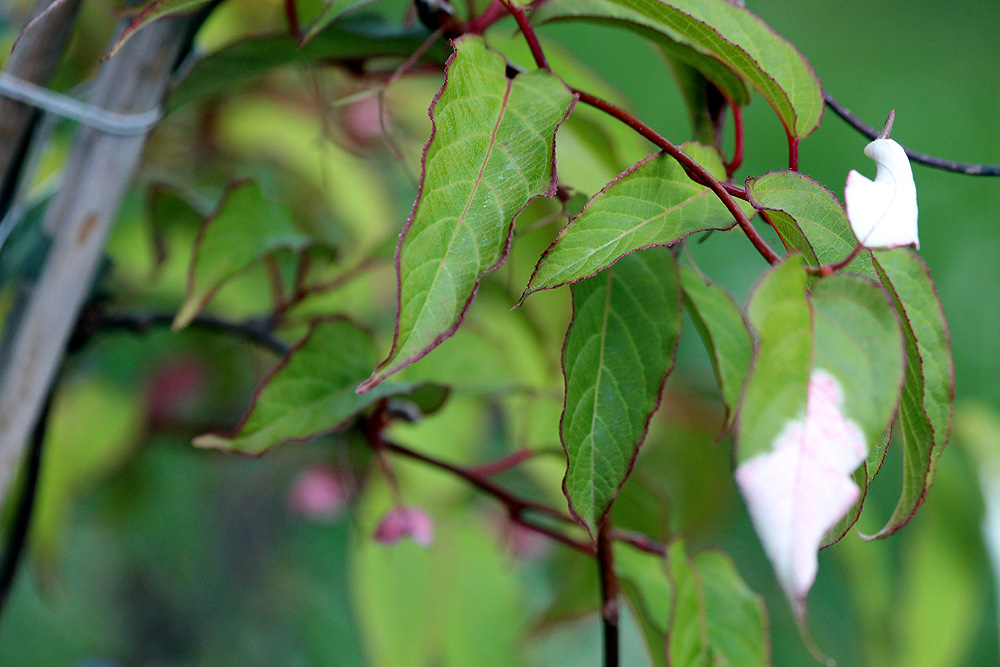
Actinidia pilosula

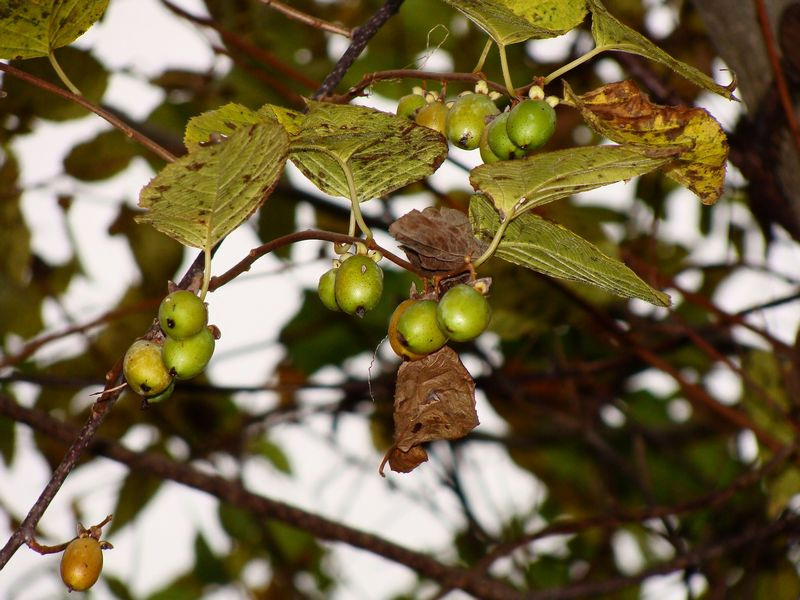
Actinidia polygama

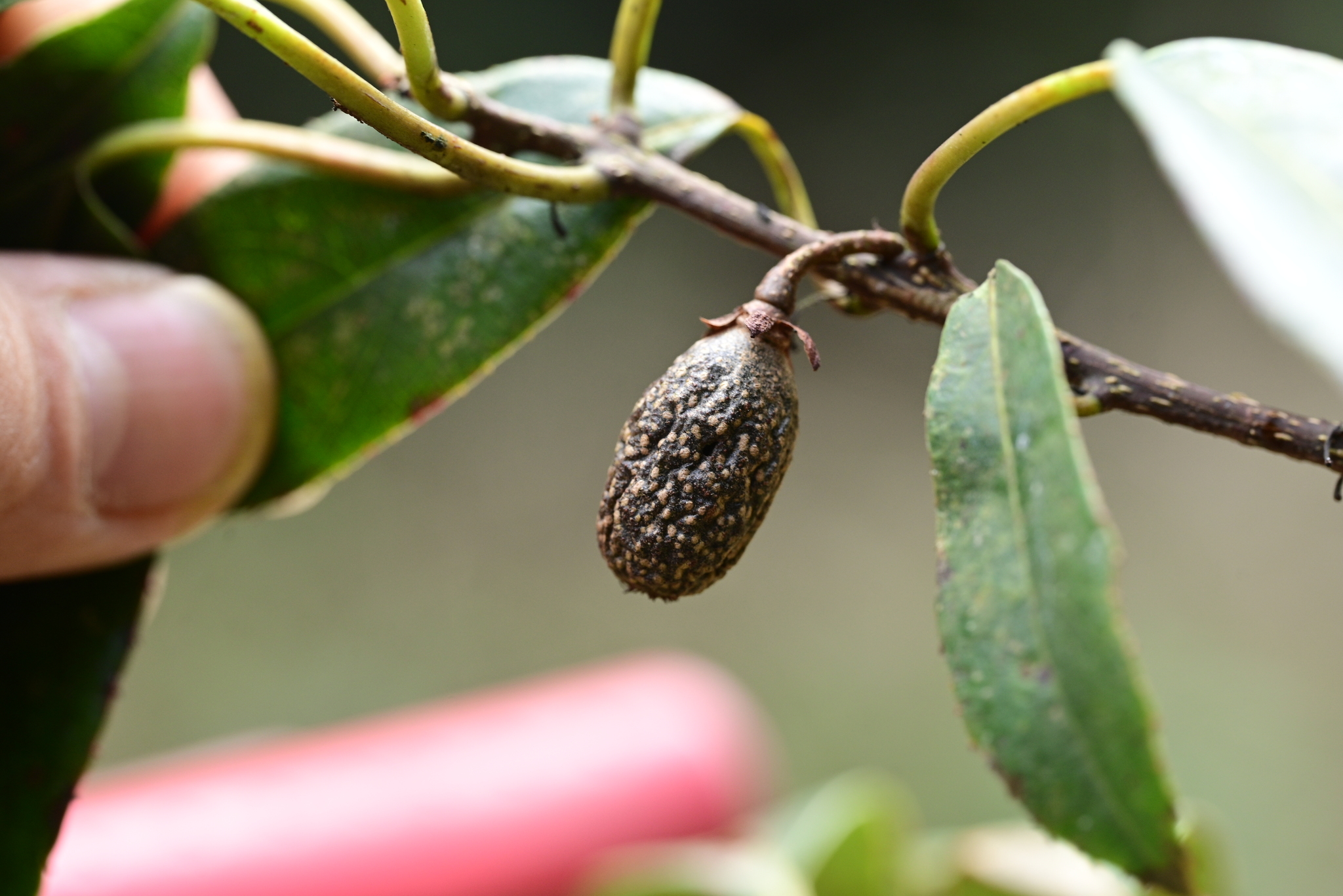
Actinidia rubricaulis var. coriacea

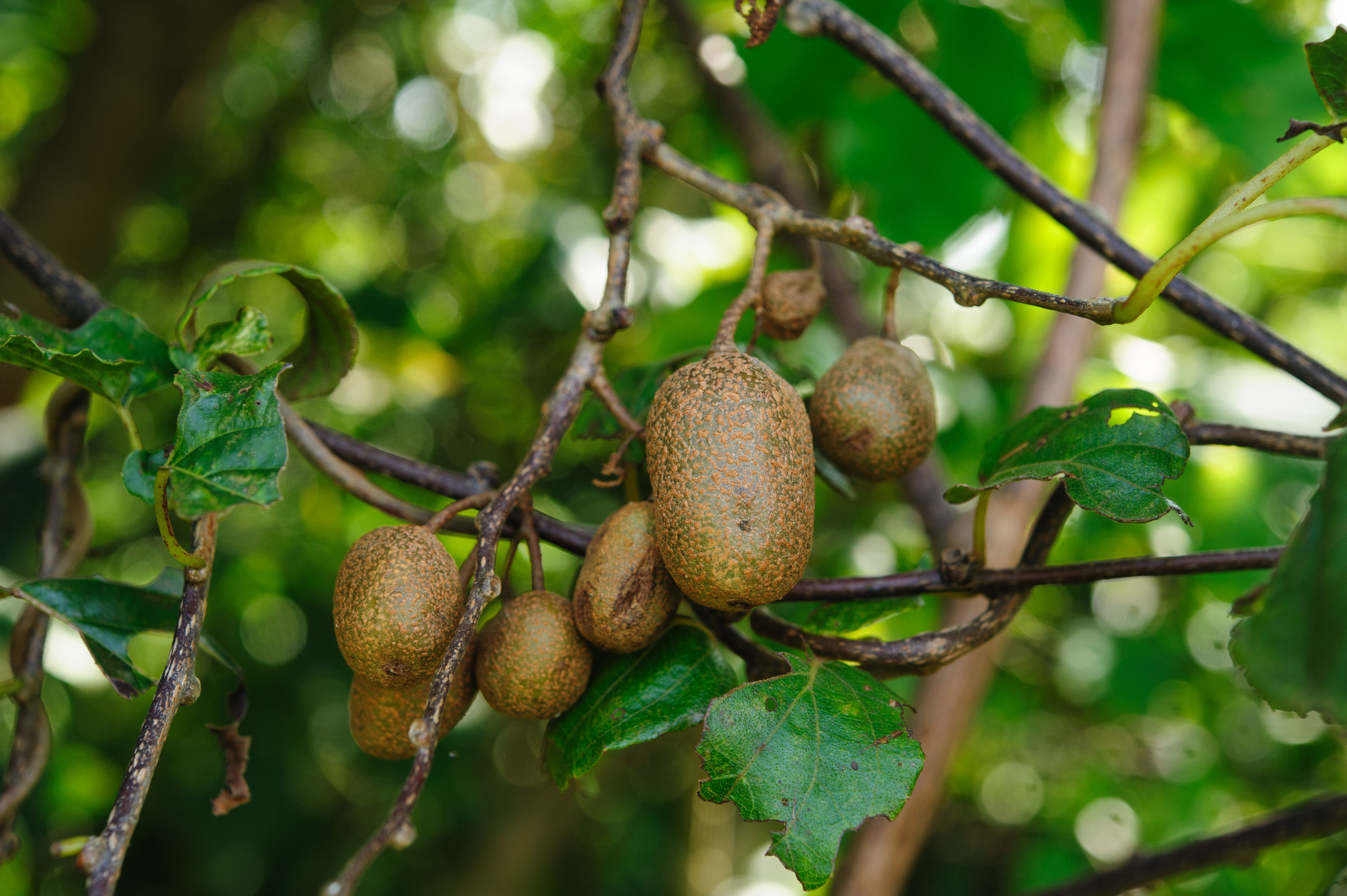
Actinidia rufa

== Uses ==
Kiwifruit is a cultivar group of A. chinesis, and hardy kiwi is the species Actinidia arguta, which has small fruit weighing 10–15 g (0.35–0.53 oz), with green edible skins and green flesh; it is hardier than A. chinensis. Some species are grown as ornamental plants, notably A. kolomikta.

In Japan, Actinidia polygama (silver vine) is noted for having an effect on cats much like that of catnip. It is mentioned in the saying 猫にまたたび、女郎に小判 (neko ni matatabi, jorō ni koban, "silver vine to a cat, a coin to a prostitute"), meaning to put someone in a good mood by providing that which they most desire.

A. kolomikta is the hardiest species (to about −40 °C or −40 °F), and has distinctive white- and pink-variegated foliage even on wild plants, an unusual phenomenon. Its fruit is very small, weighing 8 g (0.28 oz) or less.

== Etymology ==
Actinidia is derived from Ancient Greek ἀκτῑ́ς 'ray', and is a reference to the rayed styles of the flowers.
