= Actinidia stellatopilosa =

Conservation status
- Endangered (IUCN 3.1)

Scientific classification
- Kingdom: Plantae
- Clade: Tracheophytes
- Clade: Angiosperms
- Clade: Eudicots
- Clade: Asterids
- Order: Ericales
- Family: Actinidiaceae
- Genus: Actinidia
- Species: A. stellatopilosa

Binomial name
- Actinidia stellatopilosa C.Y.Chang

Species of vine

Actinidia stellatopilosa is a species of plant in the family Actinidiaceae. It is endemic to China.
