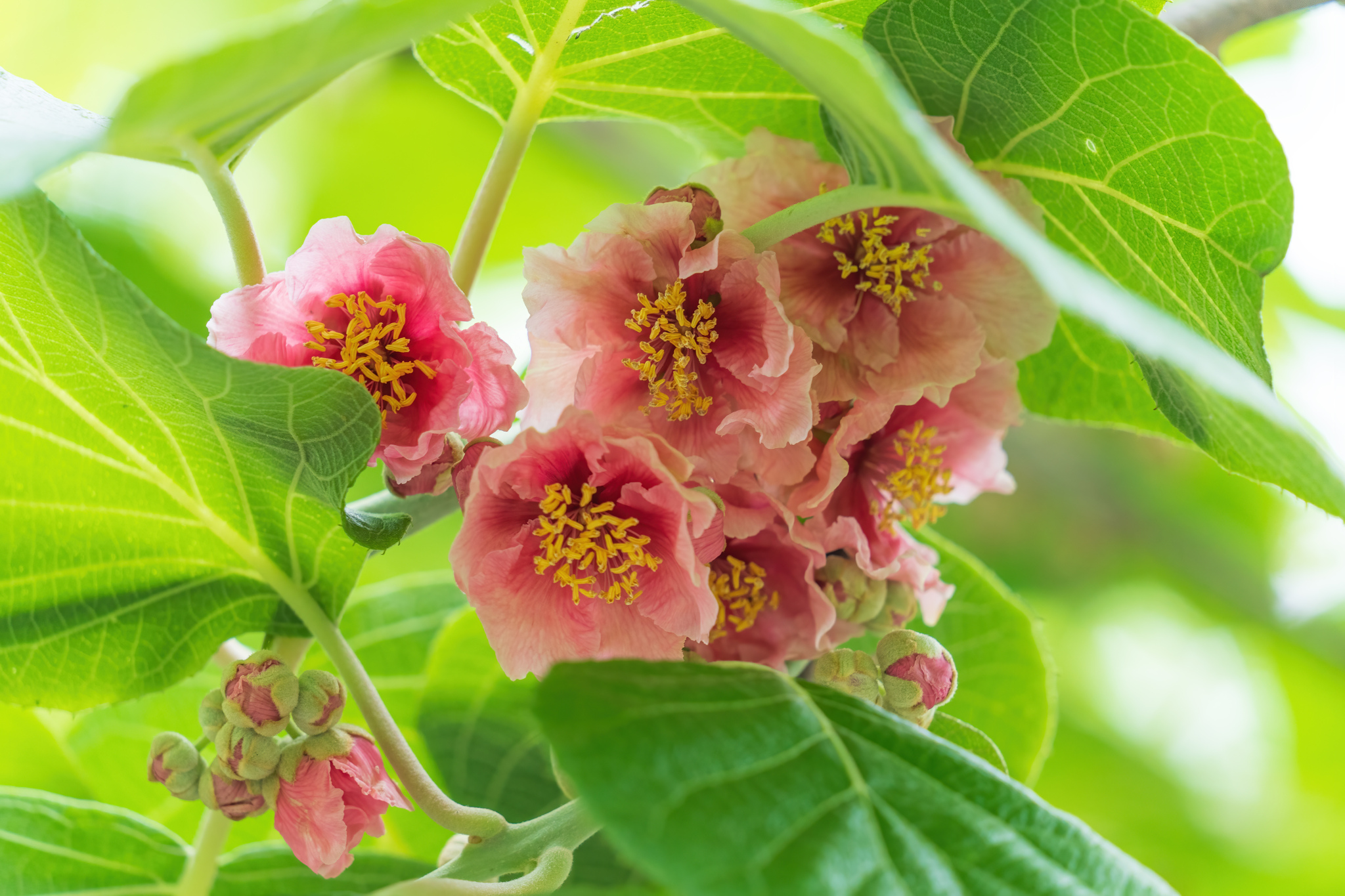

Scientific classification
- Kingdom: Plantae
- Clade: Tracheophytes
- Clade: Angiosperms
- Clade: Eudicots
- Clade: Asterids
- Order: Ericales
- Family: Actinidiaceae
- Genus: Actinidia
- Species: A. persicina

Binomial name
- Actinidia persicina R.G.Li & L.Mo

= Actinidia persicina =

Species of vine

Actinidia persicina is a species of plant in the Actinidiaceae family. It is found in southeastern China. In Chinese, the plant is known as táohuā míhóutáo (Chinese: 桃花猕猴桃; trans. "peach blossom kiwifruit").

== Taxonomy ==
The species was first described in 2003 by Rui Gao Li and Mo Ling. As the researchers had not specified a type specimen, the species was resdribed formally in 2007.

== Description ==
Actinidia persicina is a climbing shrub with pink flowers.

== Distribution and habitat ==
The species is known to grow in the Rongshui Miao Autonomous County, and has been grown at the Guangxi Institute of Botany since 1992. The species primarily grows in subtropical areas.
