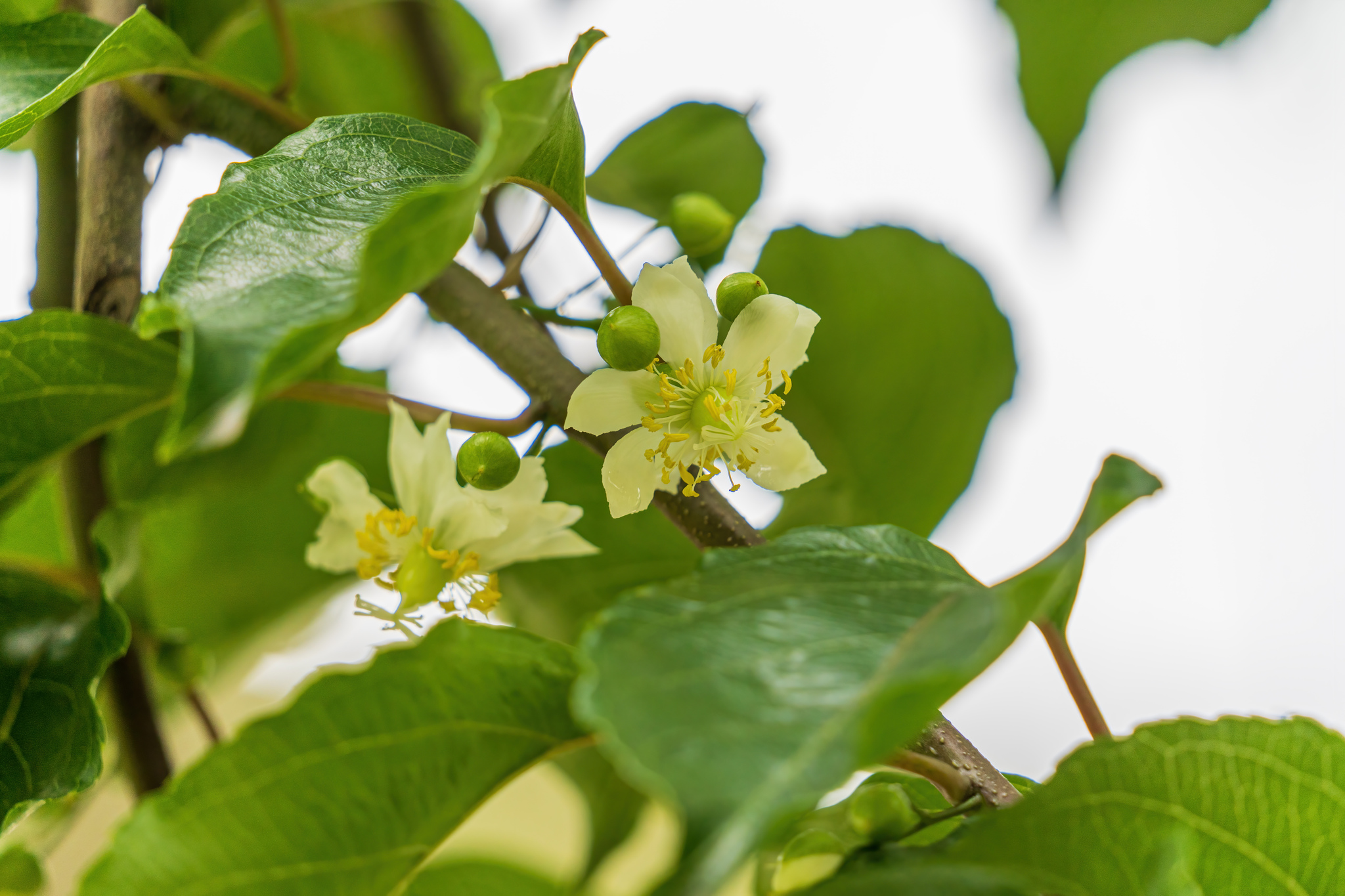
- At the Wuhan Botanical Garden

Scientific classification
- Kingdom: Plantae
- Clade: Tracheophytes
- Clade: Angiosperms
- Clade: Eudicots
- Clade: Asterids
- Order: Ericales
- Family: Actinidiaceae
- Genus: Actinidia
- Species: A. macrosperma

Binomial name
- Actinidia macrosperma C.F.Liang

= Actinidia macrosperma =

Species of vine

Actinidia macrosperma is a species of plant in the Actinidiaceae family. It is found across southeastern China, as far north as Hubei.

== Subspecies ==
Actinidia macrosperma var. mumoides is a subspecies of the plant, found in southeastern China.

== Habitat ==
The species primarily grows in temperate areas.

== Gallery ==
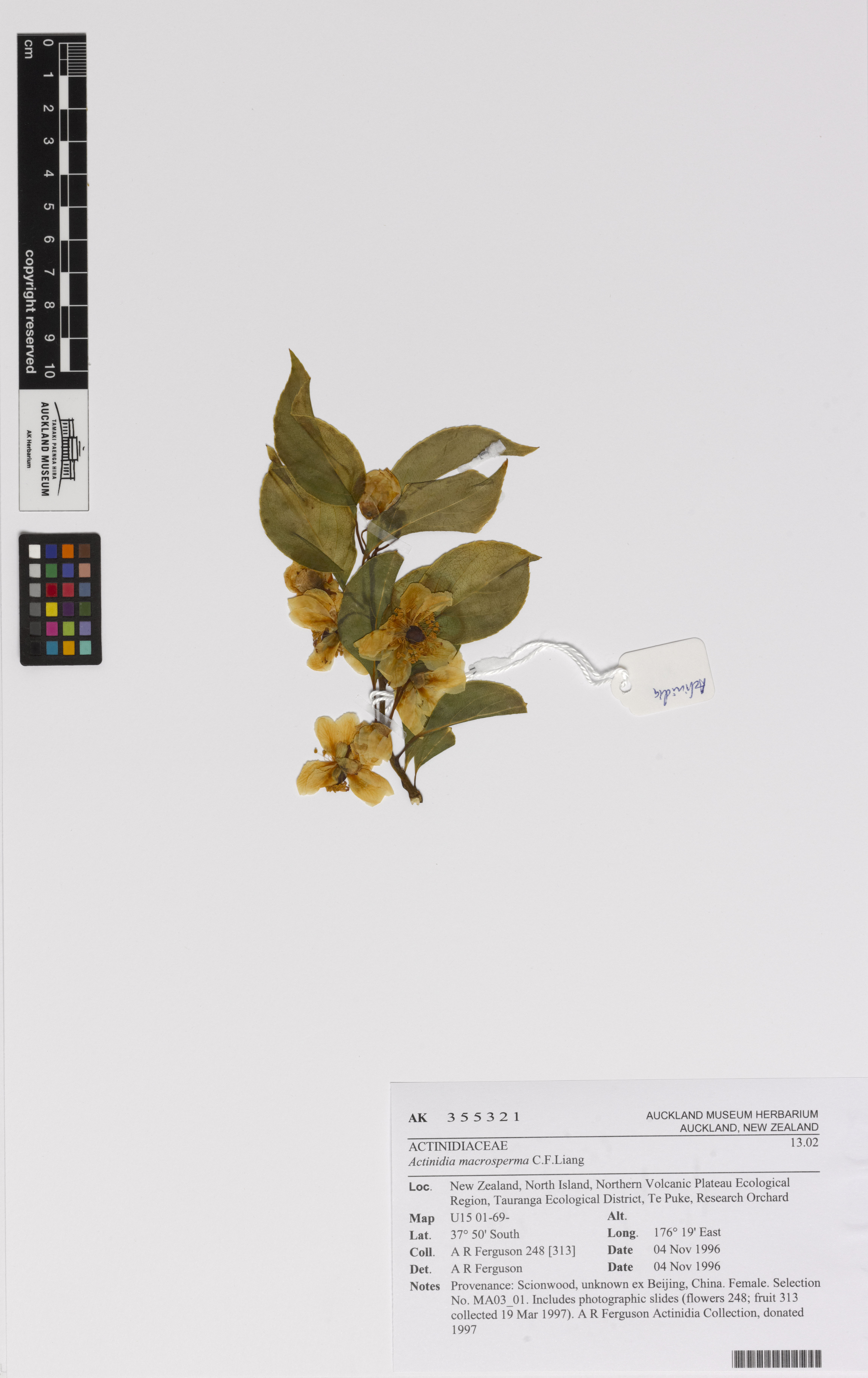
Herbarium specimen

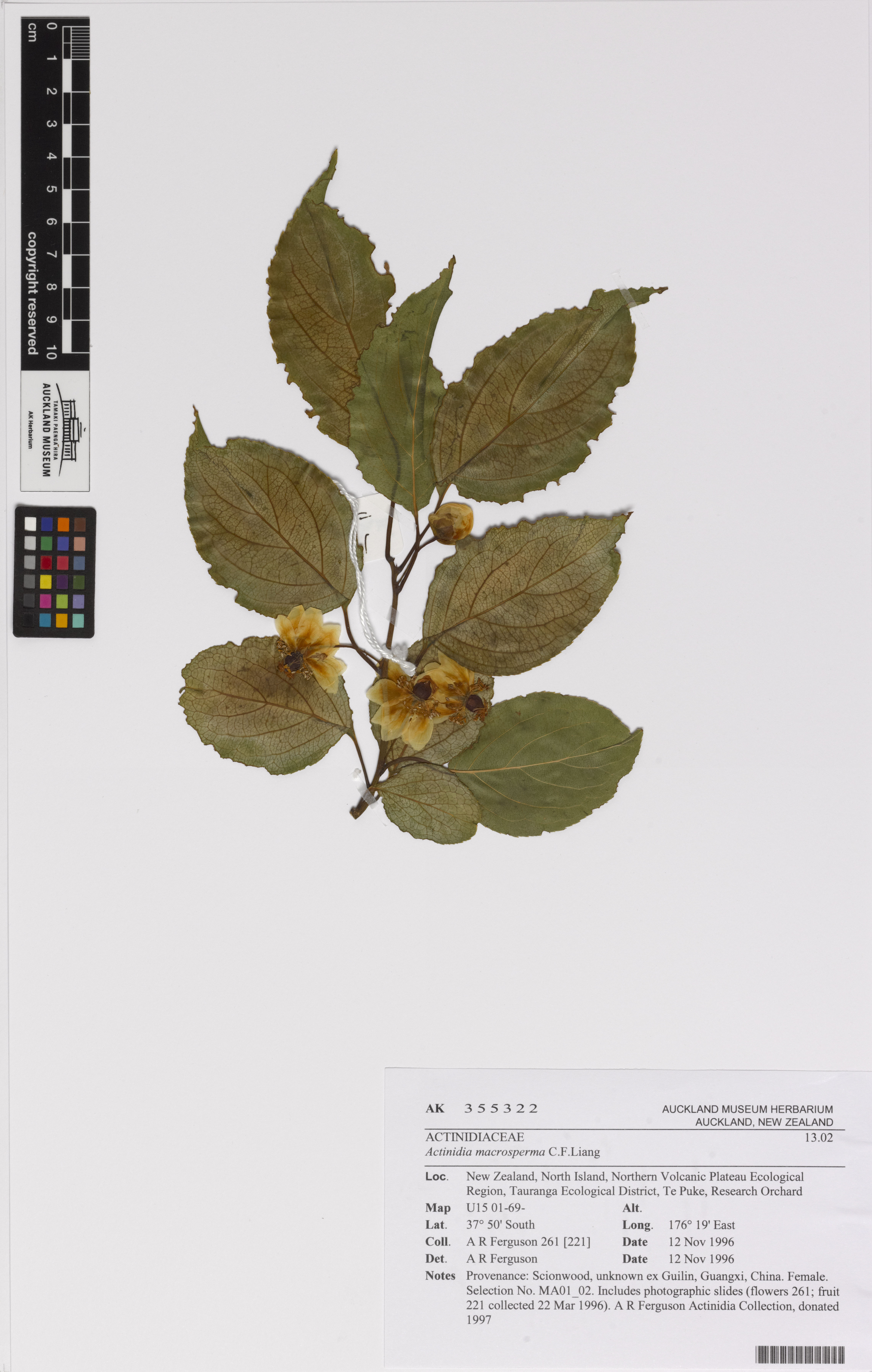
Herbarium specimen
