= Actinidia faveolata =

Actinidia faveolata Temporal range: Upper Oligocene - Upper Pleistocene, 28.1–1 Mya

Scientific classification
- Kingdom: Plantae
- Clade: Embryophytes
- Clade: Tracheophytes
- Clade: Angiosperms
- Clade: Eudicots
- Clade: Asterids
- Order: Ericales
- Family: Actinidiaceae
- Genus: Actinidia
- Species: A. faveolata

Binomial name
- Actinidia faveolata C.Reid and E.M.Reid

Extinct species of vine

Actinidia faveolata is an extinct species in the kiwifruit genus, Actinidia.

== Fossil record ==
Fossil pollen of Actinidia faveolata have been recovered from early Pleistocene sediments in Ludham east of Wroxham, East Anglia. Actinidia faveolata was then part of a plant community in Ludham of many exotic and among them now many extinct species such as: Eucommia europaea, Phellodendron elegans (extinct cork-tree), Menispermum dahuricum (extinct moonseed), Magnolia kobus (the Kobushi magnolia), Physalis alkekengi (bladder cherry), Decodon globosus (extinct waterwillow), Corema intermedia (extinct broom crowberry), and Laserpitium siler (laserwort). A seed fragment of Actinidia faveolata, was found in Pleistocene fluvial sediments, which form part of the Cromer Forest-bed Formation, below the modern beach southeast of Happisburgh, Norfolk, UK. Previously, remains of this extinct species have been found in Upper Oligocene sediments from West Siberia and from Miocene, Pliocene and Early Pleistocene sediments in Europe among else from sediments in the southwest of the Netherlands.
