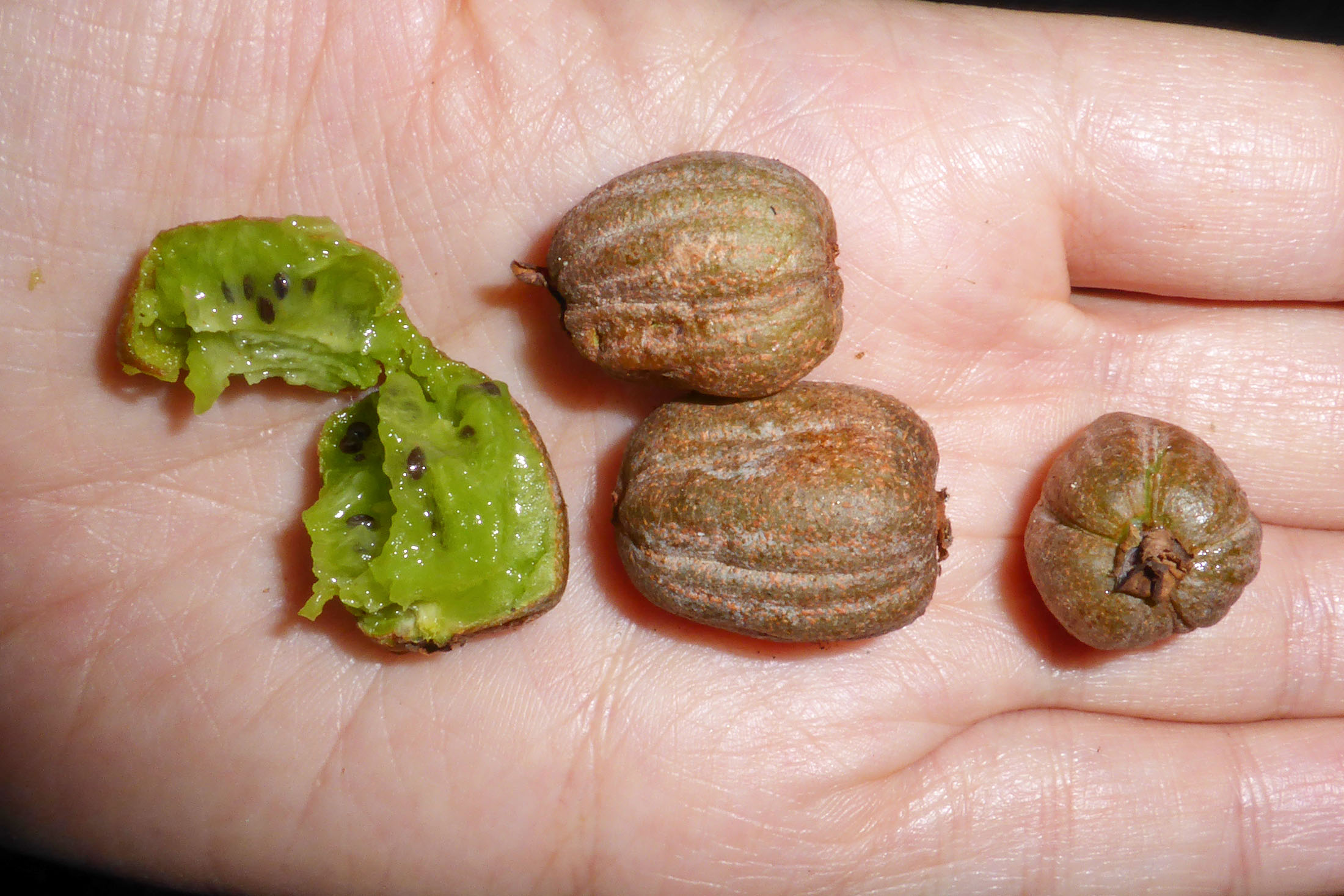

Scientific classification
- Kingdom: Plantae
- Clade: Tracheophytes
- Clade: Angiosperms
- Clade: Eudicots
- Clade: Asterids
- Order: Ericales
- Family: Actinidiaceae
- Genus: Actinidia
- Species: A. latifolia

Binomial name
- Actinidia latifolia (Gardn. et Champ.) Merr.

= Actinidia latifolia =

Species of vine

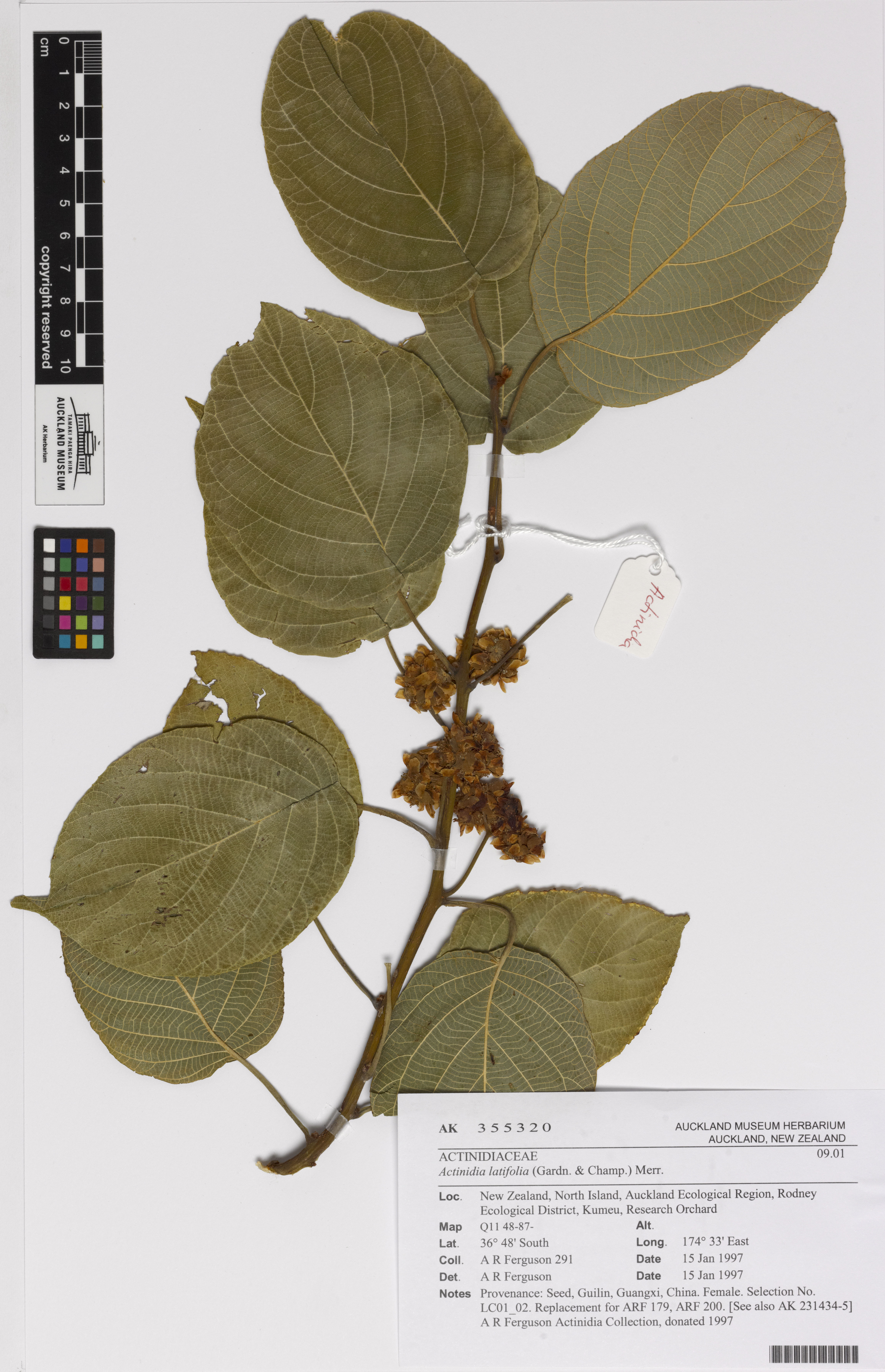
Herbarium spedimen of Actinidia latifolia

Actinidia latifolia is a species of plant in the Actinidiaceae family. It is found across southeastern China, southeast Asia and Taiwan.

== Habitat ==
The species primarily grows in high humidity tropical areas.

== Subspecies ==
Actinidia latifolia var. mollis is a subspecies of the plant. Endemic to Southwestern China and primarily found near Yunnan, the species primarily grows in subtropical areas.
