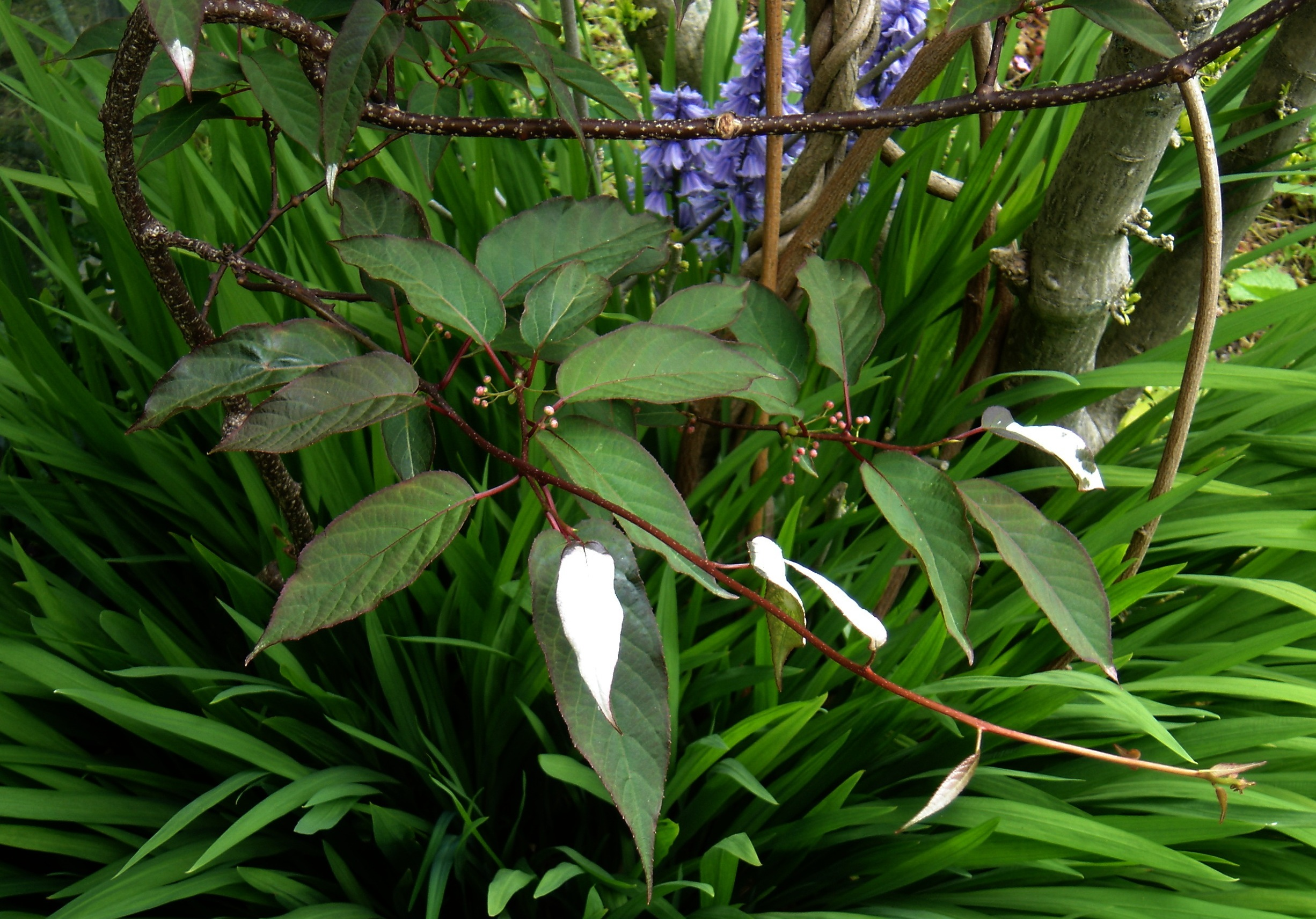

Conservation status
- Vulnerable (IUCN 3.1)

Scientific classification
- Kingdom: Plantae
- Clade: Tracheophytes
- Clade: Angiosperms
- Clade: Eudicots
- Clade: Asterids
- Order: Ericales
- Family: Actinidiaceae
- Genus: Actinidia
- Species: A. pilosula

Binomial name
- Actinidia pilosula (Finet & Gagnep.) Stapf ex Hand.-Mazz.

Synonyms
- Actinidia callosa var. pilosula Finet & Gagnep.; Actinidia kungshanensis C.Y.Wu & S.K.Chen

= Actinidia pilosula =

Species of vine

Actinidia pilosula is a plant species in the Actinidiaceae family. It is a shrub endemic to Yunnan province in south-central China. The Tibetan people of Shangri-La and nearby areas eat its fruit.
