= Actinidia valvata =

Scientific classification
- Kingdom: Plantae
- Clade: Tracheophytes
- Clade: Angiosperms
- Clade: Eudicots
- Clade: Asterids
- Order: Ericales
- Family: Actinidiaceae
- Genus: Actinidia
- Species: A. valvata

Binomial name
- Actinidia valvata Dunn

Synonyms
- Actinidia valvata var. boehmeriifolia C.F.Liang; Actinidia valvata var. longipedicellata L.L.Yu

Species of plant

Actinidia valvata is a species of flowering plant in the Chinese gooseberry family Actinidiaceae, native to southern China. A deciduous climbing shrub, it is found in open woodlands and in thickets, preferring mountain valley bottoms, around 1,000 m (3,300 ft) above sea level. As a crop wild relative of kiwifruit, it is being studied for its resistance to waterlogging, with an eye towards using it as a rootstock.
