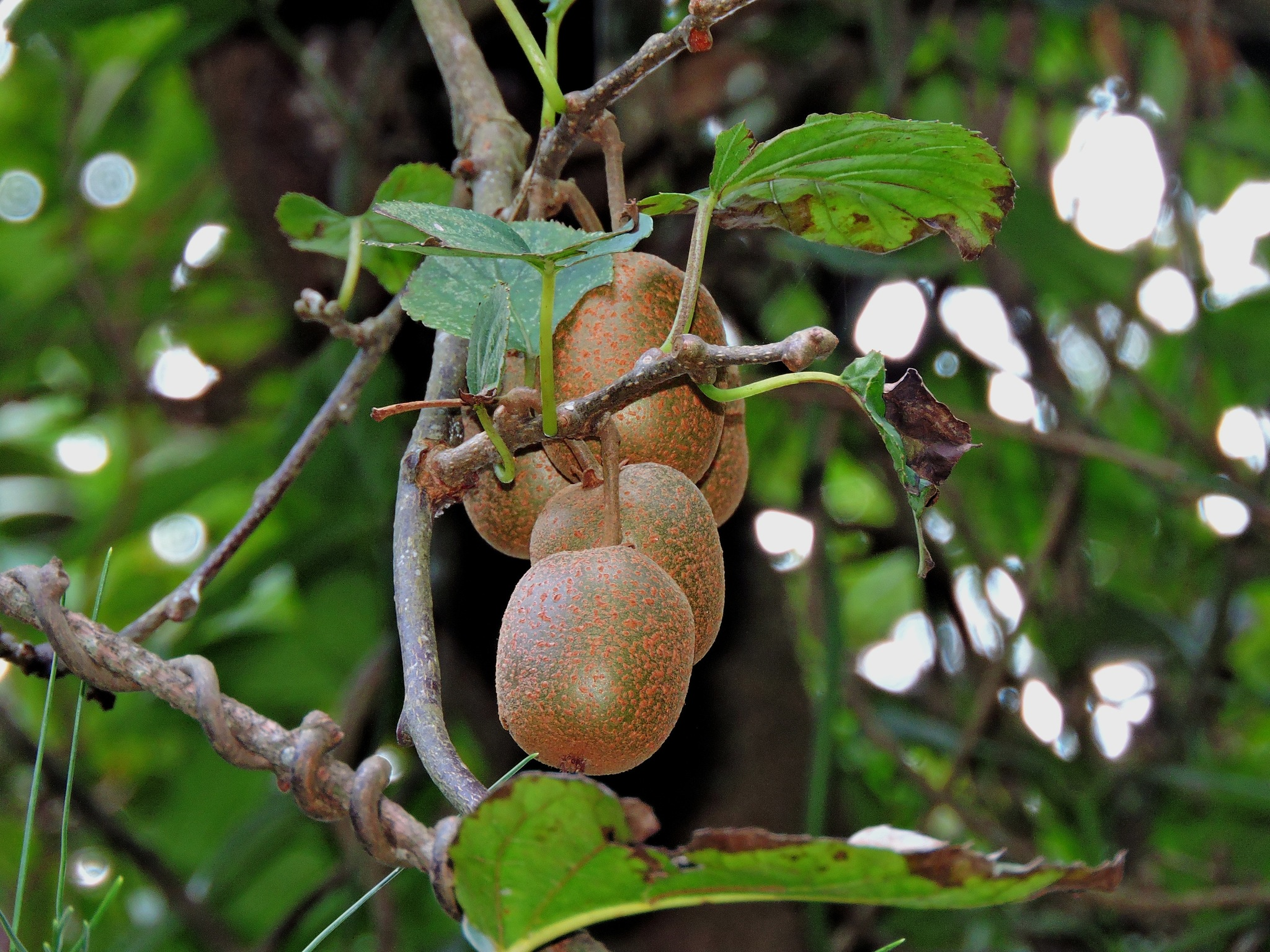

Scientific classification
- Kingdom: Plantae
- Clade: Tracheophytes
- Clade: Angiosperms
- Clade: Eudicots
- Clade: Asterids
- Order: Ericales
- Family: Actinidiaceae
- Genus: Actinidia
- Species: A. rufa

Binomial name
- Actinidia rufa (Siebold & Zucc.) Planch. ex Miq.

Synonyms
- Actinidia arguta var. rufa (Siebold & Zucc.) Maxim.; Actinidia callosa var. rufa (Siebold & Zucc.) Makino; Actinidia kiusiana Koidz.; Actinidia rufa var. typica Dunn; Trochostigma rufum Siebold & Zucc.

= Actinidia rufa =

Species of plant

Actinidia rufa is a species of flowering plant in the Chinese gooseberry family Actinidiaceae, native to Taiwan, some of the southwestern South Korean islands, the Ryukyu Islands, and southern and south-central Japan. A large climbing shrub, it is found in mountain forests at elevations from 1,000 to 2,000 m (3,300 to 6,600 ft). As a crop wild relative of kiwifruit, it is being studied for its resistance to frost and to bacterial canker of kiwifruit.

== Gallery ==
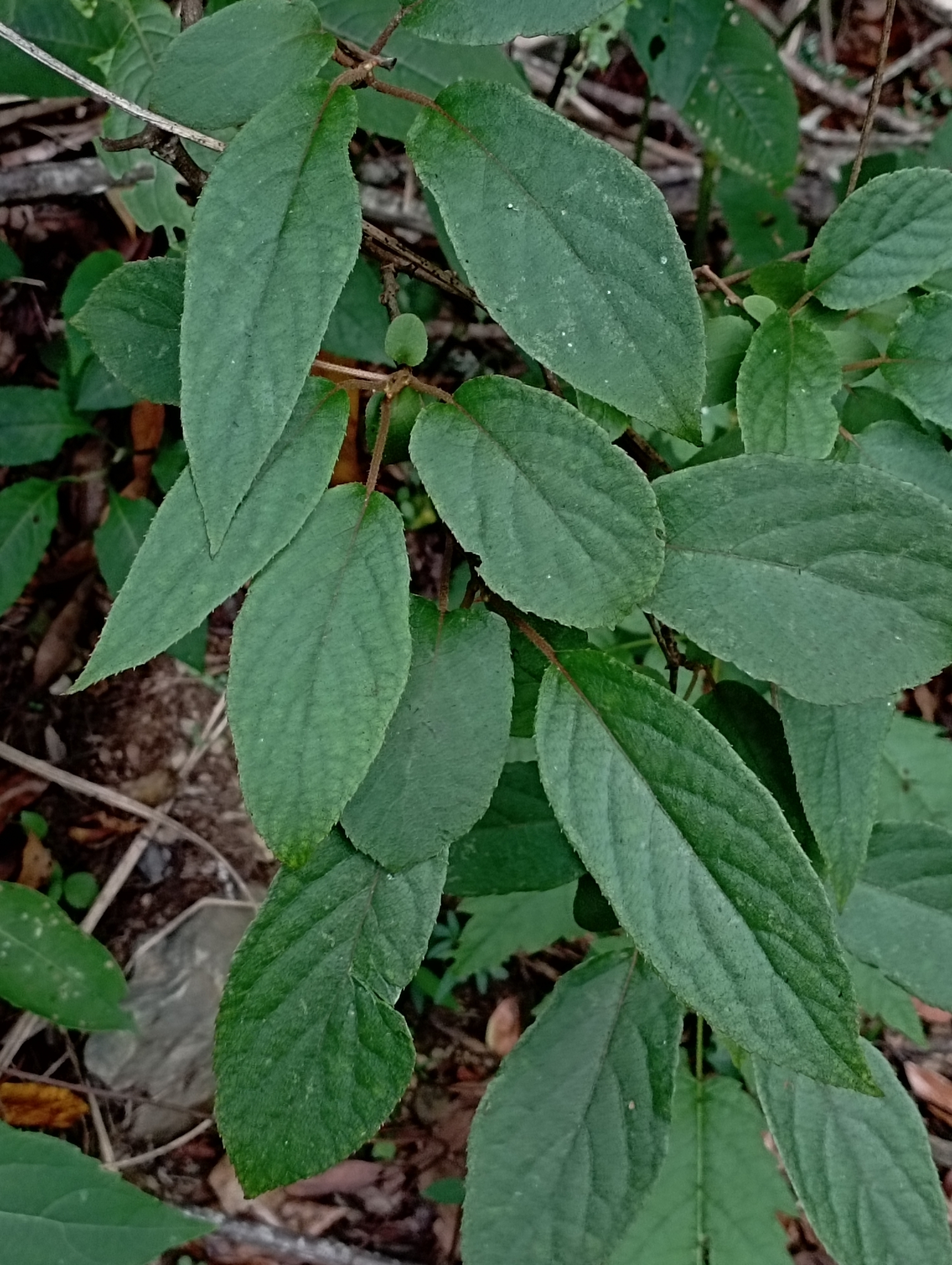
Leaves of Actinidia rufa

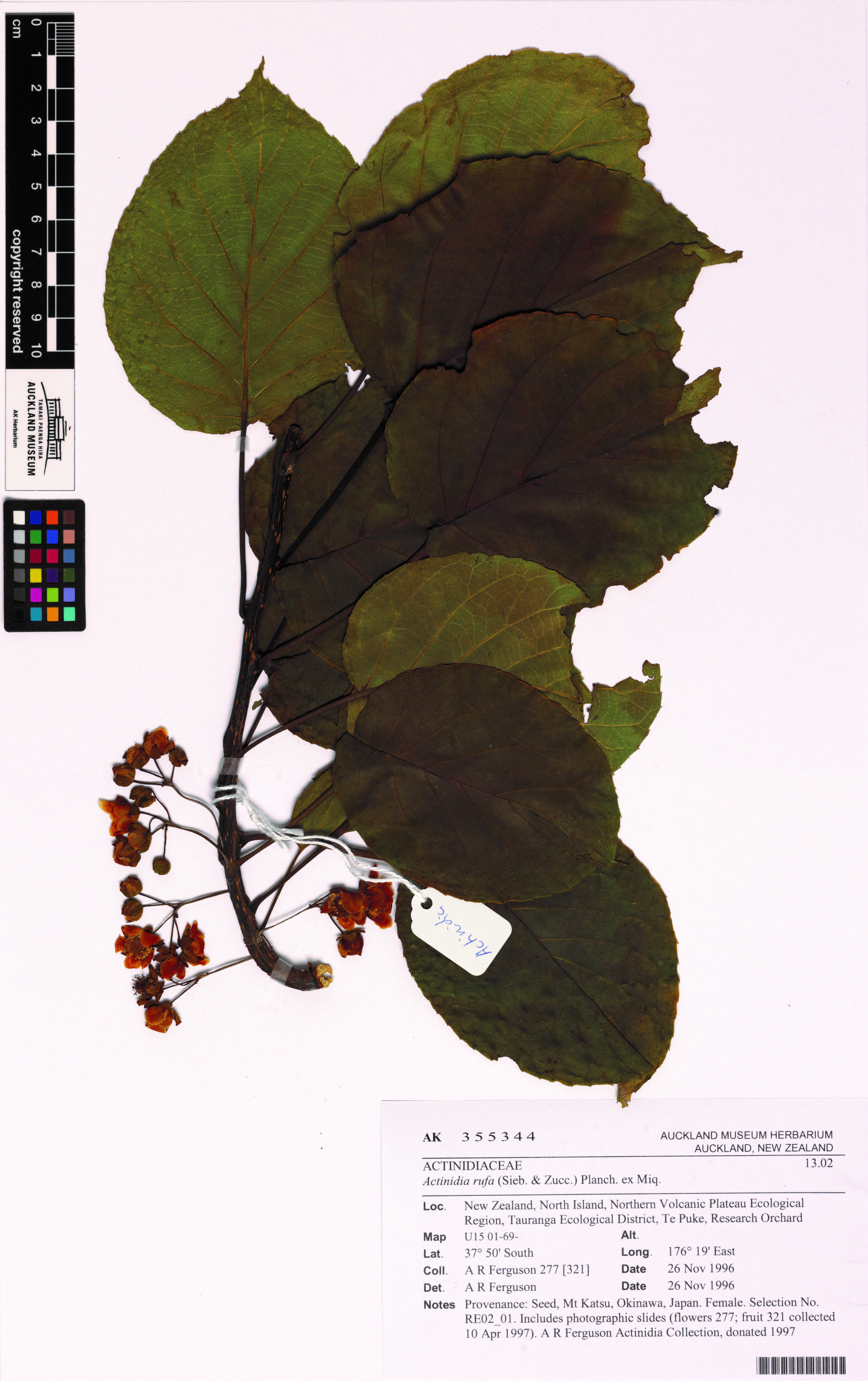
Herbarium specimen
