= Actinidia rudis =

Conservation status
- Vulnerable (IUCN 3.1)

Scientific classification
- Kingdom: Plantae
- Clade: Tracheophytes
- Clade: Angiosperms
- Clade: Eudicots
- Clade: Asterids
- Order: Ericales
- Family: Actinidiaceae
- Genus: Actinidia
- Species: A. rudis

Binomial name
- Actinidia rudis Dunn

Species of vine

Actinidia rudis is a species of plant in the Actinidiaceae family. It is endemic to China.
