= Actinidia strigosa =

Scientific classification
- Kingdom: Plantae
- Clade: Tracheophytes
- Clade: Angiosperms
- Clade: Eudicots
- Clade: Asterids
- Order: Ericales
- Family: Actinidiaceae
- Genus: Actinidia
- Species: A. strigosa

Binomial name
- Actinidia strigosa Hook.f. & Thomson

Species of plant

Actinidia strigosa is a species of flowering plant in the Chinese gooseberry family Actinidiaceae, native to Sikkim and eastern Nepal. A climber, its fruit is consumed by red pandas (Ailurus fulgens).
