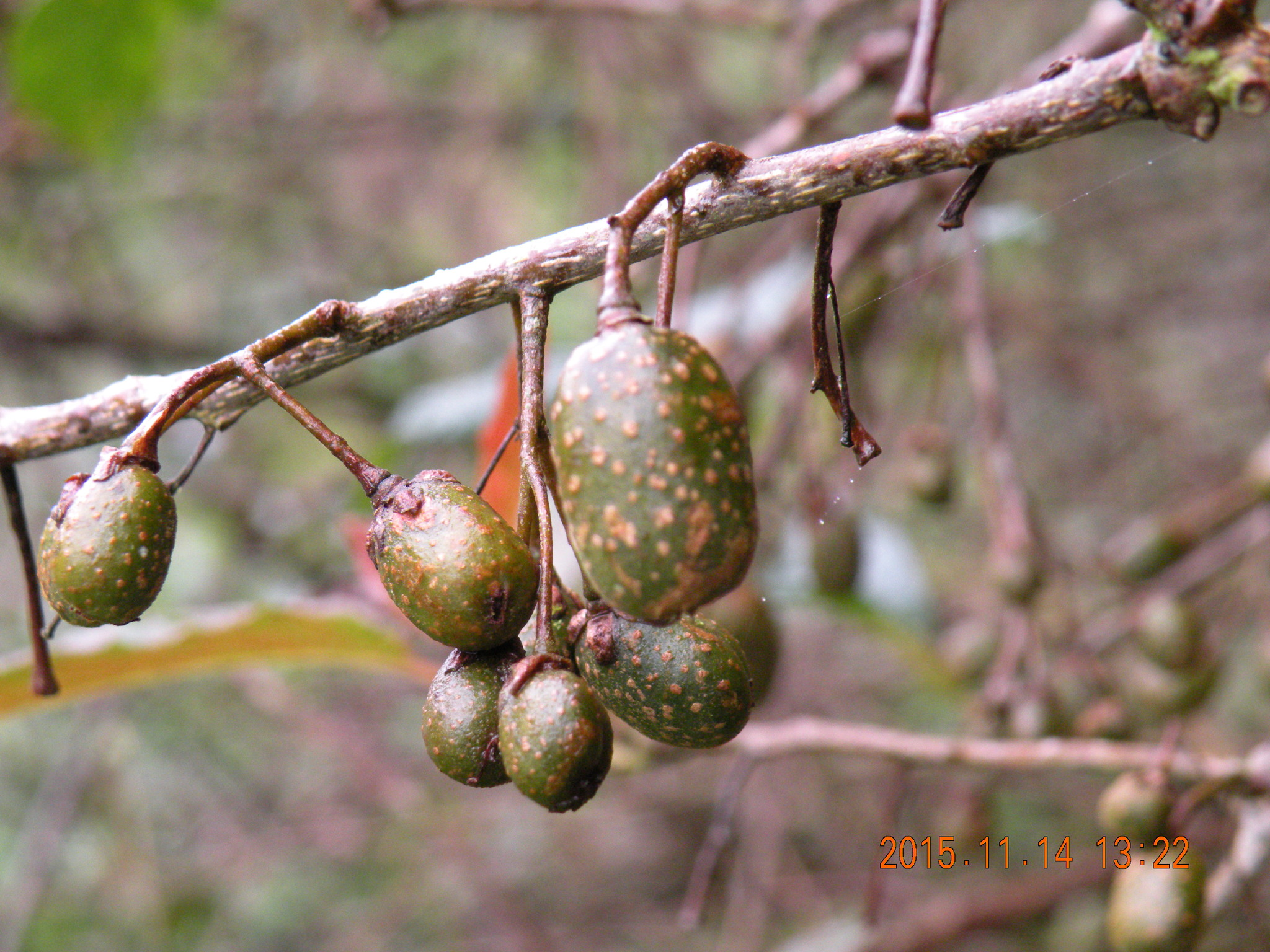

Scientific classification
- Kingdom: Plantae
- Clade: Tracheophytes
- Clade: Angiosperms
- Clade: Eudicots
- Clade: Asterids
- Order: Ericales
- Family: Actinidiaceae
- Genus: Actinidia
- Species: A. callosa

Binomial name
- Actinidia callosa Lindl.

Synonyms
- List: Actinidia arisanensis Hayata; Actinidia callosa var. ephippioidea C.F.Liang; Actinidia callosa var. formosana Finet & Gagnep.; Actinidia callosa var. pubiramula C.Y.Wu; Actinidia curvidens Dunn; Actinidia fanjingshanensis S.D.Shi & Q.B.Wang; Actinidia formosana (Finet & Gagnep.) Hayata; Actinidia pubescens (Dunn) Ridl.; Actinidia rankanensis Hayata; Actinidia remoganensis Hayata

= Actinidia callosa =

Species of plant

Actinidia callosa, the Himalayan kiwi vine, is a species of flowering plant in the Chinese gooseberry family Actinidiaceae.

A deciduous climber reaching 30 m (98 ft), it is found in a wide variety of habitats at elevations from 400 to 2,600 m (1,300 to 8,500 ft). Cultivated for its fruit, there is considerable doubt that it is a good species given vagrancies in the distributions of its varieties and its variable chromosome numbers.

== Distribution ==
Actinidia callosa is the species of Actinidia which has the largest natural distribution across the world, and is found in the Himalayas, central and southern China, Taiwan, Myanmar, Vietnam, and parts of South East Asia, including Peninsular Malaysia and Sumatra.

== Gallery ==
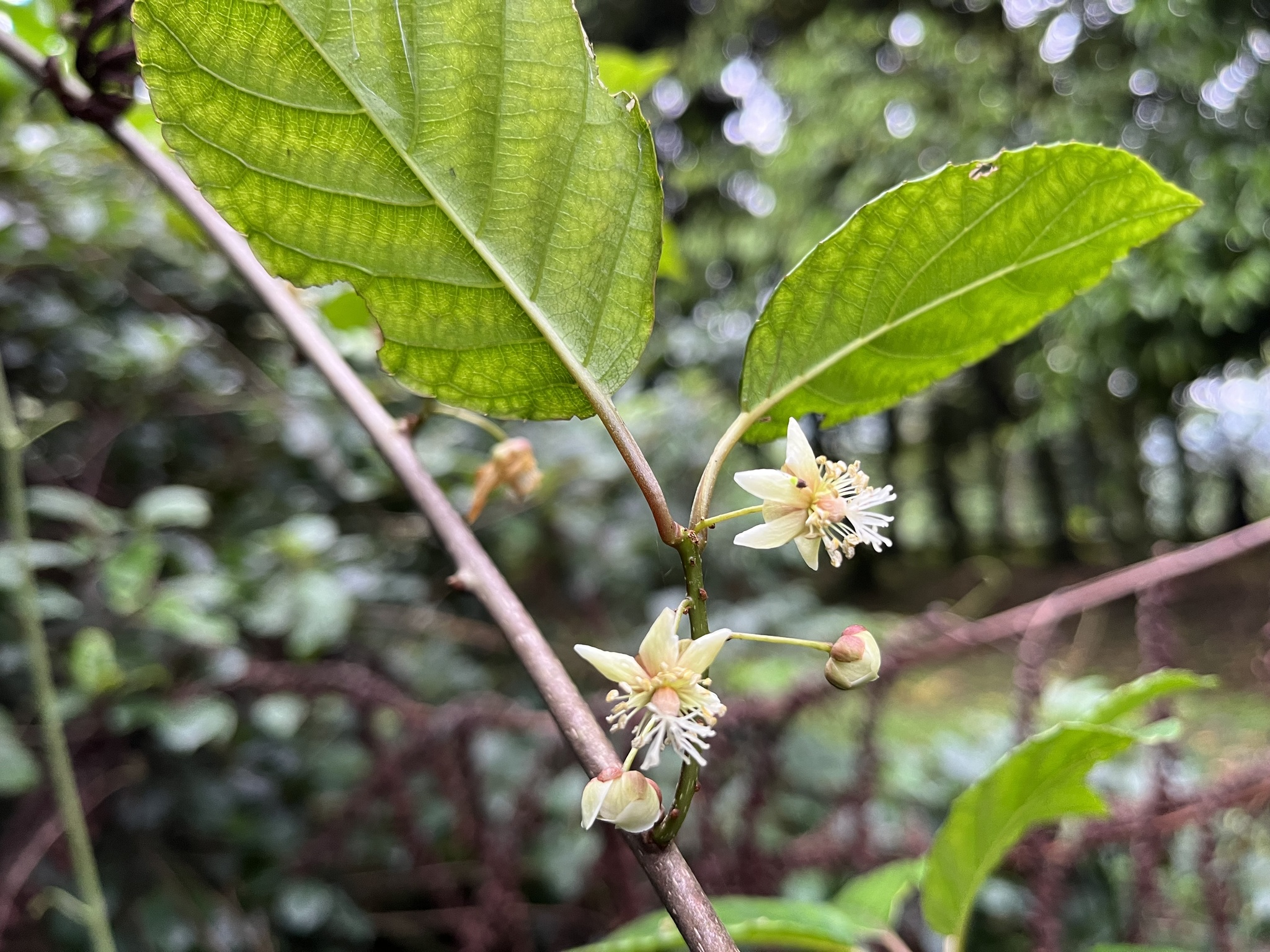
Flowers of Actinidia callosa var. discolor

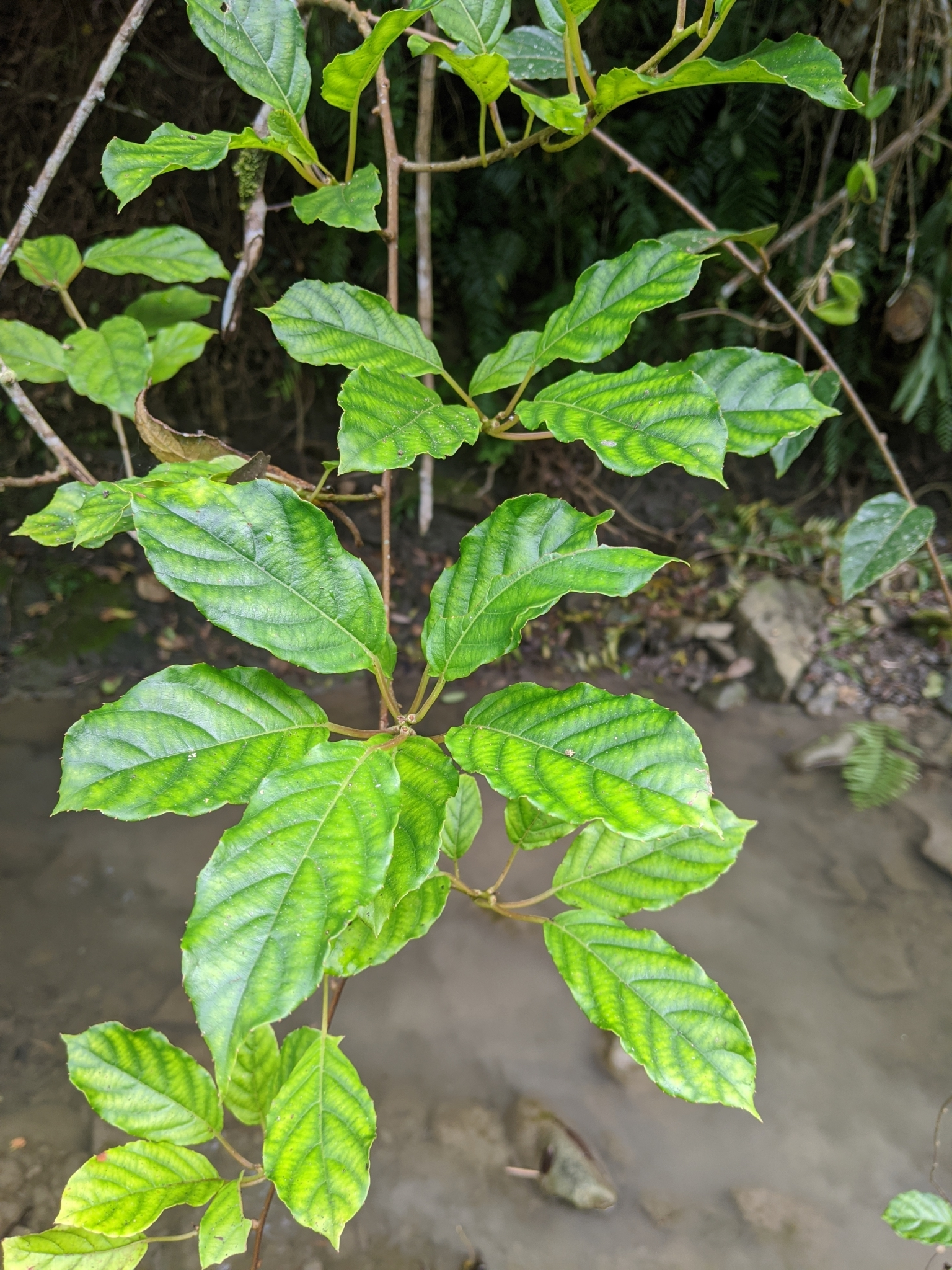
Leaves of Actinidia callosa var. discolor

== Subtaxa ==
The following varieties are accepted:

- Actinidia callosa var. acuminata C.F.Liang – Rucheng County, China
- Actinidia callosa var. callosa – Himalayas, Nepal, Assam, Myanmar, south-central China, Taiwan, Vietnam
- Actinidia callosa var. discolor C.F.Liang – southern China, Taiwan, Vietnam
- Actinidia callosa var. henryi Maxim. – Tibet, central & southern China
- Actinidia callosa var. pubescens Dunn – Assam, Yunnan, Peninsular Malaysia, Sumatra
- Actinidia callosa var. strigillosa C.F.Liang – Guizhou, China
