= Badrabad =

Badrabad or Badarabad (Persian: بدرآباد) may refer to various places in Iran:

- Badrabad, Darab, Fars Province
- Badrabad, Sepidan, Fars Province
- Badrabad, Baft, Kerman Province
- Badrabad, Narmashir, Kerman Province
- Badrabad, Rigan, Kerman Province
- Badrabad, Kermanshah
- Badrabad, Kurdistan
- Badrabad-e Olya, Lorestan Province
- Badrabad-e Sofla, Lorestan Province
- Badrabad, West Azerbaijan
- Badrabad, Yazd
