= Chub Tarash =

Chub Tarash (Persian: چوب تراش) may refer to:

- Chub Tarash, Lorestan
- Chub Tarash Mian Golal, Lorestan
- Chub Tarash, West Azerbaijan
