= Garisan =

Garisan may refer to:

== Iran ==
- Garisan, Iran, a village in Lorestan Province

== South Korea ==
Garisan (가리산; 加里山) is the name of two mountains in South Korea:

- Garisan (Gyeonggi-do)
- Garisan (Gangwon-do)
