= Dinarvand =

Dinarvand (Persian: ديناروند) may refer to:

- Dinarvand (tribe)
- Dinarvand- e Olya
- Dinarvand-e Sofla
