= Taluri =

Taluri or Telori (Persian: تلوری) may refer to:

- Taluri-ye Olya
- Taluri-ye Sofla
