= Darae =

Darae may refer to:

- Darae (fruit), a type of kiwi as used in Korean cuisine
- Da-rae, a Korean name
- Dara (Mesopotamia), or Darae, an ancient city of present-day Turkey

== See also ==
- Darai (disambiguation)
