= Deh-e Mohsen =

Deh-e Mohsen (Persian: ده محسن) may refer to:

- Deh-e Mohsen, Lorestan, a village in Lorestan Province, Iran
- Deh-e Mohsen, Sistan and Baluchestan, a village in Sistan and Baluchestan Province, Iran
