= Seyyed Ziba Mohammad =

Seyyed Ziba Mohammad سيدزيبامحمد
- Village
- Location within Iran
- Coordinates: 33°24′09″N 48°40′25″E
- Country: Iran
- Province: Lorestan
- County: Khorramabad
- Bakhsh: Central
- Rural District: Azna

Population (2006)
  - Total: 211
- Time zone: UTC+3:30 (IRST)
  - Summer (DST): UTC+4:30 (IRDT)

Seyyed Ziba Mohammad (Persian: سيدزيبامحمد, also Romanized as Seyyed Zībā Moḩammad and Saiyid Zeiha Muhammad; also known as Qaryeh Zībā Moḩammad and Zībā Moḩammad) is a village in Azna Rural District, in the Central District of Khorramabad County, Lorestan Province, Iran. At the 2006 census, its population was 211, in 41 families.
