= Qaleh Ali Morad Khan =

Qaleh Ali Morad Khan قلعه علي مراد خان
- Village
- Country: Iran
- Province: Lorestan
- County: Khorramabad
- Bakhsh: Central
- Rural District: Koregah-e Gharbi

Population (2006)
  - Total: 20
- Time zone: UTC+3:30 (IRST)
  - Summer (DST): UTC+4:30 (IRDT)

Qaleh Ali Morad Khan (Persian: قلعه علي مراد خان, also Romanized as Qalʿeh ʿAlī Morād Khān) is a village in Koregah-e Gharbi Rural District, in the Central District of Khorramabad County, Lorestan Province, Iran. At the 2006 census, its population was 20, in 5 families.
