= Varedeh =

Village in Iran

Varedeh وره ده
- Village
- Location within Iran
- Coordinates: 33°26′54″N 48°15′28″E
- Country: Iran
- Province: Lorestan
- County: Khorramabad
- Bakhsh: Central
- Rural District: Koregah-e Gharbi

Population (2006)
  - Total: 169
- Time zone: UTC+3:30 (IRST)
  - Summer (DST): UTC+4:30 (IRDT)

Varedeh (Persian: وره ده) is a village in Koregah-e Gharbi Rural District, in the Central District of Khorramabad County, Lorestan Province, Iran. As of the 2006 census, its population was 169, in 36 families.
