= Bahadorabad =

Bahadorabad or Bahador Abad (Persian: بهادراباد) may refer to:

- Bahadorabad, Fars
- Bahadorabad, Sistan and Baluchestan
