= Changai-ye Asgharabad =

Changai-ye Asgharabad (Persian: چَنگاءئ اَصغَر آباد) may refer to either of two villages in Iran:

- Asgharabad, Khorramabad
- Changai
