= Anardar =

Anardar (Persian: اناردر) may refer to:

- Anardar-e Bala
- Anardar-e Pain
