= Imanabad =

Imanabad or Eimanabad or Eymanabad (Persian: ايمان آباد or ايمن اباد) may refer to:

- Imanabad, Gilan (ايمن اباد - Īmanābād)
- Imanabad, Lorestan (ايمان آباد - Īmānābād)
- Imanabad-e Sofla, Lorestan Province
- Eminabad (ایمن آباد), Punjab Province, Pakistan
