= Vanayi =

Vanayi (Persian: ونايي) may refer to:

- Vanayi-ye Olya
- Vanayi-ye Sofla
