= Shahrak-e Baba Abbas =

Village in Lorestan province, Iran

Shahrak-e Baba Abbas Persian: شهرك باباعباس
- Village
- Location within Iran
- Coordinates: 33°28′00″N 48°16′52″E
- Country: Iran
- Province: Lorestan
- County: Khorramabad
- District: Central
- Rural District: Koregah-e Gharbi

Population (2016)
  - Total: 1,188
- Time zone: UTC+3:30 (IRST)

Shahrak-e Baba Abbas (Persian: شهرك باباعباس) (Note: Also romanized as Shahraḵ-e Bābā ‘Abbās; also known as Bābā ‘Abbās, Bābā ‘Abbās-e Daym, Bābā ‘Abbās-e Bālā, and Shahrak-e Shahid Beheshti (شهرک شهيد بهشتي)) is a village in Koregah-e Gharbi Rural District (Note: Formerly Koregah Rural District) of the Central District in Khorramabad County, Lorestan province, Iran.

== Demographics ==
=== Population ===
At the time of the 2006 National Census, the village's population was 1,151 in 263 households. The following census in 2011 counted 1,600 people in 308 households. The 2016 census measured the population of the village as 1,188 people in 362 households.
