= Vanayi-ye Olya =

Vanayi-ye Olya ونايي عليا
- Village
- Location within Iran
- Coordinates: 33°22′00″N 48°28′00″E
- Country: Iran
- Province: Lorestan
- County: Khorramabad
- Bakhsh: Central
- Rural District: Koregah-e Sharqi

Population (2006)
  - Total: 18
- Time zone: UTC+3:30 (IRST)
  - Summer (DST): UTC+4:30 (IRDT)

Vanayi-ye Olya (Persian: ونايي عليا, also Romanized as Vanāyī-ye ‘Olyā; also known as Vanābī-ye ‘Olyā) is a village in Koregah-e Sharqi Rural District, in the Central District of Khorramabad County, Lorestan Province, Iran. At the 2006 census, its population was 18, in 4 families.
