= Garisan, Iran =

Garisan گريسان
- Village
- Location within Iran
- Coordinates: 33°27′02″N 48°17′50″E
- Country: Iran
- Province: Lorestan
- County: Khorramabad
- Bakhsh: Central
- Rural District: Koregah-e Gharbi

Population (2006)
  - Total: 81
- Time zone: UTC+3:30 (IRST)
  - Summer (DST): UTC+4:30 (IRDT)

Garisan (Persian: گريسان, also Romanized as Garsīān, Garrīsān, and Gorrūsān) is a village in Koregah-e Gharbi Rural District, in the Central District of Khorramabad County, Lorestan Province, Iran. At the 2006 census, its population was 81, in 13 families.
