= Hajj Khadijeh =

Village in Lorestan province, Iran

Hajj Khadijeh Persian: حاج خديجه
- Village
- Location within Iran
- Country: Iran
- Province: Lorestan
- County: Khorramabad
- District: Central
- Rural District: Koregah-e Gharbi

Population (2016)
  - Total: 674
- Time zone: UTC+3:30 (IRST)

Hajj Khadijeh (Persian: حاج خديجه) (Note: Also romanized as Ḩājj Khadījeh) is a village in Koregah-e Gharbi Rural District (Note: Formerly Koregah Rural District) of the Central District in Khorramabad County, Lorestan province, Iran.

== Demographics ==
=== Population ===
At the time of the 2006 National Census, the village's population was 249 in 47 households. The following census in 2011 counted 328 people in 80 households. The 2016 census measured the population of the village as 674 people in 181 households.
