= Vanayi-ye Sofla =

Village in Lorestan, Iran

Vanayi-ye Sofla ونايي سفلي
- Village
- Location within Iran
- Coordinates: 33°22′00″N 48°27′00″E
- Country: Iran
- Province: Lorestan
- County: Khorramabad
- Bakhsh: Central
- Rural District: Koregah-e Sharqi

Population (2006)
  - Total: 24
- Time zone: UTC+3:30 (IRST)
  - Summer (DST): UTC+4:30 (IRDT)

Vanayi-ye Sofla (Persian: ونايي سفلي, also Romanized as Vanāyī-ye Soflá; also known as Vanābī-ye Soflá) is a village in Koregah-e Sharqi Rural District, in the Central District of Khorramabad County, Lorestan Province, Iran. At the 2006 census, its population was 24, in 6 families.
