= Araban, Khorramabad =

Village in Lorestan province, Iran

Araban Persian: عربان
- Village
- Location within Iran
- Coordinates: 33°27′29″N 48°19′25″E
- Country: Iran
- Province: Lorestan
- County: Khorramabad
- District: Central
- Rural District: Koregah-e Gharbi

Population (2016)
  - Total: 1,098
- Time zone: UTC+3:30 (IRST)

Araban (Persian: عربان) (Note: Also romanized as ‘Arabān; also known as ‘Oryān) is a village in Koregah-e Gharbi Rural District (Note: Formerly Koregah Rural District) of the Central District in Khorramabad County, Lorestan province, Iran.

== Demographics ==
=== Population ===
At the time of the 2006 National Census, the village's population was 407 in 75 households. The following census in 2011 counted 852 people in 233 households. The 2016 census measured the population of the village as 1,098 people in 332 households.
