= Poshteh Jazayeri =

Village in Lorestan province, Iran

Poshteh Jazayeri Persian: پشته جزايري
- Village
- Location within Iran
- Coordinates: 33°26′14″N 48°20′24″E
- Country: Iran
- Province: Lorestan
- County: Khorramabad
- District: Central
- Rural District: Koregah-e Gharbi

Population (2016)
  - Total: 2,471
- Time zone: UTC+3:30 (IRST)

Poshteh Jazayeri (Persian: پشته جزايري) (Note: Also romanized as Poshteh Jazāyerī) is a village in Koregah-e Gharbi Rural District (Note: Formerly Koregah Rural District) of the Central District in Khorramabad County, Lorestan province, Iran.

== Demographics ==
=== Population ===
At the time of the 2006 National Census, the village's population was 490 in 101 households. The following census in 2011 counted 1,299 people in 347 households. The 2016 census measured the population of the village as 2,471 people in 717 households.
