= Deh-e Baqer =

Village in Lorestan province, Iran

Deh-e Baqer Persian: ده باقر
- Village
- Location within Iran
- Coordinates: 33°22′55″N 48°22′50″E
- Country: Iran
- Province: Lorestan
- County: Khorramabad
- District: Central
- Rural District: Koregah-e Sharqi

Population (2016)
  - Total: 420
- Time zone: UTC+3:30 (IRST)

Deh-e Baqer (Persian: ده باقر) (Note: Also romanized as Deh Bāqer, Deh-e Bāqer, and Deh-i-Bāgar) is a village in Koregah-e Sharqi Rural District of the Central District in Khorramabad County, Lorestan province, Iran.

== Demographics ==
=== Population ===
At the time of the 2006 National Census, the village's population was 461 in 92 households. The following census in 2011 counted 427 people in 107 households. The 2016 census measured the population of the village as 420 people in 112 households.
