= Tir Bazar =

Village in Lorestan province, Iran

Tir Bazar Persian: تيربازار
- Village
- Location within Iran
- Coordinates: 33°26′38″N 48°18′19″E
- Country: Iran
- Province: Lorestan
- County: Khorramabad
- District: Central
- Rural District: Koregah-e Gharbi

Population (2016)
  - Total: 612
- Time zone: UTC+3:30 (IRST)

Tir Bazar (Persian: تيربازار) (Note: Also romanized as Tīr Bāzār; also known as Tīr Bāzān and Tīr Bāzār Bāla) is a village in Koregah-e Gharbi Rural District (Note: Formerly Koregah Rural District) of the Central District in Khorramabad County, Lorestan province, Iran.

== Demographics ==
=== Population ===
At the time of the 2006 National Census, the village's population was 648 in 130 households. The following census in 2011 counted 611 people in 170 households. The 2016 census measured the population of the village as 612 people in 169 households.
