= Aliabad, Azna (western) =

Village in Lorestan province, Iran

Aliabad Persian: علي اباد
- Village
- Location within Iran
- Coordinates: 33°26′26″N 48°32′45″E
- Country: Iran
- Province: Lorestan
- County: Khorramabad
- District: Central
- Rural District: Azna

Population (2016)
  - Total: 102
- Time zone: UTC+3:30 (IRST)

Aliabad (Persian: علي اباد) (Note: Also romanized as ‘Alīābād) is a village in Azna Rural District of the Central District in Khorramabad County, Lorestan province, Iran.

== Demographics ==
=== Population ===
At the time of the 2006 National Census, the village's population was 85 in 20 households. The following census in 2011 counted 77 people in 23 households. The 2016 census measured the population of the village as 102 people in 30 households.
