= Chogha Khandaq =

Village in Lorestan province, Iran

Chogha Khandaq Persian: چغاخندق
- Village
- Location within Iran
- Country: Iran
- Province: Lorestan
- County: Khorramabad
- District: Central
- Rural District: Koregah-e Gharbi

Population (2016)
  - Total: 1,768
- Time zone: UTC+3:30 (IRST)

Chogha Khandaq (Persian: چغاخندق) (Note: Also romanized as Choghā Khandaq and Choqā Khandaq) is a village in Koregah-e Gharbi Rural District (Note: Formerly Koregah Rural District) of the Central District in Khorramabad County, Lorestan province, Iran.

== Demographics ==
=== Population ===
At the time of the 2006 National Census, the village's population was 1,466 in 266 households. The 2016 census measured the population of the village as 1,768 people in 503 households.
