= Soheyl Beygi =

Village in Lorestan province, Iran

Soheyl Beygi Persian: سهيل بيگي
- Village
- Location within Iran
- Coordinates: 33°24′56″N 48°19′24″E
- Country: Iran
- Province: Lorestan
- County: Khorramabad
- District: Central
- Rural District: Koregah-e Gharbi

Population (2016)
  - Total: 2,364
- Time zone: UTC+3:30 (IRST)

Soheyl Beygi (Persian: سهيل بيگي) (Note: Also romanized as Soheyl Beygī; also known as Asīlbāki) is a village in Koregah-e Gharbi Rural District (Note: Formerly Koregah Rural District) of the Central District in Khorramabad County, Lorestan province, Iran.

== Demographics ==
=== Population ===
At the time of the 2006 National Census, the village's population was 1,394 in 279 households. The following census in 2011 counted 1,971 people in 508 households. The 2016 census measured the population of the village as 2,364 people in 664 households.
