= Sarab-e Suri =

Village in Lorestan province, Iran

Sarab-e Suri Persian: سرابسوري
- Village
- Location within Iran
- Coordinates: 33°25′45″N 48°32′57″E
- Country: Iran
- Province: Lorestan
- County: Khorramabad
- District: Central
- Rural District: Azna

Population (2016)
  - Total: 332
- Time zone: UTC+3:30 (IRST)

Sarab-e Suri (Persian: سرابسوري) (Note: Also romanized as Sarāb-e Sūrī; also known as Sarāb Sīrī and Sarāb-e Mīrī) is a village in Azna Rural District of the Central District in Khorramabad County, Lorestan province, Iran.

== Demographics ==
=== Population ===
At the time of the 2006 National Census, the village's population was 336 in 89 households. The following census in 2011 counted 341 people in 87 households. The 2016 census measured the population of the village as 332 people in 96 households.
