= Alireza Beiranvand =

Iranian footballer (born 1988)

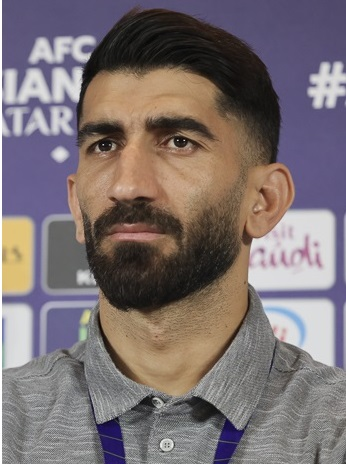
- Beiranvand in 2024

Personal information
- Full name: Alireza Safar Beiranvand
- Date of birth: 21 September 1992 (age 34)
- Place of birth: Sarab-e Yas, Khorramabad, Iran
- Height: 1.95 m (6 ft 5 in)
- Position: Goalkeeper

Team information
- Current team: Fajr Sepasi

Youth career
- 2007–2008: Vahdat
- 2008–2011: Naft Tehran

Senior career*
Years	Team	Apps	(Gls)
2011–2016	Naft Tehran	69	(0)
2016–2020	Persepolis	89	(0)
2020–2022	Royal Antwerp	10	(0)
2021–2022	→ Boavista (loan)	8	(0)
2022–2024	Persepolis	55	(0)
2024–	Tractor	48	(0)
2026–	→ Fajr Sepasi (loan)	0	(0)

International career^{‡}
2010–2012	Iran U20	1	(0)
2012–2014	Iran U23	11	(0)
2015–	Iran	90	(0)
Medal record
Representing Iran
CAFA Nations Cup
Winner	2023 Kyrgyzstan – Uzbekistan	Team
- * Club domestic league appearances and goals as of 26 February 2026 ‡ National team caps and goals as of 24 September 2026

Alireza Safar Beiranvand (Note: Persian: علیرضا صفر بیرانوند) (born 21 September 1992) is an Iranian professional footballer who plays as a goalkeeper for the Iran national team. Also known as "Beiro", and the "Wall of Persia", he represented Iran internationally at the AFC Asian Cup in 2015, 2019 and 2023, and at the FIFA World Cup in 2018, 2022, and 2026.

In 2017, Beiranvand became the first Iranian ever to be nominated for an individual award at The Best FIFA Football Awards. He has been the best goalkeeper in the Persian Gulf Pro League for four consecutive seasons from 2014 to 2019 and has also been the Iranian Footballer of the Year in 2019. With 23 clean sheets in 37 matches during the 2017–18 season, he ranked as the second goalkeeper in the world for the cleanest sheets.

In addition, Beiranvand achieved two Guinness World Records during his career, including the farthest distance throw of a football at 61.0026 metres (200.140 ft) against South Korea on 11 October 2016, and the longest football drop kick at 78.014 metres (255.95 ft) on 17 April 2019.

== Early life ==
Beiranvand was born in the small village of Sarab-e Yas in Khorramabad County, Lorestan Province, to a Kurdish family belonging to the Lak confederation. When asked about his origins on Khandevane, Beiranvand said he was a Kurdish Lak, and denied being Lur. In addition to his native Laki, he can speak Luri, Persian, and some English. His family was nomadic, constantly on the move seeking new pastures. As a teenager, Beiranvand ran away from home and moved to Tehran in pursuit of his professional football dreams, and was even homeless for some time. Before his football career, he worked at a carwash specializing in four-wheel drives, where he leveraged his height advantage, as well as in a clothing factory and a pizzeria.

=== Marriage ===
Beiranvand got married in 2010. He has a son and a daughter.

== Club career ==
=== Naft Tehran ===
Beiranvand has played with Naft Tehran since 2011. He made his debut in the Hazfi Cup against Damash on 25 October 2011. He was involved in negotiations with the rival team Persepolis F.C., but the chairman of Naft Tehran, Mansour Ghanbarzadeh, did not allow him to leave the club. In his first year as the first-choice goalkeeper, Beiranvand led the team to a third place League finish and a spot in the AFC Champions League for the first time in the club's history. On 23 March 2014, he extended his contract with the club until June 2019. On 24 November 2014, Beiranvand provided an assist in their match against Tractor Sazi by throwing the ball into the opponent's half.

He was linked with a move to Persepolis in January 2016, but the move fell through at the last moment. Beiranvand left Naft at the end of the 2015–16 season after his contract expired.

=== Persepolis ===
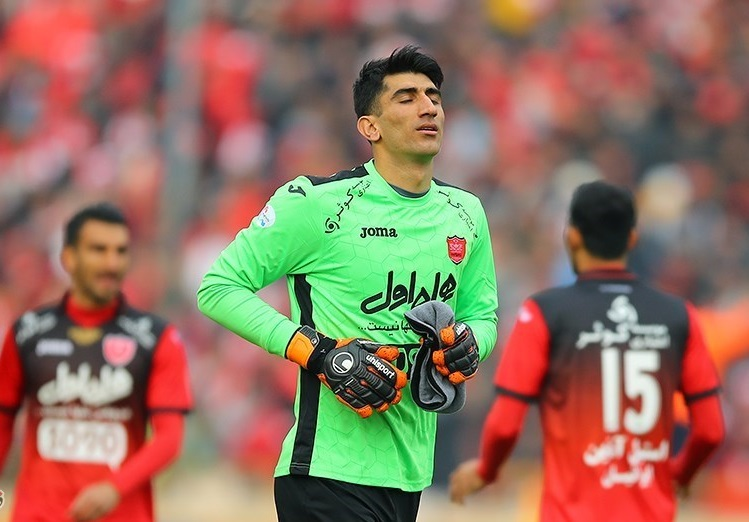
Beiranvand with Persepolis in Tehran Derby, February 2017

On 16 May 2016, Beiranvand signed a two–year contract with league runners-up Persepolis. In 2017 Beiranvand extended his contract with the club until 2021. In December 2017, in a match against Foolad, Beiranvand set a league record of going 718 minutes without conceding a goal, which was later broken by Esteghlal goalkeeper Hossein Hosseini.

What he did was amazing. He was the difference against us. He is truly a great goalkeeper; he fought and kept out our attack. There may have been other good players in the Persepolis team but the one who made the result possible was Beiranvand.

— Portuguese coach Jesualdo Ferreira, October 2018.

Beiranvand was named 2018 AFC Champions League semi-final first leg player of the week following his performance against Al Sadd. He was also "Man of the match" and with "Team of the Week" 2nd leg after he saved many of Al Sadd's chances and helped Persepolis reach the final, His five clean sheets during the competition was the most of any goalkeeper. He was reportedly chosen as one of the candidates for the 2018 Asian Footballer of the Year award, but his exclusion was described by Asian football writers as a big shock, and an outrageous and scandalous event. The following season Beiranvand kept 16 clean sheets in 2018–19 Pro League and claimed Golden Gloves for three consecutive years and four successive times overall.

=== Antwerp ===
In late July 2020, Jupiler Pro League side Royal Antwerp confirmed signing Beiranvand to a three-year contract for an undisclosed fee. He made his debut on 10 December in a Europa League away match against Tottenham Hotspur.

=== Boavista (loan) ===
On 10 July 2021, Beiranvand joined Primeira Liga side Boavista on a one-year loan, with a purchase option for €1 million.

=== Return to Persepolis ===
Beiranvand joined Persepolis on 31 May 2022 with a new three-year contract on a free transfer.

=== Tractor ===
On 16 July 2024, Beiranvand joined Tractor on a three-year deal from Persepolis.

== International career ==
=== Youth levels ===
He represented Iran at various youth levels, such as the U-19 team during the 2010 AFC U-19 Championship and the U-22 team in the 2013 U-22 Asian Cup qualifiers.

=== Senior team ===
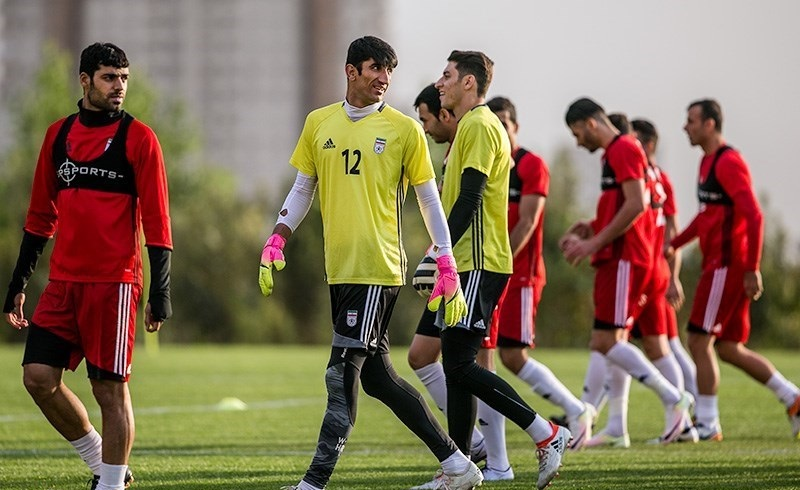
Beiranvand training with Iran in 2016

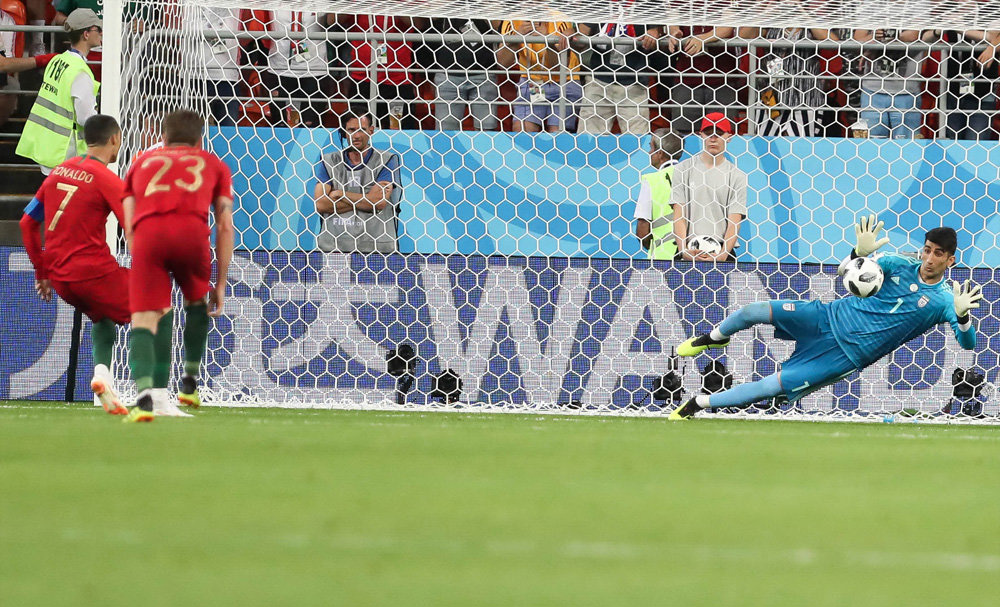
Beiranvand saving a penalty from Cristiano Ronaldo at the 2018 FIFA World Cup

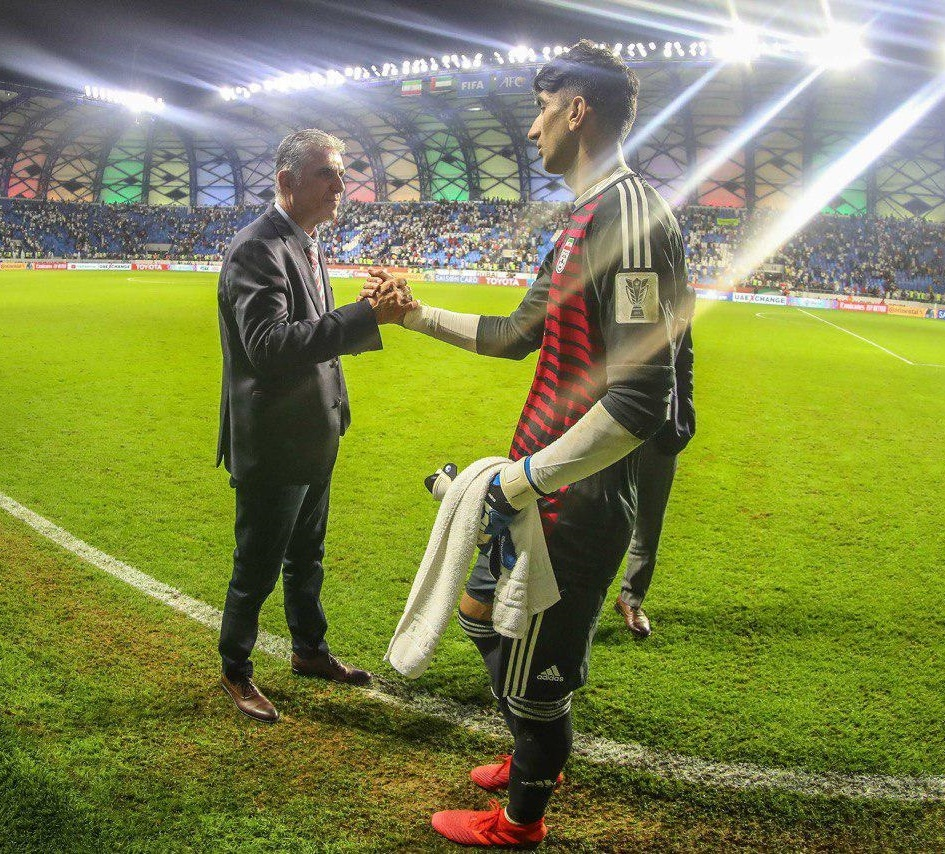
Beiranvand and Queiroz after a 2019 AFC Asian Cup match.

In April 2014, he was called up to the Iran national football team training camp in South Africa by coach Carlos Queiroz after many Sepahan players could not make it because of AFC Champions League matches, including goalkeeper Rahman Ahmadi. He was also selected in Iran's 30-man provisional squad for the 2014 FIFA World Cup. However, Beiranvand was not included in Iran's squad for the World Cup, without playing any match in pre-World Cup friendly matches. He was called into Iran's 2015 AFC Asian Cup squad on 30 December 2014 by Carlos Queiroz. He made his debut in a friendly match against Iraq on 4 January 2015, just before the 2015 AFC Asian Cup.

==== 2018 FIFA World Cup ====
During the 2018 FIFA World Cup qualification, first-choice goalkeeper Alireza Haghighi was denied a visa for entry to Guam ahead of their fixture, alongside left back Ehsan Hajsafi. Beiranvand was thus given his first competitive start for the senior team. However, he was given a straight red in the 72nd minute for a foul on Guam midfielder Dylan Naputi, less than a minute after Iran had used up all of their substitutions, forcing defender Ezzatollah Pourghaz to take on goalkeeper duties.

During the final round of the 2018 FIFA World Cup qualification, Beiranvand became Iran's starting goalkeeper, replacing Alireza Haghighi. In May 2018, he was named in Iran's preliminary squad for the 2018 FIFA World Cup in Russia.

In Iran's last match of the 2018 World Cup, Beiranvand saved a penalty from Cristiano Ronaldo, as Iran drew 1–1 with Portugal. Beiranvand was the starting goalkeeper of the Iran squad at the 2019 AFC Asian Cup. He was again in the spotlight when he saved a penalty from Ahmed Mubarak Al-Mahaijri, as Iran won 2–0 against Oman. He was again in the spotlight when he saved a penalty from the captain of Cambodia, as Iran won 14–0 against Cambodia.

==== 2022 FIFA World Cup ====
Beiranvand was Iran's starting goalkeeper at the 2022 FIFA World Cup, but during the match against England he collided with defender Majid Hosseini; after a lengthy medical treatment on the field, he was allowed to continue, but appeared disoriented and minutes later lied down on the ground and requested a substitution, after which he was taken to a nearby hospital. Headway called the decision to keep him on the field an "utter disgrace" and an "abject failure" of the concussion protocol. He was replaced by Hossein Hosseini, who remained in the starting position for the next match against Wales; Beiranvand then returned for the third group stage match against the United States.

==== 2026 FIFA World Cup ====
Beiranvand was named in the 26-man squad for the 2026 FIFA World Cup. On 21 June 2026, he made seven saves in a goalless 0–0 draw against Belgium, earning him the Man of the Match award.

== Style of play ==
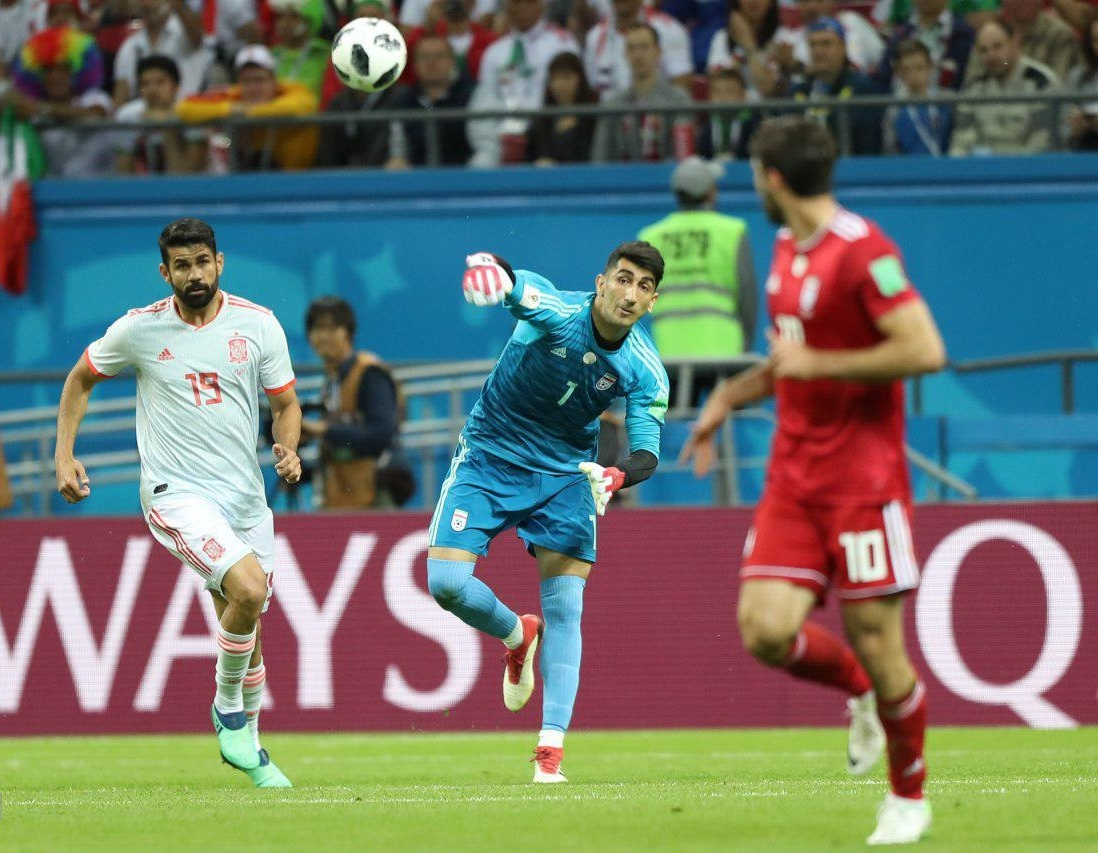
Beiranvand playing for Iran against Spain at the 2018 FIFA World Cup.

Beiranvand's main trait is his ability to take very long throws. In the 2015 AFC Champions League Round of 16 against Al Ahli, Beiranvand made a throw that reached 60m. On 24 November 2014, he provided an assist against Tractor Sazi by throwing the ball into the opponent's half. Beiranvand is good in aerial duels and has been praised for his athleticism, "outstanding shot-stopping", acrobatic dives, and quick reflexes.

He, along with Zahra Khajavi, are known as the record holders of the longest hand throws in Iranian football.

== Personal life ==
=== Political views ===
Beiranvand is known be to a staunch supporter of the government of the Islamic Republic of Iran. In July 2018, following Beiranvand's performance against Portugal, Iranian supreme leader Ali Khamenei praised his performance and said in a government delegation: 'I ask the government's economic team, like the national team that fought bravely in the World Cup, and especially the team's good goalkeeper [Beiranvand], to work to solve problems". Beiranvand subsequently made a lengthy post on Instagram thanking Khamenei for his support.

Following Israeli attacks on Iran in 2025 initiating the Twelve-Day War, Beiranvand said, "We will give our hearts and souls, without any hesitation, for Iran. With regards to the 2026 Iran war, Beiranvand wrote on his Instagram story, "They claim to be helping the people of Iran but in reality they are destroying the country's infrastructure--assets which belong to the people".

== Career statistics ==
=== Club ===
As of match played 14 April 2026

Appearances and goals by club, season and competition
Club	Season	League			Cup		Continental		Other		Total	
Club	Season	Division	Apps	Goals	Apps	Goals	Apps	Goals	Apps	Goals	Apps	Goals
Naft Tehran	2012–13	Persian Gulf Pro League	1	0	0	0	—		—		1	0
Naft Tehran	2013–14	Persian Gulf Pro League	23	0	1	0	—		—		24	0
Naft Tehran	2014–15	Persian Gulf Pro League	26	0	2	0	9	0	—		37	0
Naft Tehran	2015–16	Persian Gulf Pro League	19	0	1	0	3	0	—		23	0
Naft Tehran	Total		69	0	4	0	12	0	—		85	0
Persepolis	2016–17	Persian Gulf Pro League	24	0	0	0	8 (Note: Appearances in AFC Champions League)	0	—		32	0
Persepolis	2017–18	Persian Gulf Pro League	27	0	3	0	12	0	1 (Note: Appearance in Iranian Super Cup)	0	43	0
Persepolis	2018–19	Persian Gulf Pro League	24	0	3	0	12	0	0	0	39	0
Persepolis	2019–20	Persian Gulf Pro League	14	0	2	0	2	0	0	0	18	0
Persepolis	2022–23	Persian Gulf Pro League	29	0	5	0	—		—		34	0
Persepolis	2023–24	Persian Gulf Pro League	26	0	1	0	6	0	—		33	0
Persepolis	Total		144	0	14	0	40	0	1	0	199	0
Antwerp	2020–21	Belgian First Division A	10	0	0	0	2 (Note: Appearances in UEFA Europa League)	0	0	0	12	0
Boavista (loan)	2021–22	Primeira Liga	8	0	0	0	0	0	1 (Note: Appearance in Taça da Liga)	0	9	0
Tractor	2024–25	Persian Gulf Pro League	29	0	0	0	8	0	—		37	0
Tractor	2025–26	Persian Gulf Pro League	19	0	1	0	9	0	0	0	29	0
Tractor	2026-27	Persian Gulf Pro League	7	0	0	0	0	0	—		7	0
Tractor	Total		55	0	1	0	17	0	0	0	73	0
Career total			286	0	19	0	71	0	2	0	378	0

=== International ===
As of match played 24 September 2026

Appearances and goals by national team and year
National team	Year	Apps	Goals
Iran	2015	3	0
Iran	2016	6	0
Iran	2017	9	0
Iran	2018	10	0
Iran	2019	12	0
Iran	2021	9	0
Iran	2022	5	0
Iran	2023	8	0
Iran	2024	15	0
Iran	2025	6	0
Iran	2026	7	0
Total		90	0

== Honours ==
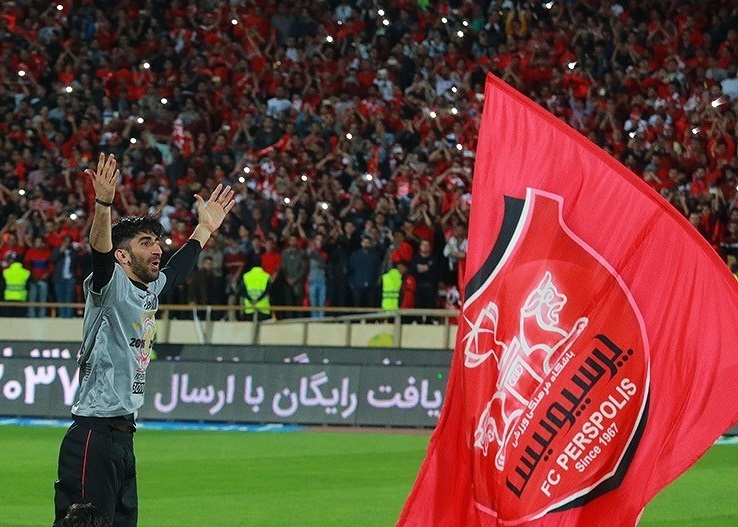
Beiranvand celebrating after winning the 2016–17 Persian Gulf Pro League.

Naft Tehran

- Hazfi Cup runner-up: 2014–15

Persepolis

- Persian Gulf Pro League: (6): 2016–17, 2017–18, 2018–19, 2019–20, 2022–23, 2023–24
- Hazfi Cup: (2): 2018–19, 2022–23
- Iranian Super Cup: (4): 2017, 2018, 2019, 2023
- AFC Champions League runner-up: 2018

Tractor

- Persian Gulf Pro League: 2024–25
- Iranian Super Cup: 2025

Iran

- CAFA Nations Cup: 2023
- Jordan International Tournament: 2023

Individual

- Persian Gulf Pro League Best Goalkeeper of the Year: 2014–15, 2016–17, 2017–18, 2018–19
- Persian Gulf Pro League Team of the Year: 2014–15, 2016–17, 2017–18, 2018–19
- Persian Gulf Pro League Golden Glove: 2022–23, 2025–26
- AFC Champions League Fans' Best XI: 2018
- AFC Champions League OPTA Best XI: 2018
- Iranian Footballer of the Year: 2019
- AFC Asian Cup Team of the Tournament: 2019
- AFC Fans' Best Player of All Time at the FIFA World Cup: 2020
- AFC Player of the Year: 2026

== Guinness World Records ==
Beiranvand achieved two Guinness World Records during his career, including the farthest distance throw of a football at 61.0026 metres (200.140 ft) against South Korea on 11 October 2016, and the longest football drop kick at 78.014 metres (255.95 ft) on 17 April 2019.
