= Anardar-e Pain =

Anardar-e Pain اناردرپايين
- Village
- Location within Iran
- Coordinates: 33°22′35″N 48°20′05″E
- Country: Iran
- Province: Lorestan
- County: Khorramabad
- Bakhsh: Central
- Rural District: Koregah-e Gharbi

Population (2006)
  - Total: 15
- Time zone: UTC+3:30 (IRST)
  - Summer (DST): UTC+4:30 (IRDT)

Anardar-e Pain (Persian: اناردرپايين, also Romanized as Anārdar-e Pā’īn) is a village in Koregah-e Gharbi Rural District, in the Central District of Khorramabad County, Lorestan Province, Iran. At the 2006 census, its population was 15, in 4 families.
