= Asgharabad, Khorramabad =

Asgharabad اصغراباد
- Village
- Location within Iran
- Coordinates: 33°27′38″N 48°15′56″E
- Country: Iran
- Province: Lorestan
- County: Khorramabad
- Bakhsh: Central
- Rural District: Koregah-e Gharbi

Population (2006)
  - Total: 325
- Time zone: UTC+3:30 (IRST)
  - Summer (DST): UTC+4:30 (IRDT)

Asgharabad (Persian: اصغراباد, also Romanized as Aşgharābād; also known as Changā’ī-ye Aşgharābād) is a village in Koregah-e Gharbi Rural District, in the Central District of Khorramabad County, Lorestan Province, Iran. At the 2006 census, its population was 325, in 61 families.
