= Sorkheh Deh-e Sofla =

Village in Lorestan province, Iran

Sorkheh Deh-e Sofla Persian: سرخه ده سفلي
- Village
- Location within Iran
- Coordinates: 33°22′30″N 48°22′32″E
- Country: Iran
- Province: Lorestan
- County: Khorramabad
- District: Central
- Rural District: Koregah-e Sharqi

Population (2016)
  - Total: 881
- Time zone: UTC+3:30 (IRST)

Sorkheh Deh-e Sofla (Persian: سرخه ده سفلي) (Note: Also romanized as Sorkheh Deh-e Soflá) is a village in Koregah-e Sharqi Rural District of the Central District in Khorramabad County, Lorestan province, Iran.

== Demographics ==
=== Population ===
At the time of the 2006 National Census, the village's population was 1,095 in 188 households. The following census in 2011 counted 990 people in 220 households. The 2016 census measured the population of the village as 881 people in 234 households.
