= Seyfabad, Khorramabad =

Village in Lorestan province, Iran

Seyfabad Persian: سيف اباد
- Village
- Location within Iran
- Coordinates: 33°23′04″N 48°35′32″E
- Country: Iran
- Province: Lorestan
- County: Khorramabad
- District: Central
- Rural District: Azna

Population (2016)
  - Total: 526
- Time zone: UTC+3:30 (IRST)

Seyfabad (Persian: سيف اباد) (Note: Also romanized as Seyfābād) is a village in Azna Rural District of the Central District in Khorramabad County, Lorestan province, Iran.

== Demographics ==
=== Population ===
At the time of the 2006 National Census, the village's population was 593 in 110 households. The following census in 2011 counted 570 people in 127 households. The 2016 census measured the population of the village as 526 people in 151 households.
