= Gilvaran-e Pain =

Village in Lorestan province, Iran

Gilvaran-e Pain Persian: گيلوران پايين
- Village
- Location within Iran
- Coordinates: 33°27′53″N 48°18′13″E
- Country: Iran
- Province: Lorestan
- County: Khorramabad
- District: Central
- Rural District: Koregah-e Gharbi

Population (2016)
  - Total: 136
- Time zone: UTC+3:30 (IRST)

Gilvaran-e Pain (Persian: گيلوران پايين) (Note: Also romanized as Gīlvarān-e Pā’īn; also known as Gelvaran-e Pain, Gelvarān-e Pā’īn, and Gol Varān-e Pā’īn) is a village in Koregah-e Gharbi Rural District (Note: Formerly Koregah Rural District) of the Central District in Khorramabad County, Lorestan province, Iran.

== Demographics ==
=== Population ===
At the time of the 2006 National Census, the village's population was 114 in 23 households. The following census in 2011 counted 119 people in 27 households. The 2016 census measured the population of the village as 136 people in 40 households.
