= Karimabad, Khorramabad =

Village in Lorestan province, Iran

Karimabad Persian: كريم اباد
- Village
- Location within Iran
- Coordinates: 33°23′02″N 48°35′42″E
- Country: Iran
- Province: Lorestan
- County: Khorramabad
- District: Central
- Rural District: Azna

Population (2016)
  - Total: 327
- Time zone: UTC+3:30 (IRST)

Karimabad (Persian: كريم اباد) (Note: Also romanized as Karīmābād) is a village in Azna Rural District of the Central District in Khorramabad County, Lorestan province, Iran.

== Demographics ==
=== Population ===
At the time of the 2006 National Census, the village's population was 357 in 62 households. The following census in 2011 counted 387 people in 94 households. The 2016 census measured the population of the village as 327 people in 103 households.
