= Belilvand =

Village in Lorestan province, Iran

Belilvand Persian: بليلوند
- Village
- Location within Iran
- Coordinates: 33°25′16″N 48°21′55″E
- Country: Iran
- Province: Lorestan
- County: Khorramabad
- District: Central
- Rural District: Koregah-e Sharqi

Population (2016)
  - Total: 391
- Time zone: UTC+3:30 (IRST)
- Area code: 066

Belilvand (Persian: بليلوند) (Note: Also romanized as Belīlvand) is a village in Koregah-e Sharqi Rural District of the Central District in Khorramabad County, Lorestan province, Iran. It lies to the southeast of Khorramabad, although the roads leading to it make the distance considerably further.

== Demographics ==
=== Population ===
At the time of the 2006 National Census, the village's population was 476 in 88 households. The following census in 2011 counted 480 people in 119 households. The 2016 census measured the population of the village as 391 people in 120 households.
