= Darai =

Darai may refer to:

- Darai language, a language of Nepal
- Darai people, an ethnic group of Nepal
- Al Darai, a tribe of the United Arab Emirates
- Darai, Iran, a village in Iran
- Lipika Singh Darai, Indian filmmaker

== See also ==
- Darae (disambiguation)
- Daray, a Polish drummer
- Derai, a town in Bangladesh
