= Gilvaran-e Bala =

Village in Lorestan province, Iran

Gilvaran-e Bala Persian: گيلوران بالا
- Village
- Location within Iran
- Coordinates: 33°28′06″N 48°19′42″E
- Country: Iran
- Province: Lorestan
- County: Khorramabad
- District: Central
- Rural District: Koregah-e Gharbi

Population (2016)
  - Total: 659
- Time zone: UTC+3:30 (IRST)

Gilvaran-e Bala (Persian: گيلوران بالا) (Note: Also romanized as Gīlvarān-e Bālā; also known as Gelvaran-e Bala, Gelvarān-e Bālā, and Gol Varān-e Bālā) is a village in Koregah-e Gharbi Rural District (Note: Formerly Koregah Rural District) of the Central District in Khorramabad County, Lorestan province, Iran.

== Demographics ==
=== Population ===
At the time of the 2006 National Census, the village's population was 726 in 145 households. The following census in 2011 counted 634 people in 175 households. The 2016 census measured the population of the village as 659 people in 188 households.
