= Peleh-ye Baba Hoseyn =

Village in Lorestan province, Iran

Peleh-ye Baba Hoseyn Persian: پله باباحسين
- Village
- Location within Iran
- Coordinates: 33°23′42″N 48°25′35″E
- Country: Iran
- Province: Lorestan
- County: Khorramabad
- District: Central
- Rural District: Koregah-e Sharqi

Population (2016)
  - Total: 727
- Time zone: UTC+3:30 (IRST)
- Area code: 066

Peleh-ye Baba Hossein (Persian: پله باباحسين) (Note: Also romanized as Palleh-ye Baba Hoseyn, Peleh-ye Bābā Ḩoseyn, and Poleh-ye Bābā Ḩoseyn; also known as Palābwāsil and Pali-Baba-Hussein) is a village in Koregah-e Sharqi Rural District of the Central District in Khorramabad County, Lorestan province, Iran. It lies to the southeast of Khorramabad, although the roads leading to it make the distance considerably further.

== Demographics ==
=== Population ===
At the time of the 2006 National Census, the village's population was 922 in 197 households. The following census in 2011 counted 852 people in 217 households. The 2016 census measured the population of the village as 727 people in 198 households.
