= Heydarabad, Khorramabad =

Village in Lorestan province, Iran

Heydarabad Persian: حيدراباد
- Village
- Location within Iran
- Coordinates: 33°22′34″N 48°37′09″E
- Country: Iran
- Province: Lorestan
- County: Khorramabad
- District: Central
- Rural District: Azna

Population (2016)
  - Total: 396
- Time zone: UTC+3:30 (IRST)

Heydarabad (Persian: حيدراباد) (Note: Also romanized as Ḩeydarābād; also known as Ḩeydar Kar) is a village in Azna Rural District of the Central District in Khorramabad County, Lorestan province, Iran.

== Demographics ==
=== Population ===
At the time of the 2006 National Census, the village's population was 467 in 76 households. The following census in 2011 counted 447 people in 110 households. The 2016 census measured the population of the village as 396 people in 112 households.
