= Sali-ye Bozorg =

Village in Lorestan province, Iran

Sali-ye Bozorg Persian: سالئ بزرگ
- Village
- Location within Iran
- Coordinates: 33°21′21″N 48°24′18″E
- Country: Iran
- Province: Lorestan
- County: Khorramabad
- District: Central
- Rural District: Koregah-e Sharqi

Population (2016)
  - Total: 841
- Time zone: UTC+3:30 (IRST)

Sali-ye Bozorg (Persian: سالئ بزرگ) (Note: Also romanized as Sālī-ye Bozorg; also known as Hazārgīri and Sālī) is a village in Koregah-e Sharqi Rural District of the Central District in Khorramabad County, Lorestan province, Iran.

== Demographics ==
=== Population ===
At the time of the 2006 National Census, the village's population was 883 in 162 households. The following census in 2011 counted 859 people in 222 households. The 2016 census measured the population of the village as 841 people in 211 households.
