= Kaveh Kali =

Village in Lorestan province, Iran

Kaveh Kali Persian: كاوه كالي
- Village
- Location within Iran
- Coordinates: 33°27′38″N 48°17′39″E
- Country: Iran
- Province: Lorestan
- County: Khorramabad
- District: Central
- Rural District: Koregah-e Gharbi

Population (2016)
  - Total: 649
- Time zone: UTC+3:30 (IRST)

Kaveh Kali (Persian: كاوه كالي) (Note: Also romanized as Kāveh Kālī; also known as Kokālī) is a village in Koregah-e Gharbi Rural District (Note: Formerly Koregah Rural District) of the Central District in Khorramabad County, Lorestan province, Iran.

== Demographics ==
=== Population ===
At the time of the 2006 National Census, the village's population was 197 in 33 households. The following census in 2011 counted 94 people in 27 households. The 2016 census measured the population of the village as 649 people in 189 households.
