= Sardarabad, Khorramabad =

Village in Lorestan province, Iran

Sardarabad Persian: سرداراباد
- Village
- Location within Iran
- Coordinates: 33°23′04″N 48°36′02″E
- Country: Iran
- Province: Lorestan
- County: Khorramabad
- District: Central
- Rural District: Azna

Population (2016)
  - Total: 832
- Time zone: UTC+3:30 (IRST)

Sardarabad (Persian: سرداراباد) (Note: Also romanized as Sardārābād) is a village in Azna Rural District of the Central District in Khorramabad County, Lorestan province, Iran.

== Demographics ==
=== Population ===
At the time of the 2006 National Census, the village's population was 750 in 151 households. The following census in 2011 counted 294 people in 80 households. The 2016 census measured the population of the village as 832 people in 237 households.
