= Chub Tarash, Lorestan =

Chub Tarash چوب تراش
- Village
- Location within Iran
- Coordinates: 33°20′48″N 48°25′13″E
- Country: Iran
- Province: Lorestan
- County: Khorramabad
- Bakhsh: Central
- Rural District: Koregah-e Sharqi

Population (2006)
  - Total: 410
- Time zone: UTC+3:30 (IRST)
  - Summer (DST): UTC+4:30 (IRDT)

Chub Tarash (Persian: چوب تراش, also Romanized as Chūb Tarāsh) is a village in Koregah-e Sharqi Rural District, in the Central District of Khorramabad County, Lorestan Province, Iran. At the 2006 census, its population was 410, in 81 families.
