= Sarab-e Yas =

Village in Lorestan province, Iran

Sarab-e Yas Persian: سرابياس
- Village
- Location within Iran
- Coordinates: 33°25′49″N 48°20′36″E
- Country: Iran
- Province: Lorestan
- County: Khorramabad
- District: Central
- Rural District: Koregah-e Gharbi

Population (2016)
  - Total: 2,582
- Time zone: UTC+3:30 (IRST)

Sarab-e Yas (Persian: سرابياس) (Note: Also romanized as Sarāb-e Yās and Sarabiās) is a village in Koregah-e Gharbi Rural District (Note: Formerly Koregah Rural District) of the Central District in Khorramabad County, Lorestan province, Iran.

== Demographics ==
=== Language ===
Laki is the commonly spoken language in the village.

=== Population ===
At the time of the 2006 National Census, the village's population was 1,155 in 232 households. The following census in 2011 counted 1,702 people in 431 households. The 2016 census measured the population of the village as 2,582 people in 714 households.

== Notable people ==
- Alireza Beiranvand, football goalkeeper
