= Gilavand =

Village in Lorestan province, Iran

Gilavand Persian: گيلاوند
- Village
- Location within Iran
- Coordinates: 33°22′06″N 48°35′28″E
- Country: Iran
- Province: Lorestan
- County: Khorramabad
- District: Central
- Rural District: Azna

Population (2016)
  - Total: 317
- Time zone: UTC+3:30 (IRST)

Gilavand (Persian: گيلاوند) (Note: Also romanized as Gīlāvand) is a village in Azna Rural District of the Central District in Khorramabad County, Lorestan province, Iran.

== Demographics ==
=== Population ===
At the time of the 2006 National Census, the village's population was 305 in 54 households. The following census in 2011 counted 335 people in 87 households. The 2016 census measured the population of the village as 317 people in 89 households.
