= Imanabad, Lorestan =

Village in Lorestan province, Iran

Imanabad Persian: ايمان اباد
- Village
- Location within Iran
- Coordinates: 33°23′04″N 48°36′25″E
- Country: Iran
- Province: Lorestan
- County: Khorramabad
- District: Central
- Rural District: Azna

Population (2016)
  - Total: 1,123
- Time zone: UTC+3:30 (IRST)

Imanabad (Persian: ايمان اباد) (Note: Also romanized as Īmānābād) is a village in, and the capital of, Azna Rural District in the Central District of Khorramabad County, Lorestan province, Iran.

== Demographics ==
=== Population ===
At the time of the 2006 National Census, the village's population was 1,282 in 228 households. The following census in 2011 counted 1,565 people in 411 households. The 2016 census measured the population of the village as 1,123 people in 318 households, the most populous in its rural district.
