= Dinarvand-e Bala =

Village in Lorestan province, Iran

Dinarvand-e Bala Persian: ديناروندبالا
- Village
- Location within Iran
- Coordinates: 33°23′40″N 48°21′43″E
- Country: Iran
- Province: Lorestan
- County: Khorramabad
- District: Central
- Rural District: Koregah-e Sharqi

Population (2016)
  - Total: 627
- Time zone: UTC+3:30 (IRST)

Dinarvand-e Bala (Persian: ديناروندبالا) (Note: Also romanized as Dīnārvand-e Bālā; formerly known as Dinarvand-e Olya (ديناروندعليا), also romanized as Dīnārvand-e ‘Olyā) is a village in, and the former capital of, Koregah-e Sharqi Rural District in the Central District of Khorramabad County, Lorestan province, Iran. The capital of the rural district has been transferred to the village of Darai.

== Demographics ==
=== Population ===
At the time of the 2006 National Census, the village's population, as Dinarvand-e Olya, was 940 in 184 households. The following census in 2011 counted 2,823 people in 248 households, by which time the village was listed as Dinarvand-e Bala. The 2016 census measured the population of the village as 627 people in 203 households.
