= Bahrami, Khorramabad =

Village in Lorestan province, Iran

Bahrami Persian: بهرامي
- Village
- Location within Iran
- Coordinates: 33°25′31″N 48°17′40″E
- Country: Iran
- Province: Lorestan
- County: Khorramabad
- District: Central
- Rural District: Koregah-e Gharbi

Population (2016)
  - Total: 4,097
- Time zone: UTC+3:30 (IRST)

Bahrami (Persian: بهرامي) (Note: Also romanized as Bahrāmī; also known as Badrābād-e Bālā and Badrābād-e ‘Olyā (بدرابادعليا)) is a village in Koregah-e Gharbi Rural District (Note: Formerly Koregah Rural District) of the Central District in Khorramabad County, Lorestan province, Iran.

== Demographics ==
=== Population ===
At the time of the 2006 National Census, the village's population was 3,728 in 772 households. The following census in 2011 counted 3,487 people in 906 households. The 2016 census measured the population of the village as 4,097 people in 1,145 households.
