= Deh-e Mohsen, Lorestan =

Village in Lorestan province, Iran

Deh-e Mohsen Persian: ده محسن
- Village
- Location within Iran
- Coordinates: 33°25′55″N 48°19′43″E
- Country: Iran
- Province: Lorestan
- County: Khorramabad
- District: Central
- Rural District: Koregah-e Gharbi

Population (2016)
  - Total: 5,216
- Time zone: UTC+3:30 (IRST)

Deh-e Mohsen (Persian: ده محسن) (Note: Also romanized as Deh-e Moḩsen) is a village in Koregah-e Gharbi Rural District (Note: Formerly Koregah Rural District) of the Central District in Khorramabad County, Lorestan province, Iran.

== Demographics ==
=== Population ===
At the time of the 2006 National Census, the village's population was 3,267 in 611 households. The following census in 2011 counted 5,917 people in 1,486 households. The 2016 census measured the population of the village as 5,216 people in 1,391 households, the most populous in its rural district.
