= Taluri-ye Sofla =

Village in Lorestan province, Iran

Taluri-ye Sofla Persian: تلوري سفلي
- Village
- Location within Iran
- Coordinates: 33°25′30″N 48°19′00″E
- Country: Iran
- Province: Lorestan
- County: Khorramabad
- District: Central
- Rural District: Koregah-e Gharbi

Population (2016)
  - Total: 3,531
- Time zone: UTC+3:30 (IRST)

Taluri-ye Sofla (Persian: تلوري سفلي) (Note: Also romanized as Talūrī-ye Soflá; also known as Telorī-ye Soflá, Talūrī, and Telorī) is a village in Koregah-e Gharbi Rural District (Note: Formerly Koregah Rural District) of the Central District in Khorramabad County, Lorestan province, Iran.

== Demographics ==
=== Population ===
At the time of the 2006 National Census, the village's population was 1,964 in 389 households. The following census in 2011 counted 2,739 people in 701 households. The 2016 census measured the population of the village as 3,531 people in 969 households.
