= Badrabad-e Pain =

Village in Lorestan province, Iran

Badrabad-e Pain Persian: بدرآباد پايين
- Village
- Location within Iran
- Coordinates: 33°25′37″N 48°16′56″E
- Country: Iran
- Province: Lorestan
- County: Khorramabad
- District: Central
- Rural District: Koregah-e Gharbi

Population (2016)
  - Total: 1,255
- Time zone: UTC+3:30 (IRST)

Badrabad-e Pain (Persian: بدرآباد پايين) (Note: Also romanized as Badrābād-e Pā’īn; formerly known as Badrabad-e Sofla (بدرابادسفلي), also romanized as Badrābād-e Soflá; also known as Badrābād) is a village in, and the capital of, Koregah-e Gharbi Rural District (Note: Formerly Koregah Rural District) in the Central District of Khorramabad County, Lorestan province, Iran.

== Demographics ==
=== Population ===
At the time of the 2006 National Census, the village's population, as Badrabad-e Sofla, was 1,293 in 266 households. The following census in 2011 counted 1,324 people in 352 households, by which time the village was listed as Badrabad-e Pain. The 2016 census measured the population of the village as 1,255 people in 354 households.
