= Darai, Iran =

Village in Lorestan province, Iran

Darai Persian: دارايي
- Village
- Location within Iran
- Coordinates: 33°24′23″N 48°20′54″E
- Country: Iran
- Province: Lorestan
- County: Khorramabad
- District: Central
- Rural District: Koregah-e Sharqi

Population (2016)
  - Total: 3,151
- Time zone: UTC+3:30 (IRST)

Darai (Persian: دارايي) (Note: Also romanized as Dārā’ī) is a village in, and the capital of, Koregah-e Sharqi Rural District in the Central District of Khorramabad County, Lorestan province, Iran. The previous capital of the rural district was the village of Dinarvand-e Bala.

== Demographics ==
=== Population ===
At the time of the 2006 National Census, the village's population was 2,726 in 552 households. The following census in 2011 counted 2,765 people in 697 households. The 2016 census measured the population of the village as 3,151 people in 823 households, the most populous in its rural district.
