= Sarab-e Changai =

Village in Lorestan province, Iran

Sarab-e Changai Persian: سراب چنگايي
- Village
- Location within Iran
- Coordinates: 33°28′24″N 48°16′19″E
- Country: Iran
- Province: Lorestan
- County: Khorramabad
- District: Central
- Rural District: Koregah-e Gharbi

Population (2016)
  - Total: 1,691
- Time zone: UTC+3:30 (IRST)

Sarab-e Changai (Persian: سراب چنگايي) (Note: Also romanized as Sarāb-e Changā’ī; formerly known as Changai (چنگايي), also romanized as Changā’ī; also known as Changā’ī-ye Aşgharābād, Changā’ī-ye Vasaţ, and Changūi Wast) is a village in Koregah-e Gharbi Rural District (Note: Formerly Koregah Rural District) of the Central District in Khorramabad County, Lorestan province, Iran.

== Demographics ==
=== Population ===
At the time of the 2006 National Census, the village's population, as Changai, was 1,207 in 229 households. The following census in 2011 counted 1,350 people in 369 households, by which time the village was listed as Sarab-e Changai. The 2016 census measured the population of the village as 1,691 people in 485 households.
