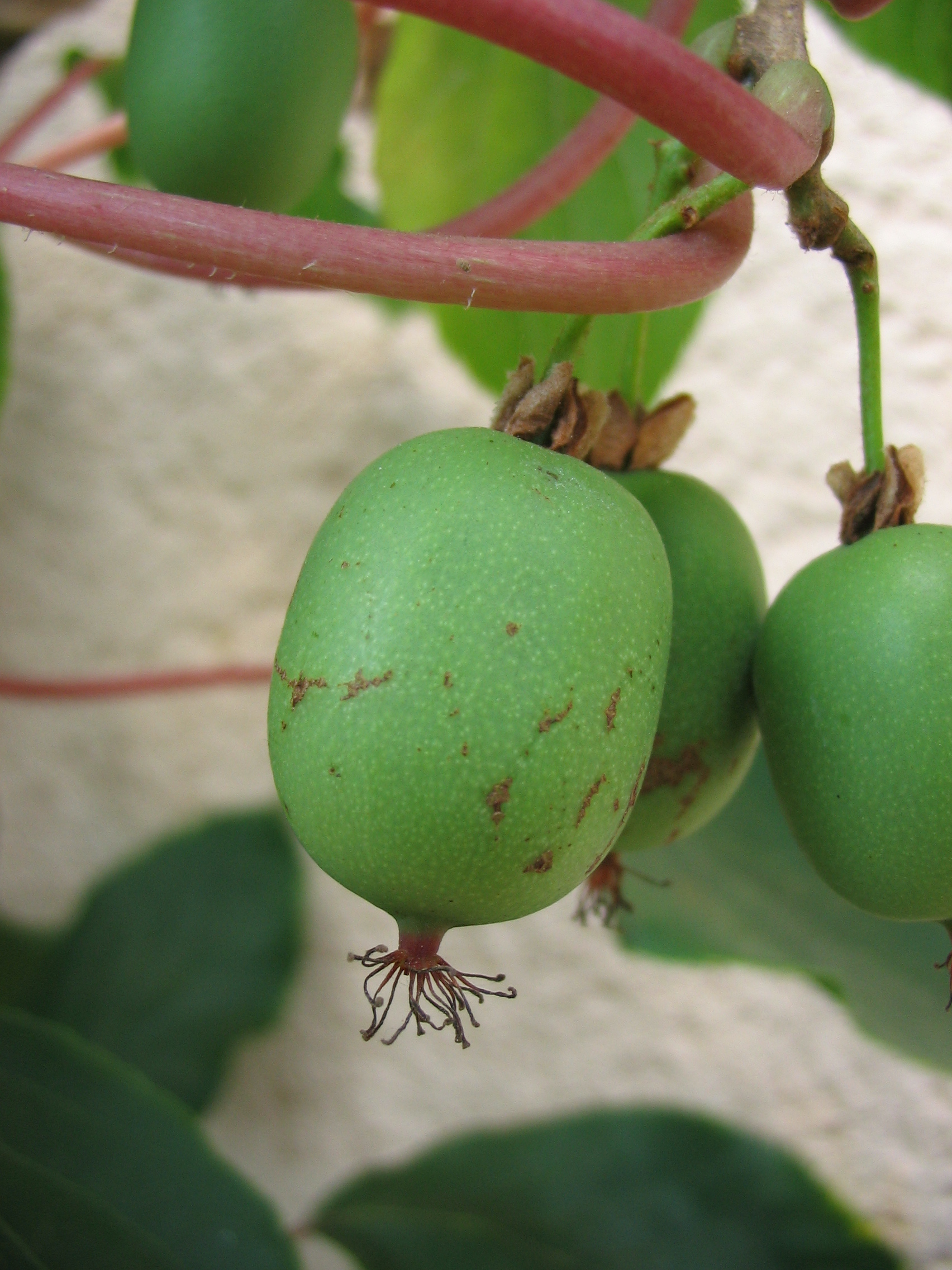

Scientific classification
- Kingdom: Plantae
- Clade: Tracheophytes
- Clade: Angiosperms
- Clade: Eudicots
- Clade: Asterids
- Order: Ericales
- Family: Actinidiaceae
- Genus: Actinidia
- Species: A. arguta

Binomial name
- Actinidia arguta (Siebold & Zucc.) Planch. ex Miq.

= Actinidia arguta =

Hardy kiwi

Species of plant

Actinidia arguta is a perennial vine native to Japan, Korea, Northern China, and the Russian Far East. The fruit is known as kiwiberry or hardy kiwi, which are small kiwifruits without the hair-like fiber covering the outside, unlike most other species of the genus.

== Description ==
The fruit is referred to as the kiwiberry, arctic kiwi, baby kiwi, cocktail kiwi, dessert kiwi, grape kiwi, hardy kiwifruit, northern kiwi, Siberian gooseberry, or Siberian kiwi, with the name kiwiberry gaining in popularity in the 2010s and 2020s. It is an edible, berry- or grape-sized fruit similar to kiwifruit in taste and appearance, but is green, brownish, or purple with smooth skin, sometimes with a red blush. Often sweeter and sharper-tasting than the kiwifruit, hardy kiwifruit can be eaten whole and do not need to be peeled. Thin-walled, its exterior is smooth and leathery.

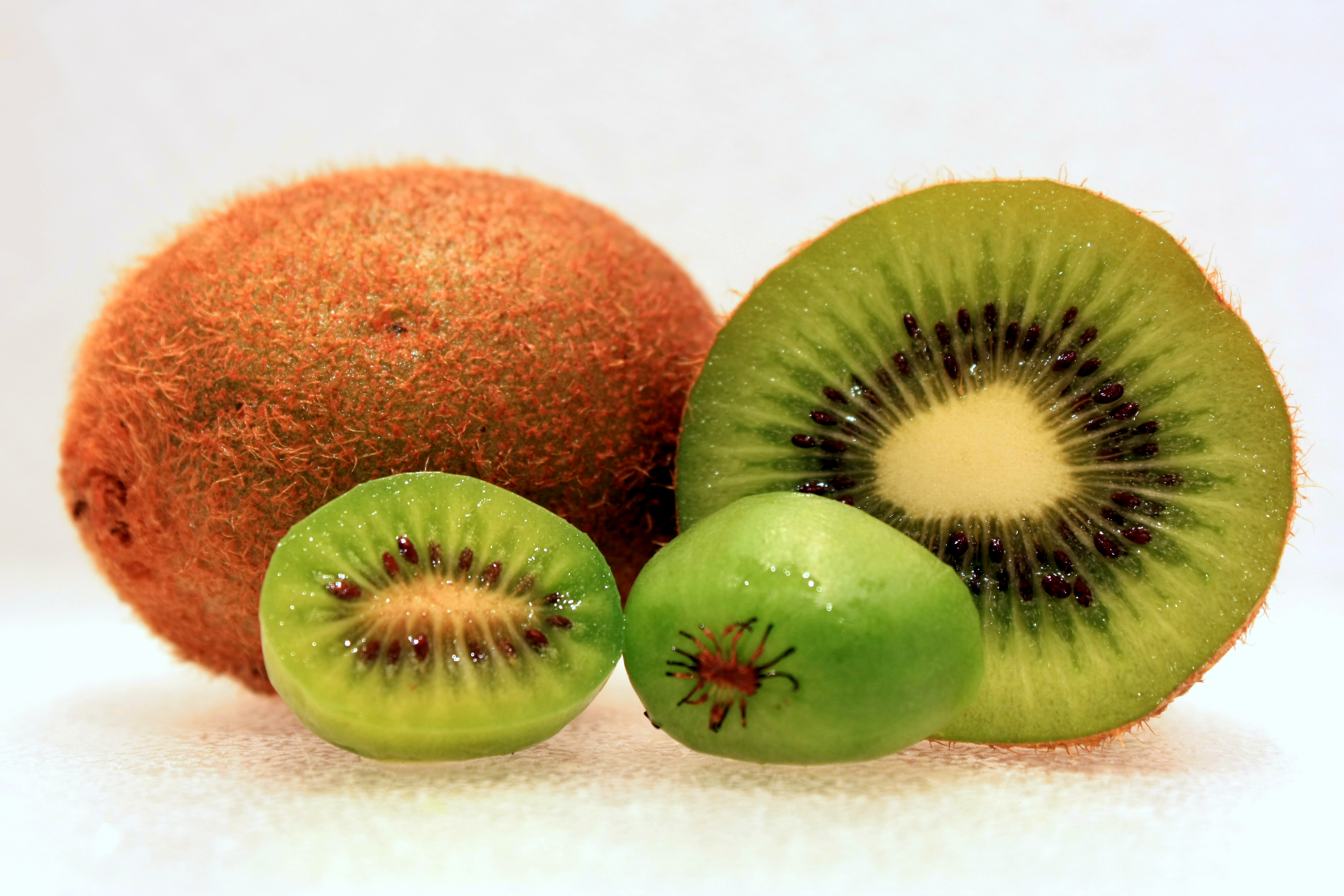
The larger kiwifruit in back compared to the smaller size of the hardy kiwi in front

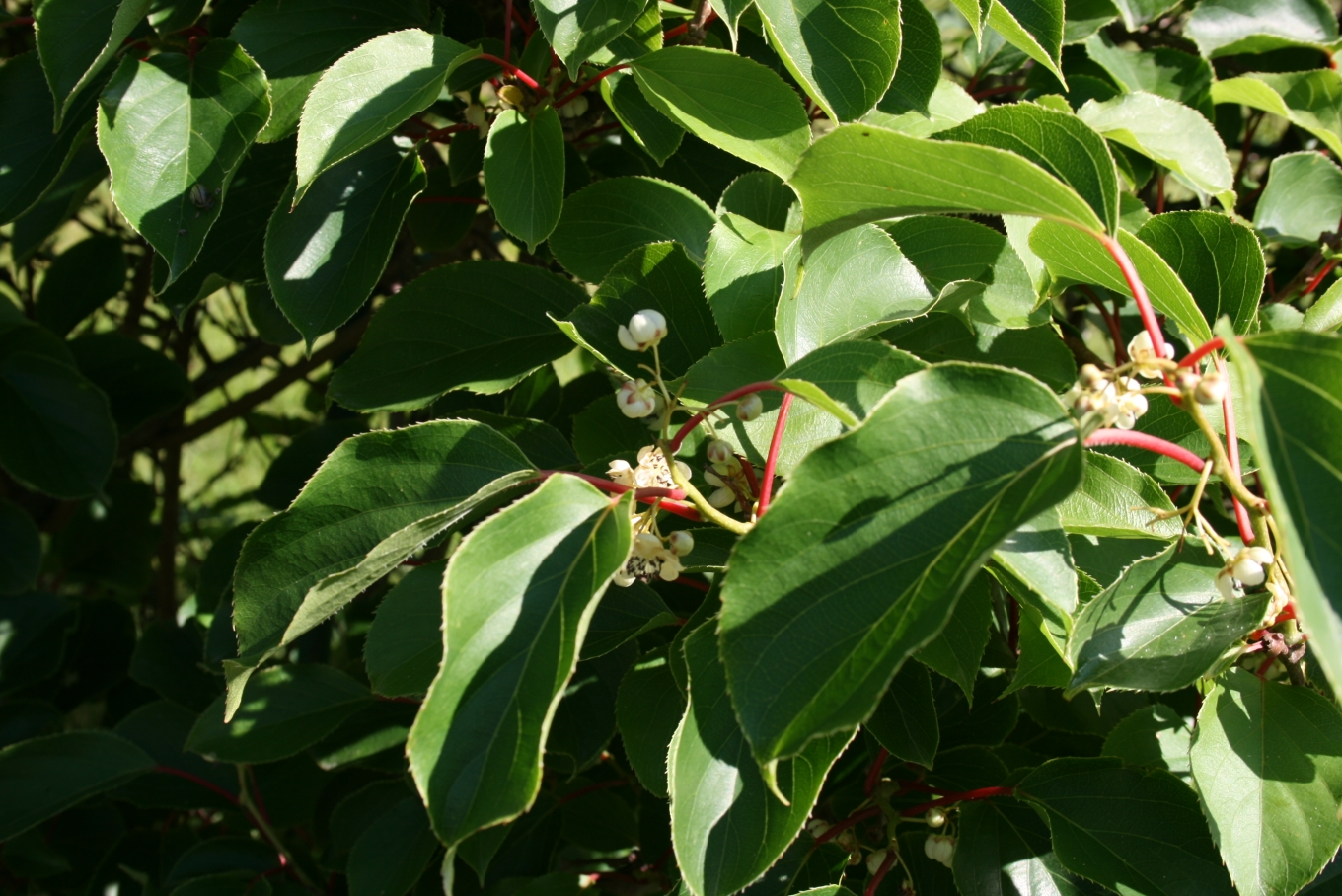
Leaves

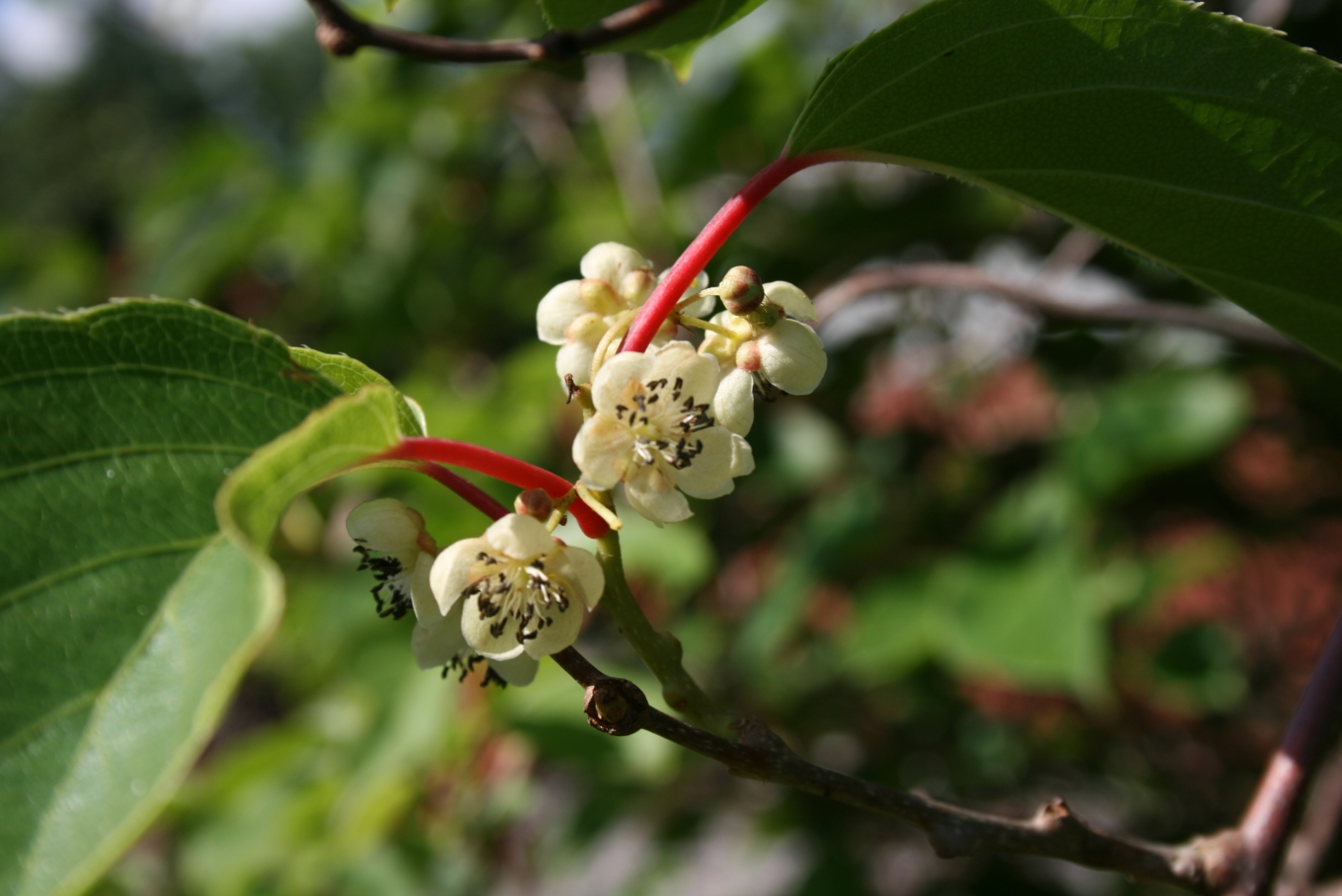
Flowers

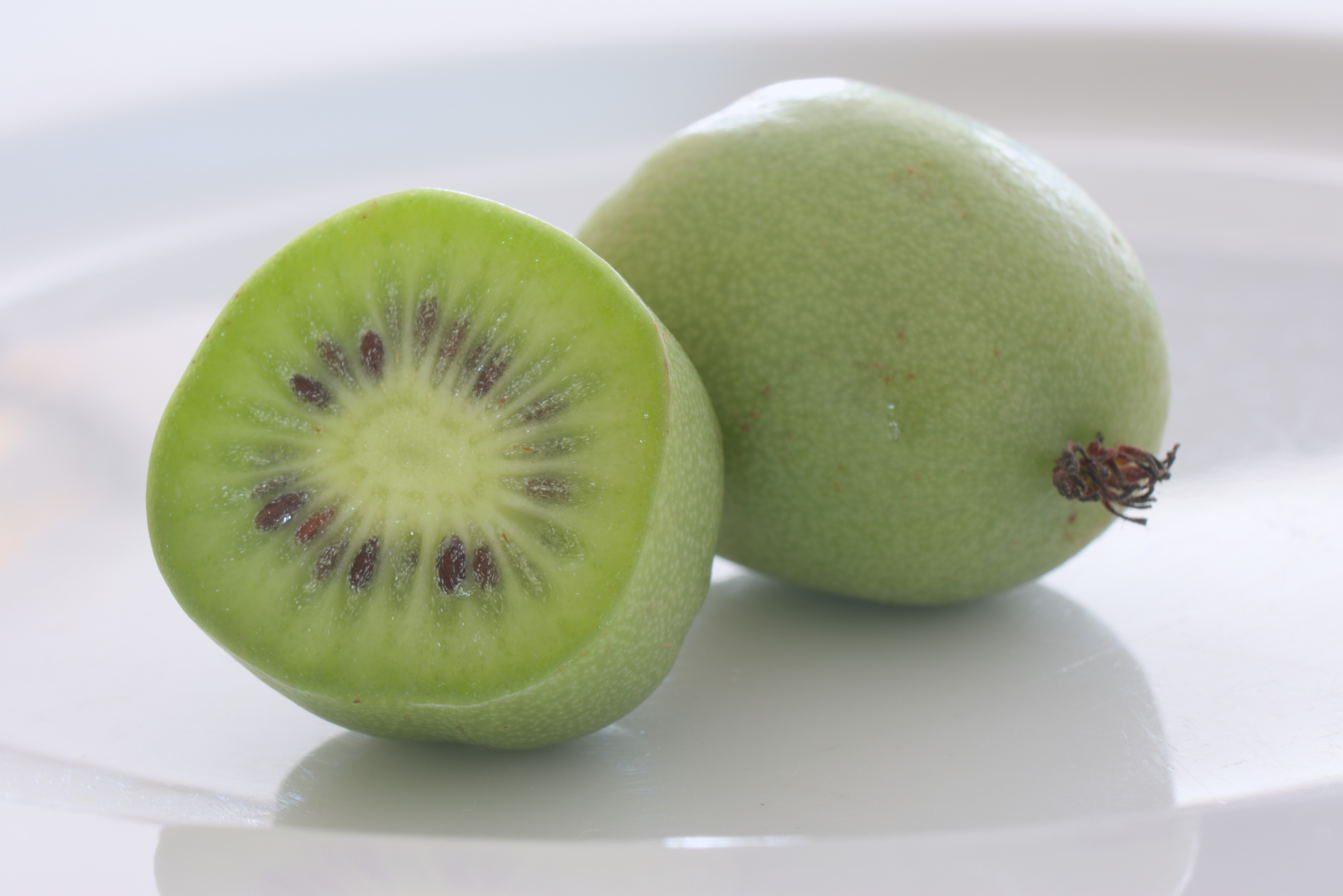
Fruits

== Taxonomy ==
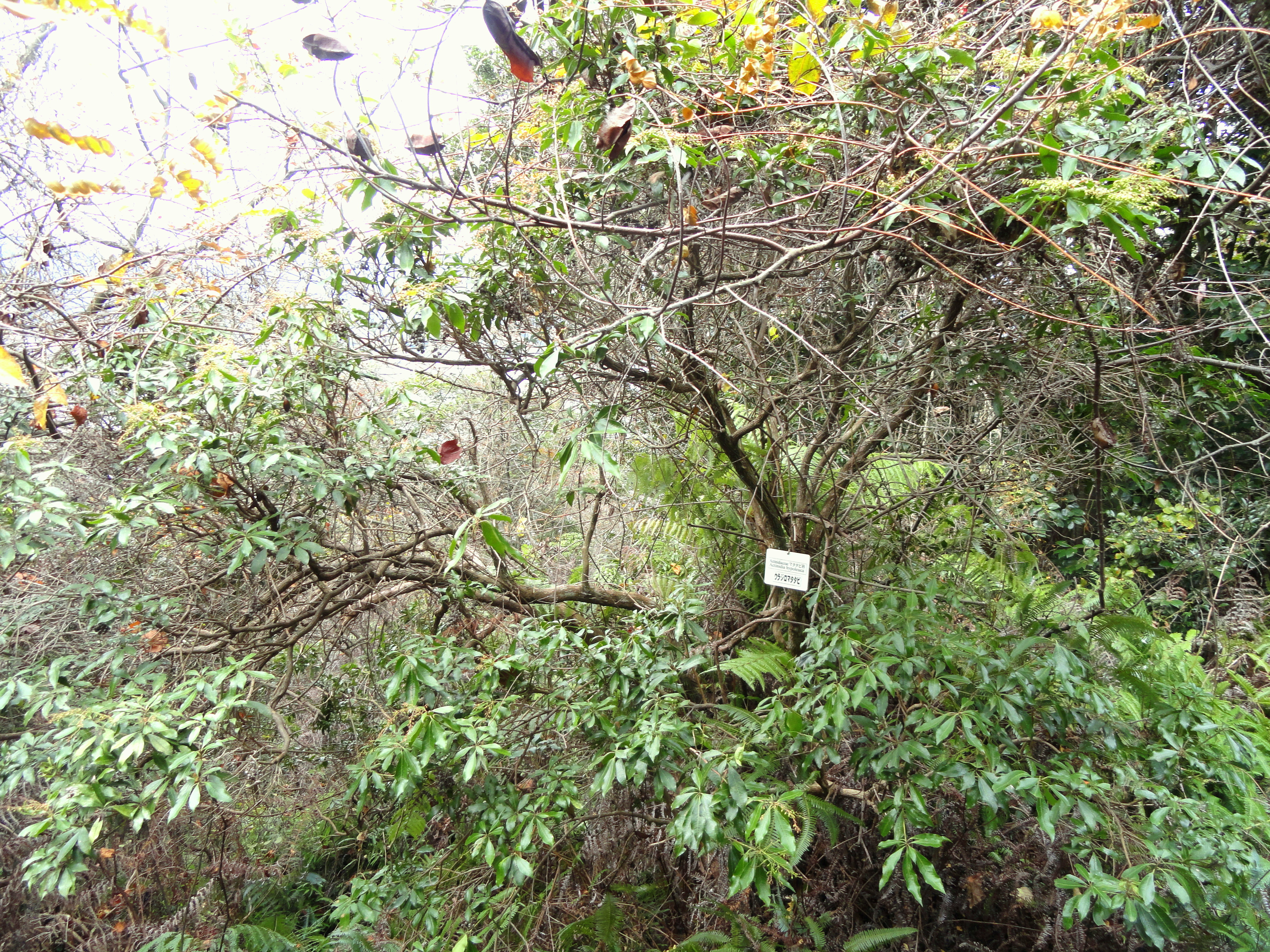
Actinidia arguta var. hypoleuca

Actinidia arguta was first described by Philipp Franz von Siebold and Joseph Gerhard Zuccarini in 1843 as Trochostigma argutum. It was then moved to the genus Actinidia in 1867 by Friedrich Anton Wilhelm Miquel after the invalidly published suggestion by Jules Émile Planchon to move the species.

=== Varieties ===
The species consists of three varieties:

- Actinidia arguta var. arguta (autonym)
- Actinidia arguta var. giraldii (Diels) Vorosch.
- Actinidia arguta var. hypoleuca (Nakai) Kitam.

Actinidia arguta var. giraldii was originally described by Ludwig Diels at the species rank (Actinidia giraldii) in 1905, but was later reduced to a variety of A. arguta in 1972 by Vladimir Nikolaevich Voroschilov. A. arguta var. hypoleuca was originally described at the species rank (Actinidia hypoleuca) by Takenoshin Nakai in 1904, but reduced to a variety of A. arguta in 1980 by Siro Kitamura. In 2007, Actinidia purpurea, the red hardy kiwi, was synonymised with Actinidia arguta var. arguta.

Actinidia arguta had been placed in section Leiocarpae and series Lamellatae, but this current infrageneric classification is unsupported. A 2002 study of the nuclear DNA internal transcribed spacer sequence and the plastid matK gene sequence for cladistic analysis revealed the current circumscription of the sections to be polyphyletic, with A. arguta forming a clade with A. melanandra near the base of the phylogenetic tree.

== Distribution and habitat ==
Actinidia arguta has one of the widest ranges of species within Actinidia, found across China, eastern Russia, Korea, Taiwan and Japan. The plant is found in significantly colder areas compared to most other Actinidia, typically between 150–1,500 m (490–4,920 ft) above sea level, including areas such as the Yan Mountains and northeastern Chinese provinces incluving Jilin and Liaoning. In southern Japan, the plant can grow at altitudes up to 1,900 m (6,200 ft) above sea level, and the plant has been recorded growing up to heights of 3,000 m (9,800 ft). The greatest number of wild records of Actinidia arguta come from central China, northeastern China, the Korean peninsula and Japan.

The plants can grow in both mountainous and forested areas, and can survive winter temperatures of −45 °C (−49 °F), and summer temperatures exceeding 37 °C (99 °F).

Macrofossils of A. arguta from the early Pliocene epoch have been found in western Georgia in the Caucasus region.

== Cultivation ==
=== Cultivars ===
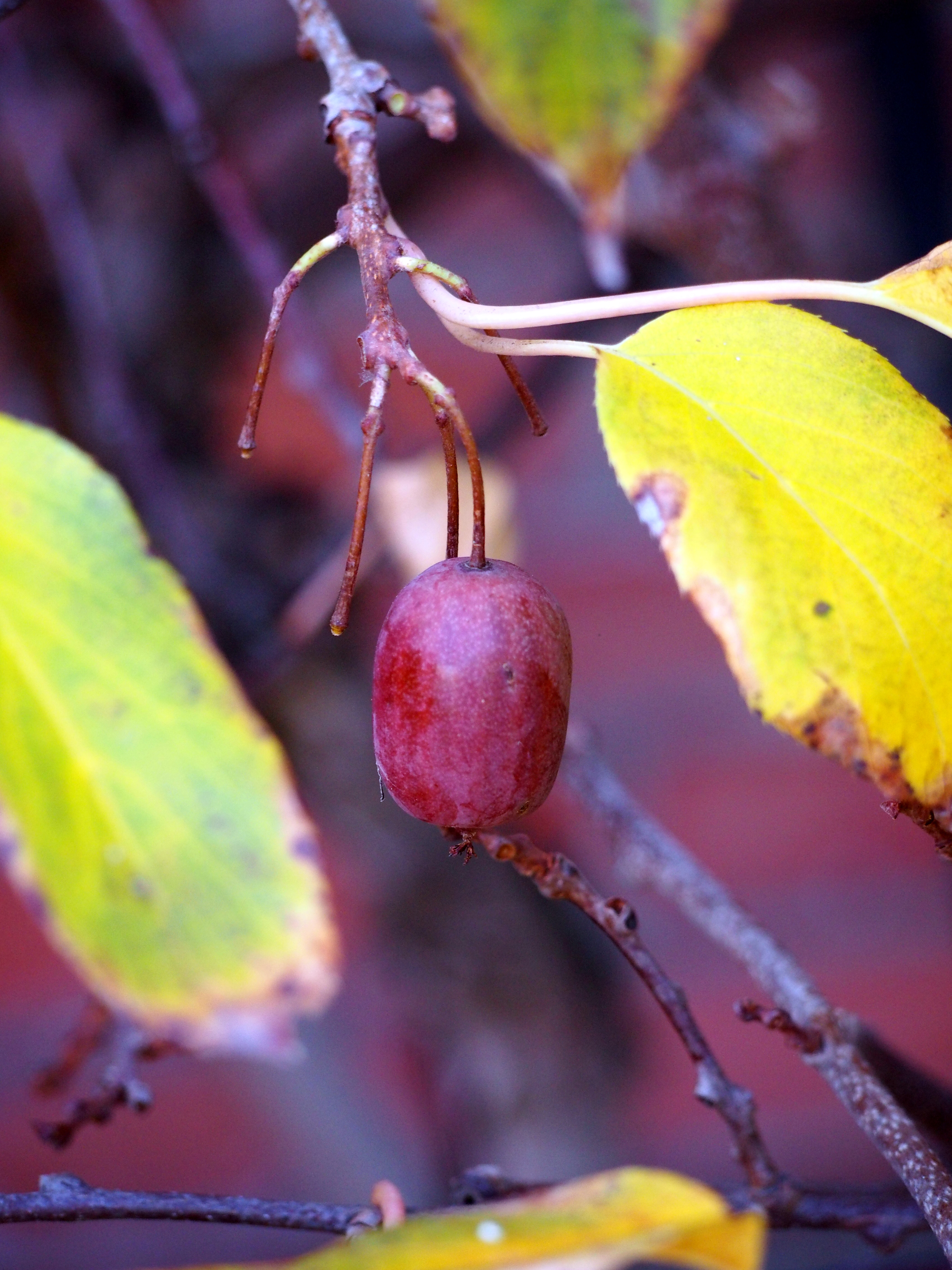
'Ken's Red', a hybrid cultivar of Actinidia arguta and Actinidia melanandra

Unlike kiwifruit, as of 2021 no single cultivar has been established as the predominant commercial cultivar. The most popular cultivars in China include 'Long Cheng No. 2', 'LD133', 'Kuilv', and 'Chang Jiang No. 1', while 'Ananasnaya' (syn. 'Jumbo Verde') is the most commonly grown cultivar in the United States and Chile. In Europe, the most popular cultivars include 'Weiki', 'Geneva', and two proprietary cultivars from New Zealand, 'Hortgem Tahi' and 'Hortgem Rua'. Other cultivars include 'MSU', 'Super Jumbo', 'Rogow', 'Kievskaya Krupnoplodnaya', 'Taezhniy Dar' and 'Estafeta'. A commonly sold self-fertile hybrid is the Japanese cultivar 'Issai' (A. arguta × polygama) and its offspring 'Super Issai', while the hybrid 'Ken's Red' (A. arguta × melanandra) originates from New Zealand.

Actinidia arguta was first cultivated in Europe and North America in the late 19th century as an ornamental plant. Some of the earliest seeds for European plantings were collected from Hokkaido, Japan, by William S. Clark in 1876.

The first commercial kiwiberry plantings were established in Oregon, United States, in the late 1990s. This was followed by small plantings in New Zealand, Chile, Italy, France, and Switzerland. Attempts to commercialize the fruit have been historically unsuccessful due to its short shelf-life and sporadic tendencies to ripen. However, attempts are being made to bring the fruit to greater bear, and commercial production initiatives are underway on a small scale in South America, New Zealand, Europe, Canada, and the United States (in Oregon, Washington, and central Pennsylvania). South Korea's National Institute of Forest Science(국립산림과학원) develops and distributes new hardy kiwi cultivars as a high-value crop. Relative ease of maintenance of the trees due to low height is seen as an advantage as a commercial crop.

The estimated total cultivation area for kiwiberry plantations in 2015 is 1,640 ha (4,100 acres), of which 1,260 ha (3,100 acres) was found in China. Between 2015 and 2019, an additional 2,300 ha (5,700 acres) of kiwiberry plantations were established in China. As of 2023, 45.4 t (44.7 long tons; 50.0 short tons) of kiwiberries were produced in South Korea, of which Gangwon Province accounted for around 30 t (30 long tons; 33 short tons).

=== Kazura bridges ===
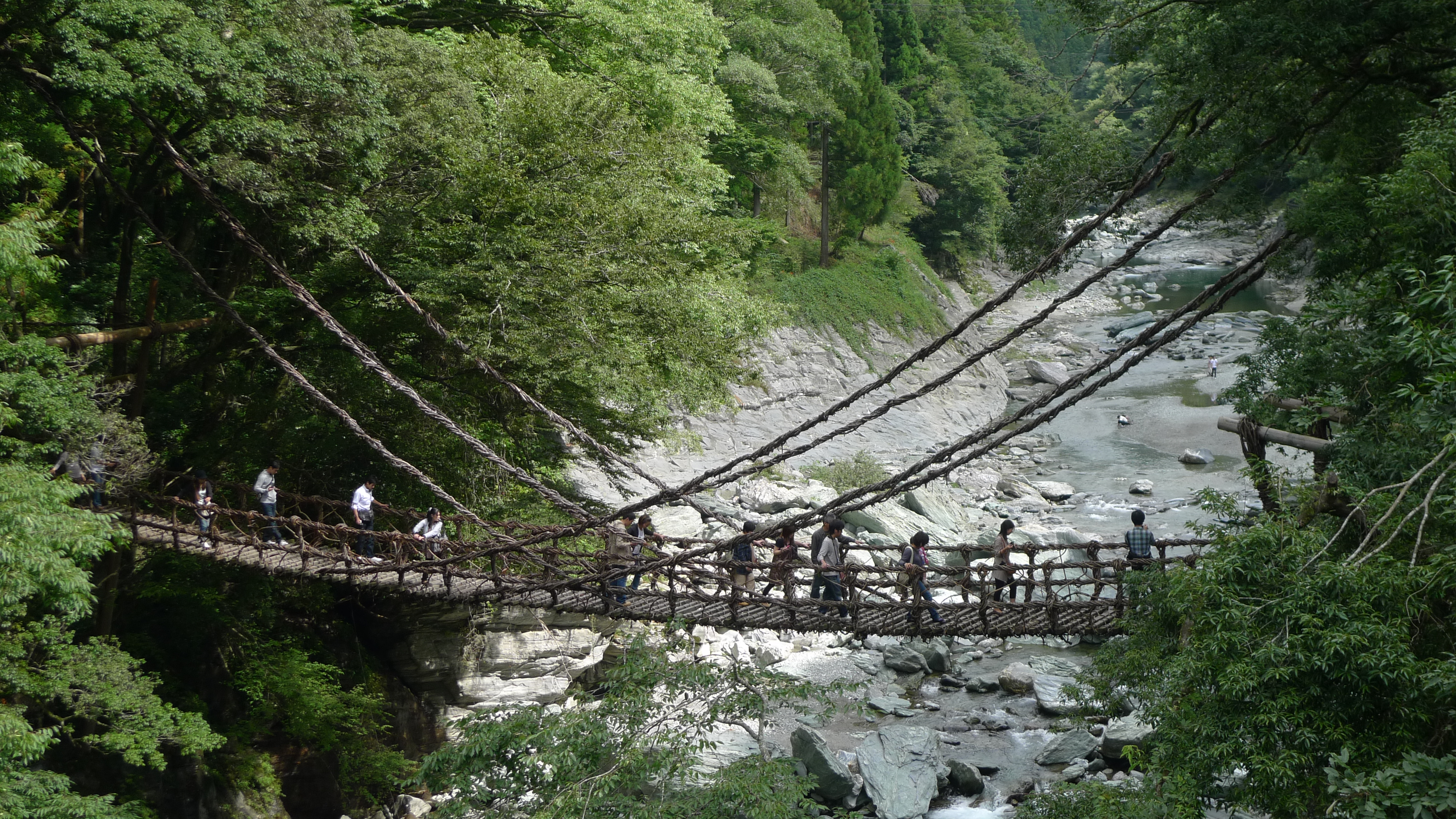
Iya Kazura Bridge in Miyoshi, Tokushima, constructed using Actinidia arguta vines

Kazura bridges (かずら橋) in Miyoshi, Tokushima, Japan are a suspension bridges made from Actinidia arguta vines. Legends suggest the first bridges were made by Kūkai or fugitives of the Heike clan, who could quickly cut the bridges if being pursued by people. Documents from the mid-17th century record between seven and thirteen kazura bridges in the Iya valley.

The most famous bridge is Iya Kazura Bridge (祖谷のかずら橋), which is 45 m (148 ft) in length and crosses the Iya River. Likely recorded in 1815, the Iya Kazura Bridge was entirely made from vines until it was replaced by a wire suspension bridge in the 1920s, in order for carts and vehicles to be able to cross the river. The vine bridge was rebuilt in 1928, fortified with steel wire for the safety of tourists. The vines of the bridge need to be replaced every three years.

Another kazura bridge was constructed in 1989 in Ikeda, Fukui, as a tourist attraction imitating the originals in Tokushima Prefecture.

=== Invasiveness in the United States ===
By the 2010s, vines of unknown genotype and provenance were reported by groups including Mass Audubon to be invasive in the United States, where Actinidia arguta vines have been seen to have rampant overgrowth and "complete domination of mature trees" at sites in western Massachusetts and Coffin Woods and North Shore Wildlife Sanctuary in Long Island, New York. Whether such localized sites indicate an invasive risk for the region as a whole is controversial, given the long history of this widely distributed and cultivated species in the northeastern United States. Since successful invasions of non-native species can occur gradually over time, these reported sites warrant further investigation and suggest the need for more widespread monitoring.

== Cultivation techniques ==
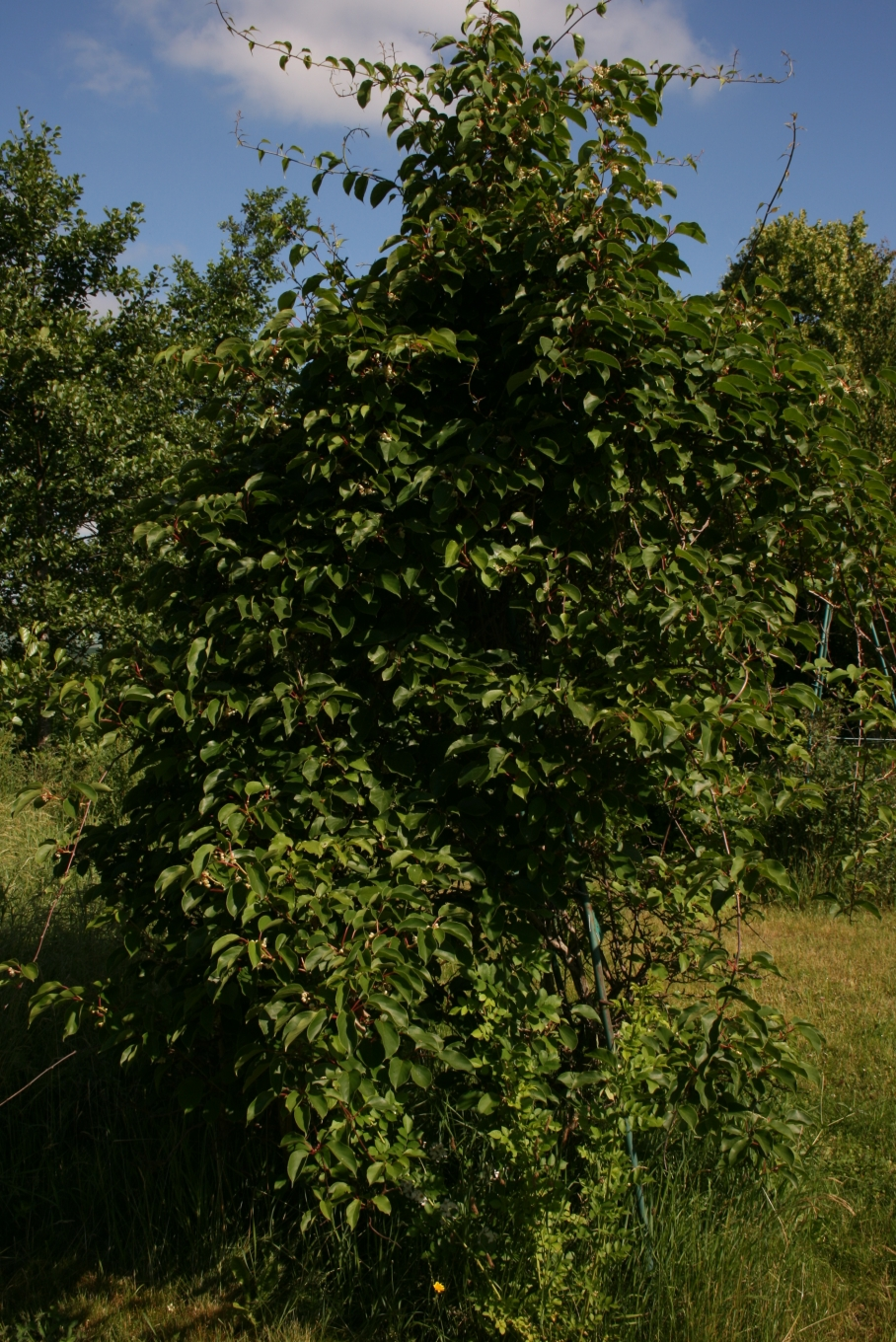
Cultivated vine trained on a trellis

The fast-growing, climbing, twining vine (bine) is very hardy (hence the name hardy kiwi), and is capable of surviving slow temperature drops to −45 °C (−49 °F), and summer temperatures exceeding 37 °C (99 °F), although young shoots can be vulnerable to frost in the spring. The vines need a frost-free growing season of about 150 days, but are not damaged by late freezes, provided that temperature changes are sufficiently gradual to allow plants to acclimate. Indeed, a period of winter chill is necessary for successful cultivation. However, rapid freezes kill off buds and split vines. The vines can also be grown in low-chill areas.

While hardy kiwi may be grown directly from seeds (germination time is about one month), propagating from cuttings is also possible. Growing from seeds needs a period of cold stratification of one to two months to germinate. Hardy kiwi cuttings may be grafted directly onto established kiwifruit rootstock, or rooted themselves.

In domestic cultivation, a trellis may be used to encourage horizontal growth for easy maintenance and harvesting; however, vines grow extremely quickly and require a strong trellis for support. Each vine can grow up to 20 ft (6.1 m) in a single season, given ideal growing conditions. For commercial planting, placement is important: plants can tolerate partial shade, but yields are optimized with full sunlight. Hardy kiwi vines consume large volumes of water; therefore, they are usually grown in well-drained, acidic soils to prevent root rot.

=== Pollination and harvest ===
For vines to bear fruit, both male and female plants must be present to enable pollination. A male pollinator can enable six female producers to fruit. Flowering typically occurs in late spring (May in the Northern Hemisphere) starting in the third year of growth. If flowers become frost-burned, however, no fruit production will occur during the remainder of the year.

An autumn harvest is standard among all varieties; within this, actual harvest times are highly dependent on local climate and the specific cultivar grown. Each individual female vine can produce up to 100 pounds of fruit per year, but average annual yield is roughly 50 lb per vine. Both fruit size and total yield are highly cultivar-dependent. Fruit left to ripen on the vine has an 18 to 25% sugar content at time of harvest. Some hardy kiwifruit varieties may benefit from harvesting after a frost, a form of bletting.

=== Pests ===
Hardy kiwi vines are vulnerable to several botanical diseases, including phytophthora crown and root rot (the most serious problem), botrytis rot, and sclerotinia blight. Vines are also vulnerable to pest infestations, including root knot nematodes, two-spotted spider mites, leaf rollers, thrips, and Japanese beetles. Cats can also pose a problem, as they are attracted to a catnip-like smell produced by the hardy kiwi vines. Cats have been known to destroy vines and dig up roots in search of the source of the scent.

== Culinary use ==
Hardy kiwifruit, fresh, raw
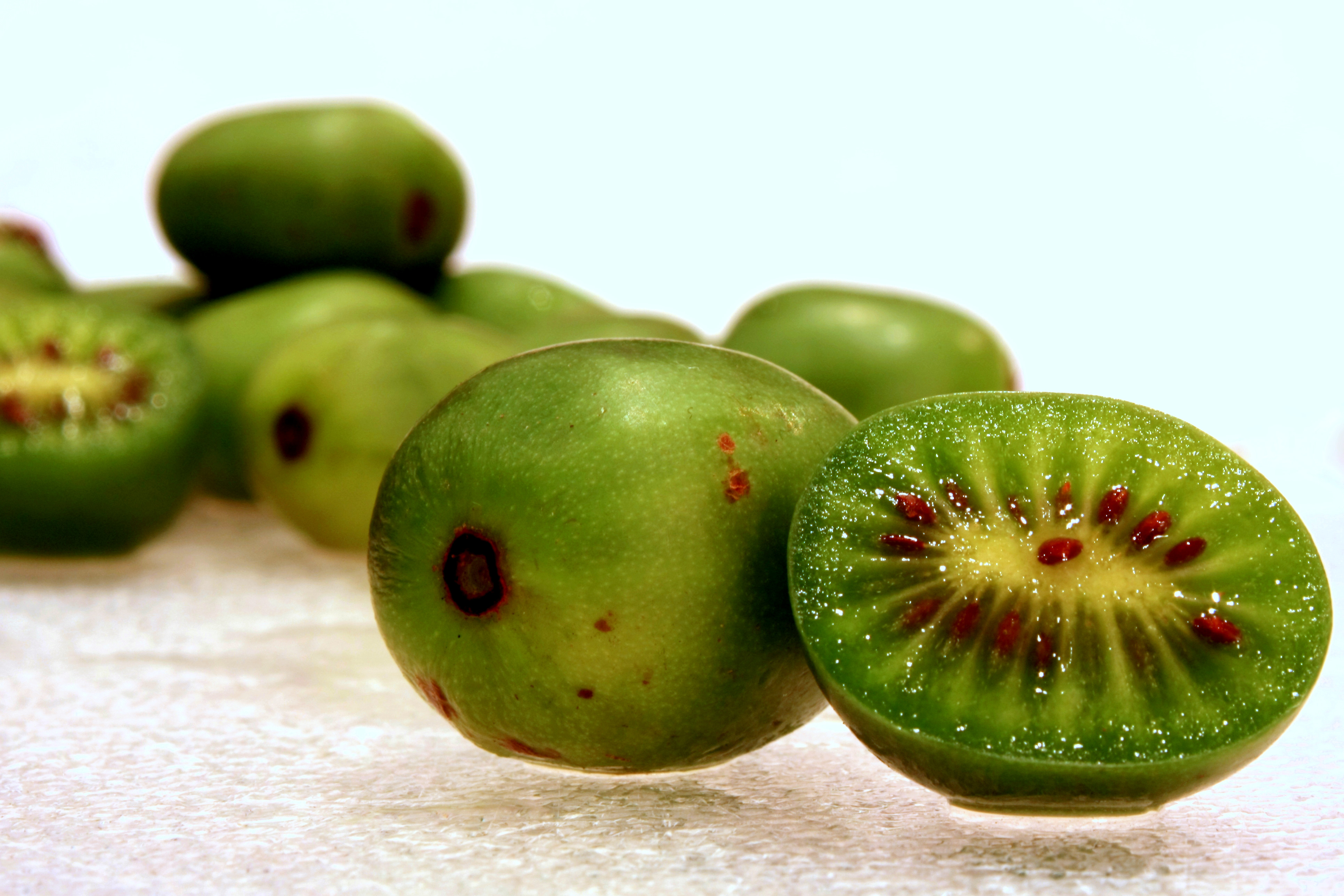
- Cross-sectioned and whole hardy kiwifruit (Actinidia arguta)

Nutritional value per 100 g (3.5 oz)
- Energy: 322 kJ (77 kcal)
- Carbohydrates: 18 g
- Sugars: 7.6 g
- Dietary fiber: 3 g
- Fat: 0.6 g
- Protein: 1.2 g
Vitamins and minerals
Vitamins	Quantity %DV^{†}
Vitamin C	103% 93 mg
Minerals	Quantity %DV^{†}
Potassium	10% 288 mg
Sodium	0% 6 mg
- ^{†}Percentages estimated using US recommendations for adults, except for potassium, which is estimated based on expert recommendation from the National Academies. Source: NZ KiwiBerry Growers Inc. Nutritional Value

Kiwiberries are primarily produced for the fresh fruit market, sold in small punnets as a ready-to-eat fruit. Kiwiberries are also processed into jams, preserved fruit and juices. In China, kiwiberry food additives such as nutritional powders and fruit vinegars are commercially available, and kiwiberry wines are produced in the United States.

In Korea, kiwiberries are known as darae (다래). Young leaves, called darae-sun, are often consumed as namul vegetable. The vines can be tapped in early spring to gather sap, which migratory farmers in Gangwon province are said to have used as a food source during famines.

=== Gallery ===
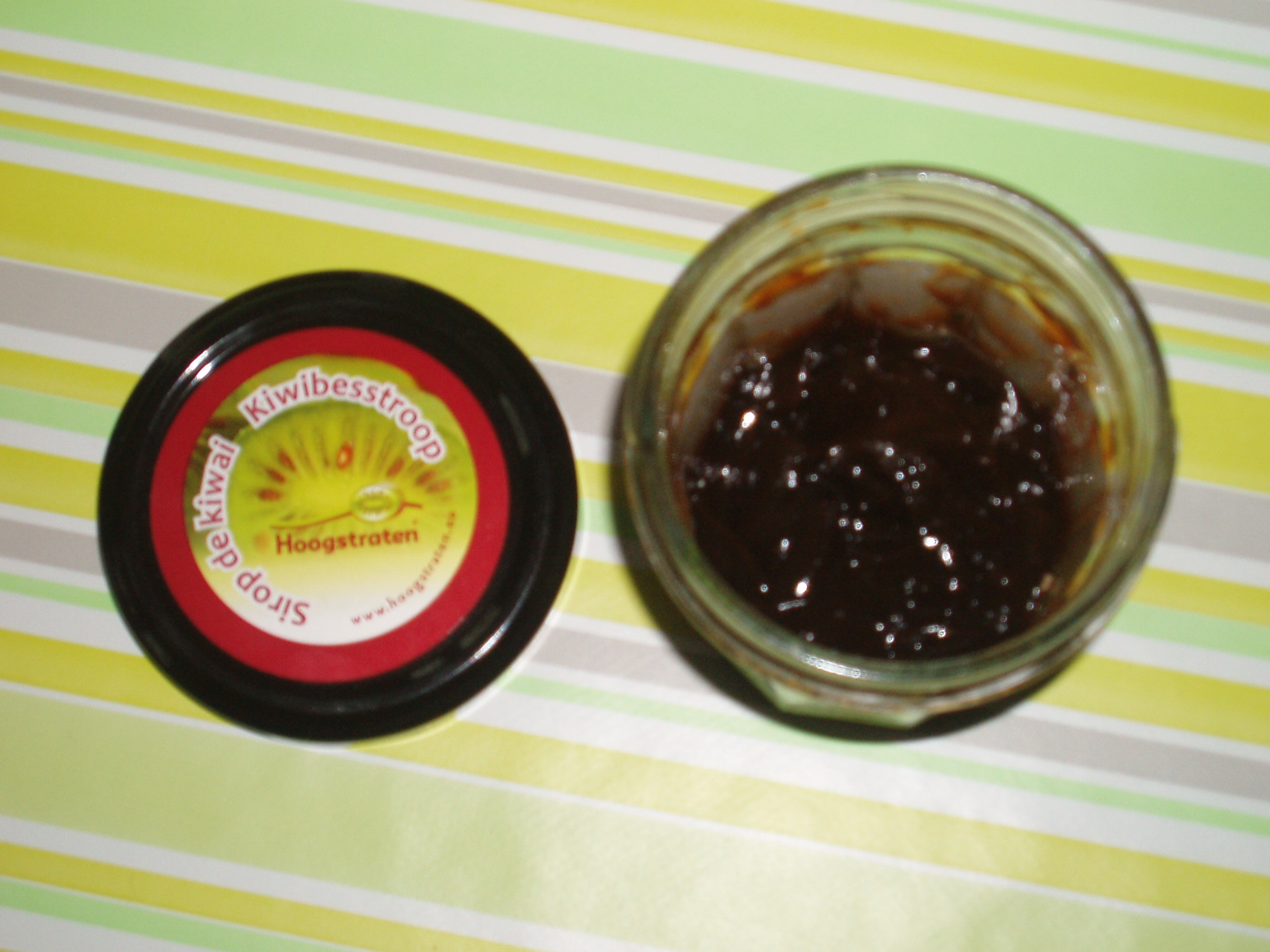
Kiwiberry jam

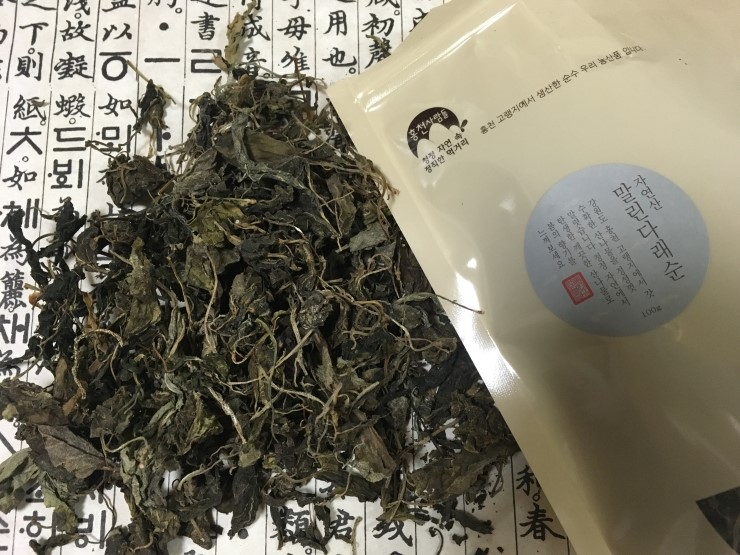
Dried young leaves, sold as namul vegetable

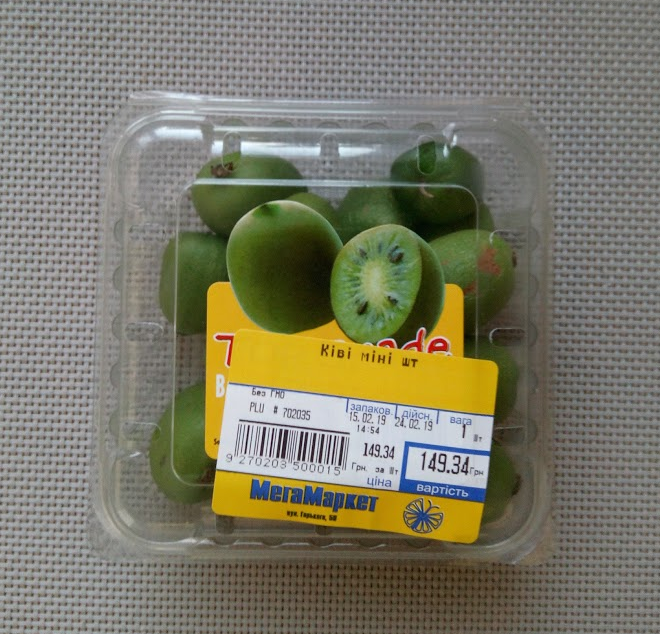
Kiwiberry punnet sold in Ukraine

== See also ==
- Actinidia chinensis var. deliciosa, the fuzzy kiwifruit

== Bibliography ==
- Latocha, Piotr; Debersaques, Filip; Hale, Iago (2 April 2021). "Actinidia arguta (Kiwiberry): Botany, Production, Genetics, Nutritional Value, and Postharvest Handling". In Warrington, Ian (ed.). Horticultural Reviews, Volume 48. John Wiley & Sons, Inc. doi:10.1002/9781119750802. ISBN 978-1-119-75080-2.
