= Mian Golal =

Village in Lorestan province, Iran

Mian Golal Persian: ميان گلال
- Village
- Location within Iran
- Country: Iran
- Province: Lorestan
- County: Khorramabad
- District: Central
- Rural District: Koregah-e Gharbi

Population (2016)
  - Total: 2,160
- Time zone: UTC+3:30 (IRST)

Mian Golal (Persian: ميان گلال) (Note: Also romanized as Mīān Golāl; formerly known as Chub Tarash Mian Golal (چوبتراش ميان گلال), also romanized as Chūb Tarāsh Mīān Golāl; also known as Chūb Tarāsh and Mīāngelāl-e Chūb Tarāsh) is a village in Koregah-e Gharbi Rural District (Note: Formerly Koregah Rural District) of the Central District in Khorramabad County, Lorestan province, Iran.

== Demographics ==
=== Population ===
At the time of the 2006 National Census, the village's population, as Chub Tarash Mian Golal, was 1,418 in 271 households. The following census in 2011 counted 1,323 people in 360 households, by which time the village was listed as Mian Golal. The 2016 census measured the population of the village as 2,160 people in 578 households.
