= Dinarvand-e Pain =

Village in Lorestan province, Iran

Dinarvand-e Pain Persian: ديناروندپايين
- Village
- Location within Iran
- Coordinates: 33°23′45″N 48°21′38″E
- Country: Iran
- Province: Lorestan
- County: Khorramabad
- District: Central
- Rural District: Koregah-e Sharqi

Population (2016)
  - Total: 625
- Time zone: UTC+3:30 (IRST)

Dinarvand-e Pain (Persian: ديناروندپايين) (Note: Also romanized as Dīnārvand-e Pā’īn; formerly known as Dinarvand-e Sofla (ديناروندسفلي), also romanize]]d as Dīnārvand-e Soflá) is a village in Koregah-e Sharqi Rural District of the Central District in Khorramabad County, Lorestan province, Iran.

== Demographics ==
=== Population ===
At the time of the 2006 National Census, the village's population, as Dinarvand-e Sofla, was 409 in 82 households. The following census in 2011 counted 406 people in 108 households, by which time the village was listed as Dinarvand-e Pain. The 2016 census measured the population of the village as 625 people in 167 households.
