= Taluri-ye Olya =

Village in Lorestan province, Iran

Taluri-ye Olya Persian: تلوري عليا
- Village
- Location within Iran
- Coordinates: 33°24′38″N 48°18′21″E
- Country: Iran
- Province: Lorestan
- County: Khorramabad
- District: Central
- Rural District: Koregah-e Gharbi

Population (2016)
  - Total: 1,643
- Time zone: UTC+3:30 (IRST)

Taluri-ye Olya (Persian: تلوري عليا) (Note: Also romanized as Talūrī-ye ‘Olyā; also known as Telorī-ye ‘Olyā, Talūarī, and Talūrī) is a village in Koregah-e Gharbi Rural District (Note: Formerly Koregah Rural District) of the Central District in Khorramabad County, Lorestan province, Iran.

== Demographics ==
=== Population ===
At the time of the 2006 National Census, the village's population was 1,485 in 292 households. The following census in 2011 counted 1,560 people in 426 households. The 2016 census measured the population of the village as 1,643 people in 446 households.
