= Badrabad-e Chahgavari =

Badrabad-e Chahgavari بدرابادچه گواري
- Village
- Location within Iran
- Coordinates: 28°40′30″N 58°54′31″E
- Country: Iran
- Province: Kerman
- County: Rigan
- Bakhsh: Gonbaki
- Rural District: Gonbaki

Population (2006)
  - Total: 154
- Time zone: UTC+3:30 (IRST)
  - Summer (DST): UTC+4:30 (IRDT)

Badrabad-e Chahgavari (Persian: بدرابادچه گواري, also Romanized as Badrābād-e Chahgavārī; also known as Badrābād, Badrābād-e Chegūrī, and Bāqerābād) is a village in Gonbaki Rural District, Gonbaki District, Rigan County, Kerman Province, Iran. At the 2006 census, its population was 154, in 33 families.
