= Badrabad, Narmashir =

Badrabad بدراباد
- Village
- Location within Iran
- Coordinates: 28°54′37″N 58°42′08″E
- Country: Iran
- Province: Kerman
- County: Narmashir
- Bakhsh: Central
- Rural District: Azizabad

Population (2006)
  - Total: 1,232
- Time zone: UTC+3:30 (IRST)
  - Summer (DST): UTC+4:30 (IRDT)

Badrabad (Persian: بدراباد, also Romanized as Badrābād; also known as Baz̄rābād) is a village in Azizabad Rural District, in the Central District of Narmashir County, Kerman Province, Iran. At the 2006 census, its population was 1,232, in 289 families.
