= Chub Tarash, West Azerbaijan =

Chub Tarash چوب تراش
- Village
- Location within Iran
- Coordinates: 37°30′01″N 45°10′10″E
- Country: Iran
- Province: West Azerbaijan
- County: Urmia
- Bakhsh: Central
- Rural District: Torkaman

Population (2006)
  - Total: 266
- Time zone: UTC+3:30 (IRST)
  - Summer (DST): UTC+4:30 (IRDT)

Chub Tarash (Persian: چوب تراش, also Romanized as Chūb Tarāsh) is a village in Torkaman Rural District, in the Central District of Urmia County, West Azerbaijan Province, Iran. At the 2006 census, its population was 266, in 72 families.
