= Garisan (Gyeonggi) =

Mountain in South Korea

Highest point
- Elevation: 774.3 m (2,540 ft)
- Coordinates: 38.037749°N 127.403469°E

Geography
- Location: South Korea

Korean name
- Hangul: 가리산
- Hanja: 加里山
- RR: Garisan
- MR: Karisan

Garisan (Korean: 가리산) is a mountain in Gyeonggi Province, South Korea. Its sits on the boundary between Pocheon and Gapyeong County. Garisan has an elevation of 774.3 m (2,540 ft).

== See also ==
- List of mountains in Korea
