= Headway Devon =

English charity

Headway Devon is a charity located in Devon, England, that provides care, support, and rehabilitation for adults who are affected by brain injuries. As an independent registered charity, it is affiliated with the national charity Headway.

The charity's primary objective is to help clients and their families adjust to the physical and psychological changes that follow brain injuries. Headway Devon offers social rehabilitation opportunities at its locations across Devon. Additionally, the charity employs a team of community support workers who provide assistance to clients in their own homes and communities.

== Centre-based rehabilitation ==
The charity's approach towards brain injury rehabilitation is centred on providing a safe, relaxed, and pressure-free environment through its Centre-based rehabilitation programmes. The charity's rehabilitation programmes incorporate therapeutic activities, workshops, and group sessions, as well as social contact for individuals who are recovering from brain injuries. Additionally, the centre offers respite to full-time careers, who require temporary relief from their caregiving duties. Prior to attending the centre, the charity conducts an assessment and develops a care plan in collaboration with the individual to enable staff to work towards mutual rehabilitation objectives. Centre attendance can contribute to the restoration of meaningful daily activities, as well as provide an opportunity for social contact for those who have become socially isolated. The charity operates several Headway Devon Centres, located in Exeter, Honiton, and South Devon, where individuals can avail of the rehabilitation programmes and services.

== Community support ==
Community support is a service that provides one-to-one assistance to individuals in their homes and communities. The service is staffed by trained specialists whose primary objective is to enhance independent living skills and promote social inclusion. Typically, this is achieved through a range of services, including help with housing issues, assisted shopping, budgeting, and liaison with outside agencies. Community support may also involve a wide variety of activities and tasks designed to facilitate the rehabilitation process, including a return to employment, whether paid or voluntary. Each community support program is tailored to the individual's specific needs and preferences.

Headway Devon is governed by a Board of Trustees, including several client representatives. According to the accounts published by the Charity Commission, the charity's income for the fiscal year ending March 2008 was £578,727, which was generated from a combination of grants from local social services, payments for services provided, and fundraising efforts.
