= Badrabad, Kurdistan =

Badrabad بدر آباد
- Village
- Location within Iran
- Coordinates: 36°13′19″N 46°20′33″E
- Country: Iran
- Province: Kurdistan
- County: Saqqez
- Bakhsh: Central
- Rural District: Sara

Population (2006)
  - Total: 167
- Time zone: UTC+3:30 (IRST)
  - Summer (DST): UTC+4:30 (IRDT)

Badrabad (Persian: بدر آباد, also Romanized as Badrābād) is a village in Sara Rural District in the Central District of Saqqez County, Kurdistan Province, Iran. As of the 2006 census, its population was 167, with 29 families. The village is populated by Kurds.
