= Garisan (Gangwon) =

Mountain in Gangwon, South Korea

Highest point
- Elevation: 1,050.7 m (3,447 ft)
- Coordinates: 37°52′17″N 127°57′23″E

Geography
- Location: South Korea

Korean name
- Hangul: 가리산
- Hanja: 加里山
- RR: Garisan
- MR: Karisan

Garisan (Korean: 가리산) is a mountain in Gangwon Province, South Korea. It sits on the boundary between Chuncheon and Hongcheon County. Garisan has an elevation of 1,050.7 m (3,447 ft).

== See also ==
- List of mountains in Korea
