= Azna Rural District =

Rural district in Lorestan province, Iran

Azna Rural District Persian: دهستان ازنا
- Rural District
- Location within Iran
- Coordinates: 33°24′N 48°36′E
- Country: Iran
- Province: Lorestan
- County: Khorramabad
- District: Central
- Established: 1987
- Capital: Imanabad

Population (2016)
  - Total: 5,859
- Time zone: UTC+3:30 (IRST)

Azna Rural District (Persian: دهستان ازنا) is in the Central District of Khorramabad County, Lorestan province, Iran. Its capital is the village of Imanabad.

== Demographics ==
=== Population ===
At the time of the 2006 National Census, the rural district's population was 6,214 in 1,200 households. There were 6,190 inhabitants in 1,574 households at the following census of 2011. The 2016 census measured the population of the rural district as 5,859 in 1,697 households. The most populous of its 33 villages was Imanabad, with 1,123 people.

=== Other villages in the rural district ===
- Aliabad (eastern)
- Aliabad (western)
- Gilavand
- Heydarabad
- Karimabad
- Sarab-e Suri
- Sardarabad
- Seyfabad
