= Deh-e Mohsen, Sistan and Baluchestan =

Deh-e Mohsen ده محسن
- Village
- Location within Iran
- Coordinates: 31°12′32″N 61°45′35″E
- Country: Iran
- Province: Sistan and Baluchestan
- County: Hirmand
- Bakhsh: Qorqori
- Rural District: Qorqori

Population (2006)
  - Total: 124
- Time zone: UTC+3:30 (IRST)
  - Summer (DST): UTC+4:30 (IRDT)

Deh-e Mohsen (Persian: ده محسن, also Romanized as Deh-e Moḩsen) is a village in Qorqori Rural District, Qorqori District, Hirmand County, Sistan and Baluchestan Province, Iran. At the 2006 census, its population was 124, in 24 families.
