= Bardabad =

Bardabad برداباد
- Village
- Location within Iran
- Coordinates: 30°07′49″N 52°04′20″E
- Country: Iran
- Province: Fars
- County: Sepidan
- Bakhsh: Hamaijan
- Rural District: Hamaijan

Population (2006)
  - Total: 119
- Time zone: UTC+3:30 (IRST)
  - Summer (DST): UTC+4:30 (IRDT)

Bardabad (Persian: برداباد, also Romanized as Bardābād; also known as Badrābād) is a village in Hamaijan Rural District, Hamaijan District, Sepidan County, Fars province, Iran. At the 2006 census, its population was 119, in 27 families.
