= Da-rae =

- Hangul: 다래
- RR: Darae
- MR: Tarae
- IPA: [taɾɛ]

Da-rae, also spelled Da-lae, is a Korean given name. The word itself is a native Korean word meaning "gooseberry" and does not have corresponding hanja. However, since Korean given names can be created arbitrarily, it may also be a name with hanja.

== People ==
People with this name include:

- Jeong Da-rae (born 1991), South Korean former swimmer
- Kim Da-rae (born 1987), South Korean field hockey player

== Fictional characters ==
Fictional characters with this name include:

- Da-rae, in the 2014 South Korean television series Dr. Frost
- Yoon Da-rae, in the 2016 South Korean television drama Pinocchio's Nose

== See also ==
- List of Korean given names
