= Actinidia melanandra =

Scientific classification
- Kingdom: Plantae
- Clade: Tracheophytes
- Clade: Angiosperms
- Clade: Eudicots
- Clade: Asterids
- Order: Ericales
- Family: Actinidiaceae
- Genus: Actinidia
- Species: A. melanandra

Binomial name
- Actinidia melanandra Franch.

Species of vine

Actinidia melanandra, known as purple kiwi or red kiwi is a fruiting plant in the genus Actinidia, which contains three commercially grown species of kiwifruit. The plant is native to parts of Hubei, Sichuan, and Yunnan provinces of China. The fruit has a fuzzy purple skin with reddish flesh. Although the fruit is edible, is not commercially cultivated, however it is occasionally sold as a landscape plant under the erroneous name Actinidia melandra.
