= Badrabad, Baft =

Badrabad بدراباد
- Village
- Location within Iran
- Coordinates: 28°59′14″N 56°37′54″E
- Country: Iran
- Province: Kerman
- County: Baft
- Bakhsh: Central
- Rural District: Dashtab

Population (2006)
  - Total: 100
- Time zone: UTC+3:30 (IRST)
  - Summer (DST): UTC+4:30 (IRDT)

Badrabad (Persian: بدراباد, also Romanized as Badrābād) is a village in Dashtab Rural District, in the Central District of Baft County, Kerman Province, Iran. At the 2006 census, its population was 100, in 22 families.
