= Badrabad, West Azerbaijan =

Badrabad بدراباد
- Village
- Location within Iran
- Coordinates: 36°29′28″N 45°20′48″E
- Country: Iran
- Province: West Azerbaijan
- County: Piranshahr
- Bakhsh: Central
- Rural District: Mangur-e Gharbi

Population (2006)
  - Total: 71
- Time zone: UTC+3:30 (IRST)
  - Summer (DST): UTC+4:30 (IRDT)

Badrabad (Persian: بدراباد, also Romanized as Badrābād) is a village in Mangur-e Gharbi Rural District, in the Central District of Piranshahr County, West Azerbaijan Province, Iran. At the 2006 census, its population was 71, in 10 families.
