= Imanabad-e Sofla =

Imanabad-e Sofla ايمان آباد سفلي
- Village
- Country: Iran
- Province: Lorestan
- County: Delfan
- Bakhsh: Central
- Rural District: Nurali

Population (2006)
  - Total: 27
- Time zone: UTC+3:30 (IRST)
  - Summer (DST): UTC+4:30 (IRDT)

Imanabad-e Sofla (Persian: ايمان آباد سفلي, also Romanized as Īmānābād-e Soflá) is a village in Iran, located in Nurali Rural District, in the Central District of Delfan County, Lorestan Province. At the 2006 census, its population was 27, in 8 families.
