= Dinarvand (tribe) =

Lur tribe from Iran

The Dinarvand (Luri and Persian: دیناروند) are a Lur tribe living mainly in southwestern Iran. They traditionally speak a dialect of Northern Luri and follow Shia Islam.

== History ==
The Dinarvand tribe were believed to have originated from the Kargah valley to the southwest of Khorramabad in Lorestan province, having migrated to Posht-e-Kuh (Ilam province) alongside the Vali dynasty after the Qajar government seized Khorramabad. Amanollahi wrote that the Dinarvand tribe of Lorestan province were part of the Agha-Rezayi clan of the Judaki tribe. According to C. J. Edmonds, the speech of the Dinarvand tribe resembled the Luri of Bala Gariva.

They were estimated at 200 families during the Qajar period, and 100 families during the Pahlavi period. The Dinarvand tribe traditionally lived in the districts of Khorramabad, Dehloran, Andimeshk, Dezful, and Shoush. In Abbasabad (7 miles south of Dezful) the Dinarvand lived alongside the Sagvand Lurs and some Arabs, while in the village of Karim Khan (12 miles southwest of Dezful) the Dinarvand formed the majority, with a minority of Sagvand Lurs, Kurds, and Arabs.
