= Bahadorabad, Fars =

Bahadorabad بهادراباد
- Village
- Location within Iran
- Coordinates: 28°36′42″N 55°12′52″E
- Country: Iran
- Province: Fars
- County: Darab
- Bakhsh: Rostaq
- Rural District: Kuhestan

Population (2006)
  - Total: 33
- Time zone: UTC+3:30 (IRST)
  - Summer (DST): UTC+4:30 (IRDT)

Bahadorabad (Persian: بهادراباد, also Romanized as Bahādorābād; also known as Bādarābād) is a village in Kuhestan Rural District, Rostaq District, Darab County, Fars province, Iran. At the 2006 census, its population was 33, in 12 families.
