= Koregah-e Sharqi Rural District =

Rural district in Lorestan province, Iran

Koregah-e Sharqi Rural District Persian: دهستان كرگاه شرقي
- Rural District
- Location within Iran
- Coordinates: 33°21′29″N 48°24′07″E
- Country: Iran
- Province: Lorestan
- County: Khorramabad
- District: Central
- Established: 1990
- Capital: Darai

Population (2016)
  - Total: 11,759
- Time zone: UTC+3:30 (IRST)

Koregah-e Sharqi Rural District (Persian: دهستان كرگاه شرقي) is in the Central District of Khorramabad County, Lorestan province, Iran. Its capital is the village of Darai. The previous capital of the rural district was the village of Dinarvand-e Bala.

== Demographics ==
=== Population ===
At the time of the 2006 National Census, the rural district's population was 11,294 in 2,217 households. There were 12,456 inhabitants in 2,643 households at the following census of 2011. The 2016 census measured the population of the rural district as 11,759 in 2,731 households. The most populous of its 34 villages was Darai, with 3,151 people.

=== Other villages in the rural district ===
- Belilvand
- Deh-e Baqer
- Dinarvand-e Pain
- Peleh-ye Baba Hoseyn
- Sali-ye Bozorg
- Sorkheh Deh-e Sofla
