= Koregah-e Gharbi Rural District =

Rural district in Lorestan province, Iran

Koregah-e Gharbi Rural District Persian: دهستان كرگاه غربي
- Rural District
- Location within Iran
- Coordinates: 33°25′N 48°14′E
- Country: Iran
- Province: Lorestan
- County: Khorramabad
- District: Central
- Established: 1987
- Capital: Badrabad-e Sofla

Population (2016)
  - Total: 42,884
- Time zone: UTC+3:30 (IRST)

Koregah-e Gharbi Rural District (Persian: دهستان كرگاه غربي) (Note: Formerly Koregah Rural District (دهستان كرگاه)) is in the Central District of Khorramabad County, Lorestan province, Iran. Its capital is the village of Badrabad-e Sofla.

== Demographics ==
=== Population ===
At the time of the 2006 National Census, the rural district's population was 45,409 in 9,297 households. There were 50,971 inhabitants in 12,540 households at the following census of 2011. The 2016 census measured the population of the rural district as 42,884 in 11,438 households. The most populous of its 60 villages was Deh-e Mohsen, with 5,216 people.

=== Other villages in the rural district ===
- Araban
- Bahrami
- Chogha Khandaq
- Gilvaran-e Bala
- Gilvaran-e Pain
- Hajj Khadijeh
- Kaveh Kali
- Mian Golal
- Poshteh Jazayeri
- Sarab-e Changai
- Sarab-e Yas
- Shahrak-e Baba Abbas
- Soheyl Beygi
- Taluri-ye Olya
- Taluri-ye Sofla
- Tir Bazar
