= Central District (Khorramabad County) =

District in Lorestan province, Iran

Central District (Khorramabad County) Persian: بخش مرکزی شهرستان خرم‌آباد
- District
- Location within Iran
- Coordinates: 33°30′N 48°23′E
- Country: Iran
- Province: Lorestan
- County: Khorramabad
- Capital: Khorramabad

Population (2016)
  - Total: 463,599
- Time zone: UTC+3:30 (IRST)

The Central District of Khorramabad County (Persian: بخش مرکزی شهرستان خرم‌آباد) is in Lorestan province, Iran. Its capital is the city of Khorramabad.

== Demographics ==
=== Population ===
At the time of the 2006 National Census, the district's population was 417,556 in 94,201 households. The following census in 2011 counted 445,627 people in 118,398 households. The 2016 census measured the population of the district as 463,599 inhabitants in 133,110 households.

=== Administrative divisions ===
Central District (Khorramabad County) Population
Administrative Divisions	2006	2011	2016
Azna RD	6,214	6,190	5,859
Dehpir-e Jonubi RD (Note: Formerly Dehpir Rural District)	7,479	9,659	10,258
Dehpir-e Shomali RD	6,332	6,108	6,082
Kakasharaf RD	4,091	3,627	2,742
Koregah-e Gharbi RD (Note: Formerly Koregah Rural District)	45,409	50,971	42,884
Koregah-e Sharqi RD	11,294	12,456	11,759
Robat RD	8,193	8,400	10,599
Khorramabad (city)	328,544	348,216	373,416
Total	417,556	445,627	463,599
RD = Rural District
