= Chennault (disambiguation) =

Chennault refers to Claire Lee Chennault, an American military aviator

Chennault may also refer to:

- Anna Chennault, widow of Claire Lee Chennault
- Chennault International Airport, near Lake Charles, Louisiana, United States, named for Claire Lee Chennault
- Chennault, Georgia, an unincorporated community in the United States

== See also ==
- Chenault, a surname
- Chennault House (disambiguation)
