= Chenault =

Chenault is a surname. Notable people with the surname include:

- Chelsea Chenault (born 1994), competitive swimmer
- Cynthia Chenault (born 1937), actress (screen name Cindy Robbins) and television writer
- Gene Chenault (1919–2010), co-founder of Drake-Chenault radio syndication company
- Kenneth Chenault (born 1951), chairman of American Express
- Lawrence Chenault (1877–1943), silent film actor
- Léon Chenault (1853–1930), botanist
- Marcus Wayne Chenault (1951–1995), convicted killer of Alberta King
- Mike Chenault (born 1957), Speaker of the Alaska House of Representatives
- Renee Chenault-Fattah (born 1957), television news anchor
- Venida Chenault, American government official and academic administrator

== See also ==
- Chennault (disambiguation)
