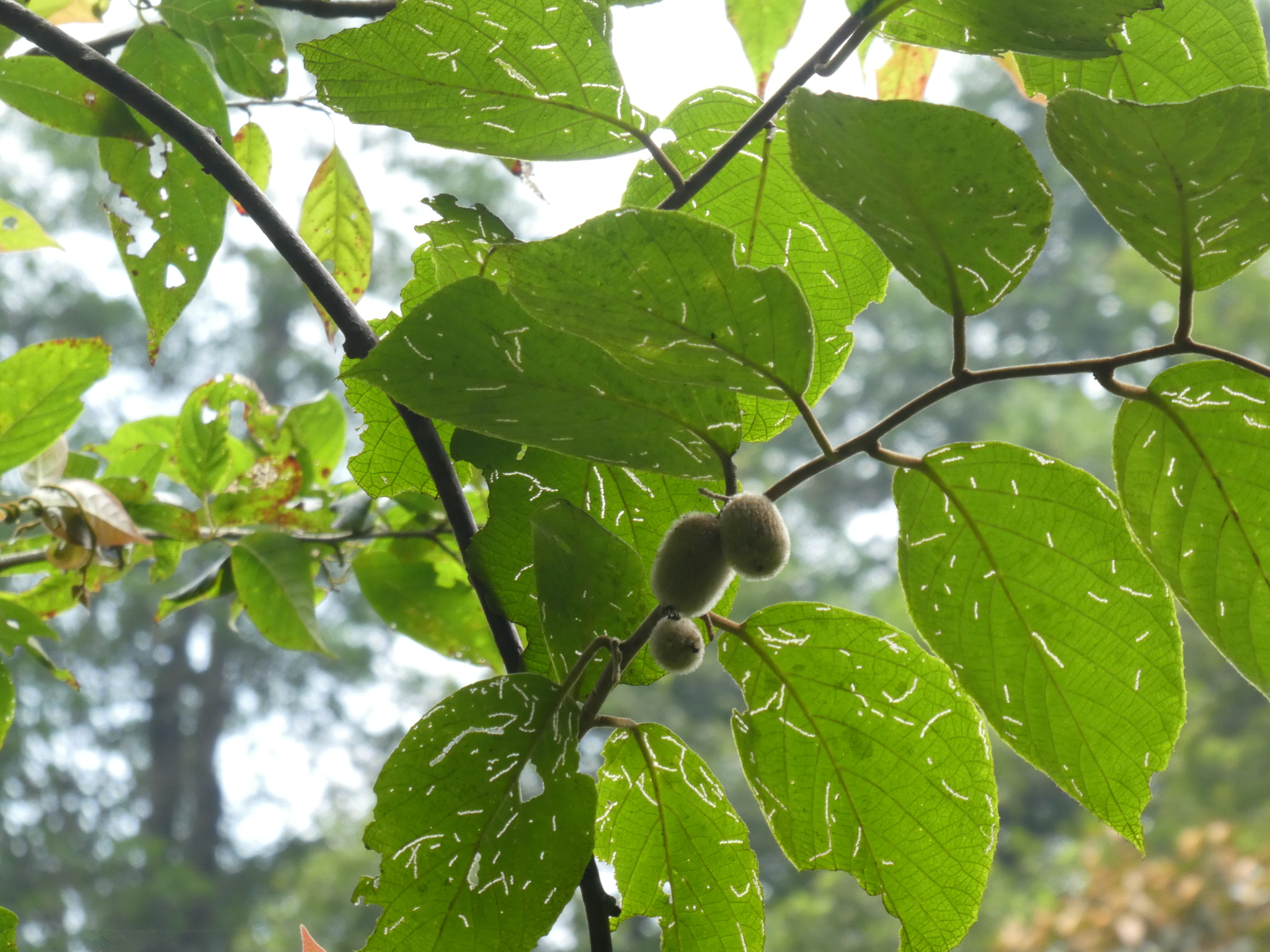
- Actinidia eriantha seen at Nanling National Forest Park, Guangdong, China

Scientific classification
- Kingdom: Plantae
- Clade: Tracheophytes
- Clade: Angiosperms
- Clade: Eudicots
- Clade: Asterids
- Order: Ericales
- Family: Actinidiaceae
- Genus: Actinidia
- Species: A. eriantha

Binomial name
- Actinidia eriantha Benth.

Synonyms
- List: Actinidia davidii Franch.; Actinidia eriantha f. alba C.F.Gan; Actinidia eriantha var. brunnea C.F.Liang; Actinidia eriantha var. calvescens C.F.Liang; Actinidia fulvicoma var. lanata (Hemsl.) C.F.Liang; Actinidia lanata Hemsl.

= Actinidia eriantha =

Species of plant

Actinidia eriantha is a species of flowering plant in the family Actinidiaceae, native to southern China. A large climbing shrub, it is found in low mountain forests and grassy thickets at elevations from 200 to 1,000 m (700 to 3,300 ft). It fruits in November, which has precluded its development as a commercial crop.

Actinidia eriantha is a species of flowering plant in the Chinese gooseberry family Actinidiaceae, native to southern China. It is one of the wild kiwifruit species in the genus Actinidia.

== Genomics ==
A chromosome-level haplotype-resolved genome assembly of a wild kiwifruit (Actinidia eriantha) individual was published in 2026. The assembled genome sizes were approximately 663.8 Mb and 633.1 Mb for the two haplotypes, with 29 pseudochromosomes. The assembly had a BUSCO completeness score of 99.5%, and 39,983 and 40,099 high-confidence protein-coding genes were predicted for the two haplotypes, respectively.

== Gallery ==
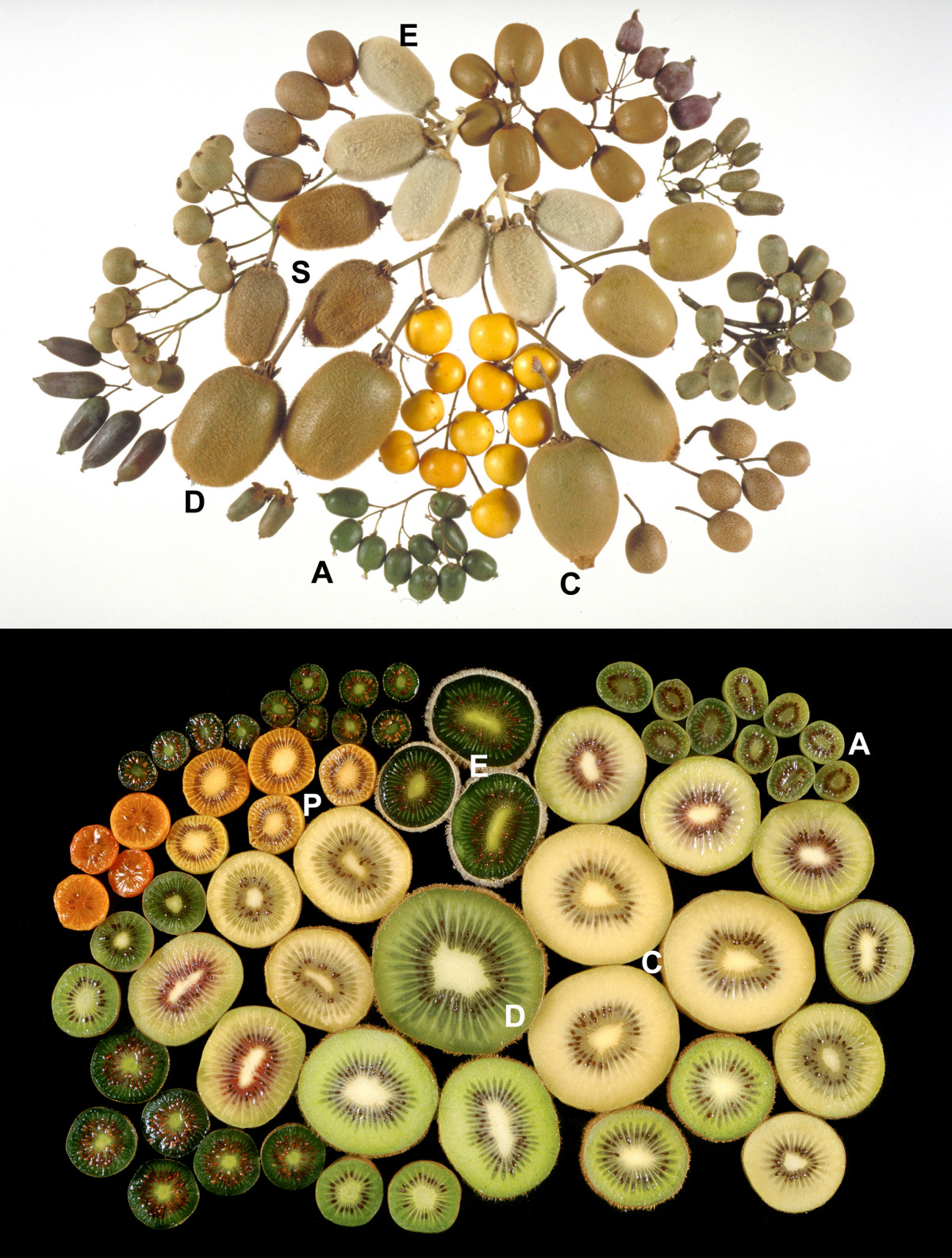
Fruits of different species of Actinidia: A = A. arguta, C = A. chinensis var. chinensis, D = A. chinensis var. deliciosa, E = A. eriantha, I = A. indochinensis, P = A. polygama, S = A. chinensis var. setosa.

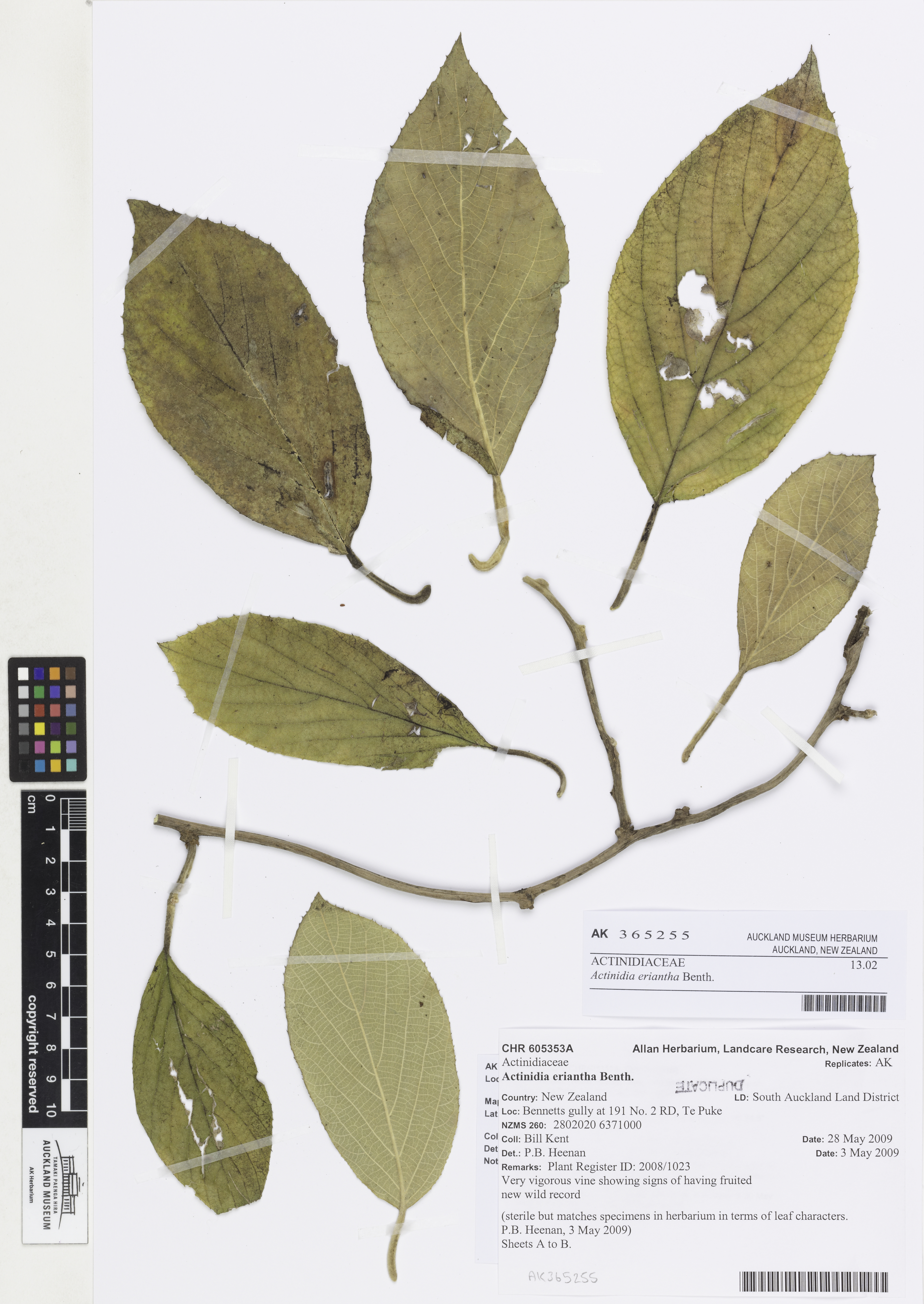
Herbarium specimen of Actinidia eriantha, growing wild near Te Puke, Bay of Plenty, New Zealand
