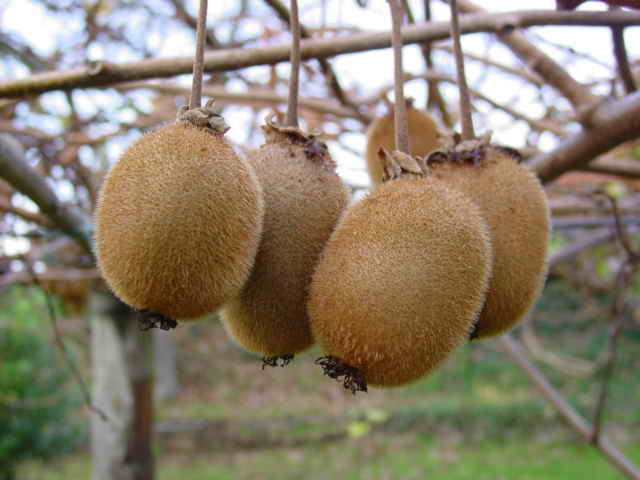
- Kiwifruit

Scientific classification
- Kingdom: Plantae
- Clade: Tracheophytes
- Clade: Angiosperms
- Clade: Eudicots
- Clade: Asterids
- Order: Ericales
- Family: Actinidiaceae
- Genus: Actinidia
- Species: A. chinensis
- Variety: A. c. var. deliciosa

Trinomial name
- Actinidia chinensis var. deliciosa (A.Chev.) A.Chev.

Synonyms
- Synonymy: Actinidia chinensis f. chlorocarpa C.F.Liang; Actinidia chinensis f. longipila C.F.Liang & R.Z.Wang; Actinidia chinensis var. deliciosa (A.Chev.) A.Chev.; Actinidia chinensis var. hispida C.F. Liang f. longipila C.F. Liang & R.Z. Wang ex C.F.; Actinidia deliciosa (A.Chev.) C.F.Liang & A.R.Ferguson; Actinidia deliciosa var. chlorocarpa (C. F. Liang) C. F. Liang & A. R. Ferguson; Actinidia deliciosa var. coloris T.H.Lin & X.Y.Xiong; Actinidia deliciosa var. longipila (C. F. Liang & R. Z. Wang) C. F. Liang & A. R. Ferguson; Actinidia latifolia var. deliciosa A.Chev.

= Actinidia chinensis var. deliciosa =

Species of plant

Actinidia chinensis var. deliciosa, also known as Actinidia deliciosa, green kiwifruit or the fuzzy kiwifruit, is a fruiting vine native to central Southern China, growing naturally at altitudes between 800 and 1,400 metres (2,600 and 4,600 ft). The vine was the first commercially available cultivated variety of kiwifruit, and is the source of many of the green varieties of kiwifruit, including the most popular cultivar globally, Hayward, as well as the Chinese cultivars Qinmei, Guichang and Miliang No. 1.

== Taxonomy ==
The taxon was first formally described in 1940 by Auguste Chevalier, under the name Actinidia latifolia var. deliciosa. Chevalier revised the name the following year to Actinidia chinensis var. deliciosa. Chevalier based the description on type specimens growing at the National Museum of Natural History, France of unknown providence, which Chevalier suggested may have originated from French nurseryman Léon Chenault. Chevalier noted the main differences between Actinidia chinensis var. deliciosa and Actinidia chinensis were differences in leaves and tips of the branches.

In 1975, Chinese botanist Chou Fen Liang revised the taxonomy of Actinidia chinensis, unbeknownst of Chevalier's work, describing the plant as Actinidia chinensis var. hispida. Recognising the previous descriptions by Chevalier, and believing that the plant was sufficiently distinct from other Actinidia, the binomial name was revised in 1984 by Chou Fen Liang and Ross Ferguson, becoming Actinidia deliciosa. Liang and Ferguson justified raising the taxon to species level based on morphological differences in the plant, including flowers and fruit, and chromosome numbers. In 2007, Actinidia deliciosa was revised again returning the preferred binomial nomenclature to Actinidia chinensis var. deliciosa, to reflect the growing evidence that Actinidia chinensis var. deliciosa and Actinidia chinensis var. chinensis were part of a species complex. This change was reflected in the 2007 edition of the Flora of China, used as the current authority by sources including Plants of the World Online.

Phylogenetic analysis has shown that the taxon is more closely related to the Taiwanese kiwifruit, Actinidia chinensis var. setosa, than to Actinidia chinensis var. chinensis.

Numerous botanical varieties, including Actinidia deliciosa var. chlorocarpa, Actinidia deliciosa var. longipila and Actinidia deliciosa var. coloris have been proposed, However, this subdivision is generally rejected, relegated to forms and treated as synonyms of Actinidia chinensis var. deliciosa. Actinidia chinensis var. jinggangshanensis was a proposed name for certain plants which were an intermediate form between Actinidia chinensis var. chinensis and Actinidia chinensis var. deliciosa, which has since been synonymised with Actinidia chinensis var. chinensis.

This taxon is the origin of the first commercial kiwifruit cultivars, giving rise to the early 20th century green kiwifruit varieties cultivated in New Zealand, including Hayward and Bruno.

== Description and ecology ==
Actinidia chinensis var. deliciosa is a vigorous, woody, twining vine or climbing shrub reaching 9 metres (30 ft).

The black-lyre leafroller moth ("Cnephasia" jactatana) is one of the few commercially significant pests of this plant.

Fungal pathogen Fusarium acuminatum has been found to be a ripe rot pathogen of Actinidia chinensis var. deliciosa in New Zealand.

=== Leaves ===
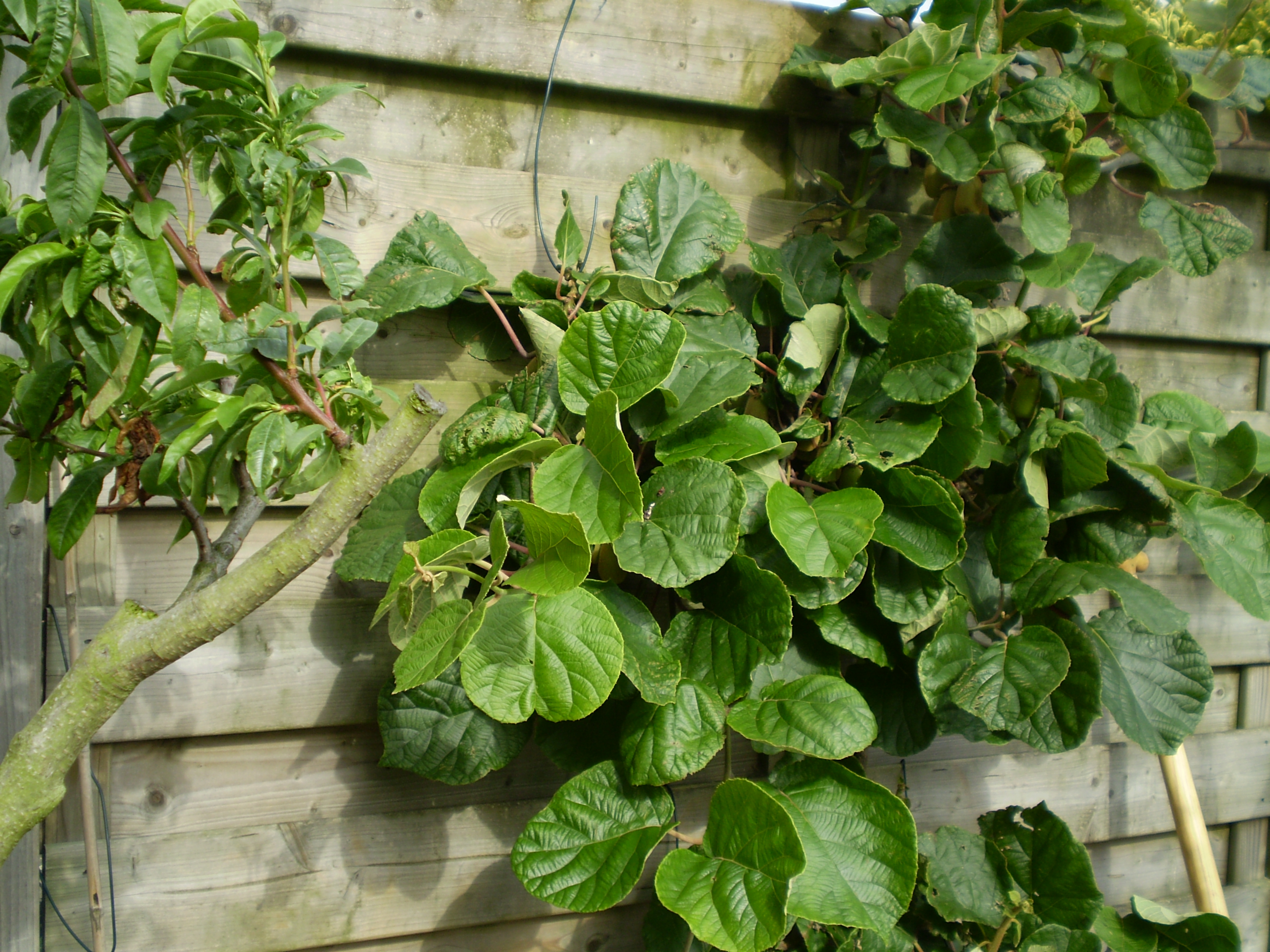
Foliage

Its leaves are alternate, long-petioled, deciduous, oval to nearly circular, cordate at the base, and 7.5–12.5 cm (3–5 in) long. Young leaves are coated with red hairs; mature leaves are dark-green and hairless on the upper surface, and downy-white with prominent, light-colored veins beneath.

=== Flowers ===
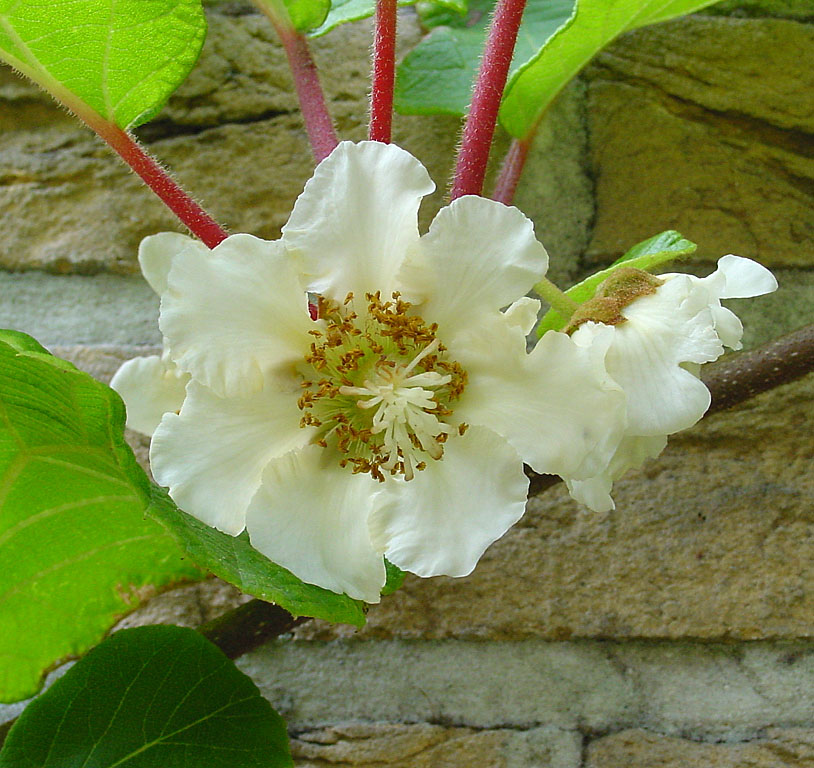
Flower

The flowers are fragrant, dioecious or unisexual, borne singly or in threes in the leaf axils, are five- to six-petalled, white at first, changing to buff-yellow, 2.5–5 cm (1–2 in) broad, and both sexes have central tufts of many stamens, though those of the female flowers with no viable pollen. The flowers also lack nectar. Male and female flowers appear on different plants (dioecious), and both sexes have to be planted nearby for fruit set. Commercial orchards often use bees, although the more labor-intensive hand pollination is sometimes employed. Male flowers are gathered and processed to extract their pollen. This is then sprayed back onto the female flowers.

=== Fruits ===
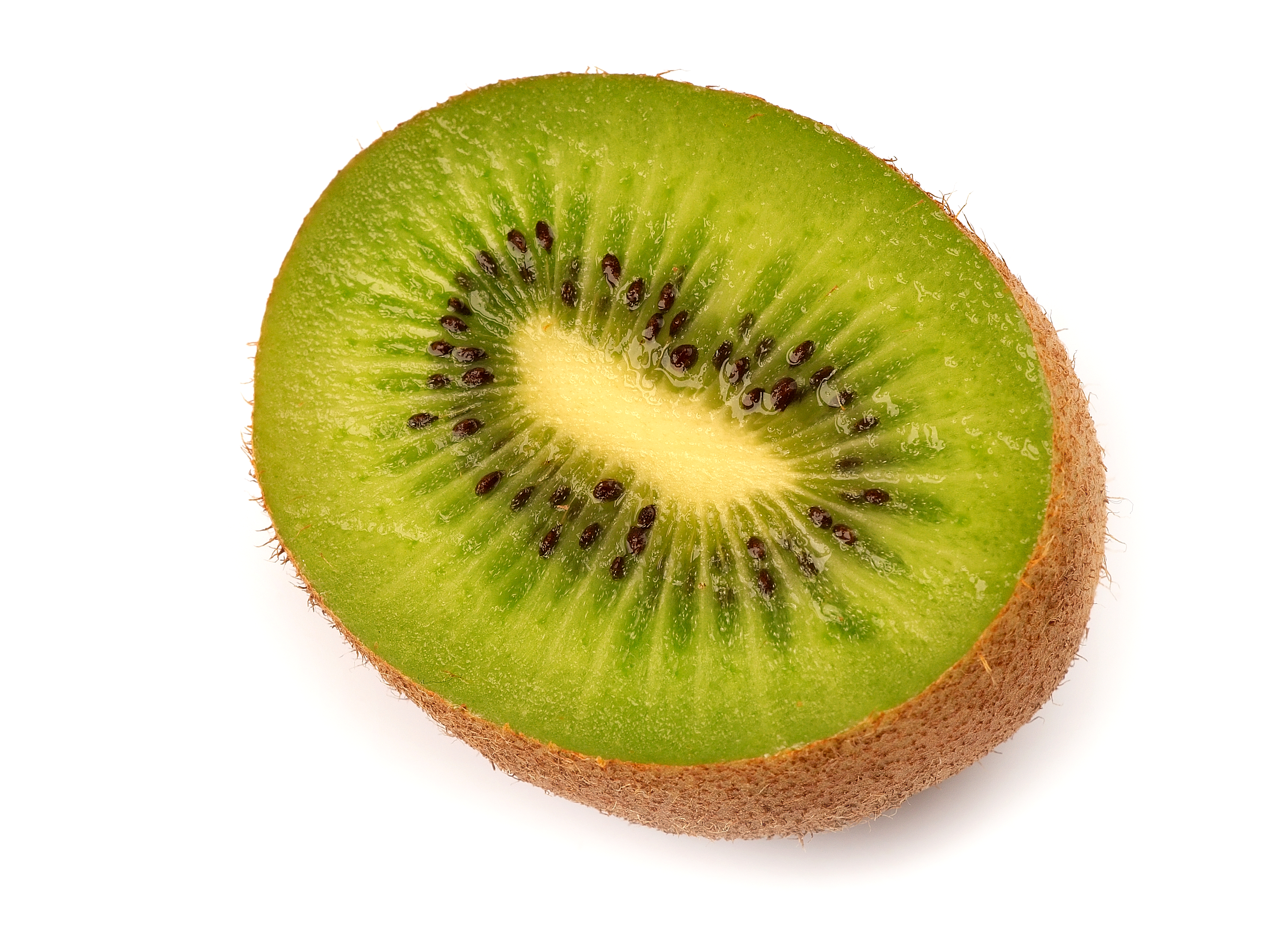
A kiwifruit cut in cross-section

The oblong fruits are up to 6.25 cm (2.5 in) long. The russet-brown skin of the fruits is densely covered with short, stiff, brown hairs. The flesh is firm until fully ripened; it is glistening, juicy and luscious. The color of the flesh is bright green, or sometimes yellow, brownish, or off-white, except for the white, succulent center from which radiates many fine, pale lines. The flavor is subacid to quite acid; the flavor is suggested to be similar to that of the gooseberry or strawberry.

== Habitat ==
The taxon is native to central-southern China, found growing in mountain forests between 800–1,400 m (2,600–4,600 ft) above sea-level. The native range includes Chongqing, Gansu, Guangxi, Guizhou, Henan, Hubei, Hunan, Jiangxi, Shaanxi, Sichuan and Yunnan. Commercial cultivars first developed in New Zealand in the early 20th century from seeds sourced from China, and the plant is widely cultivated globally.

Wild Actinidia chinensis var. deliciosa tends to grow in inland and colder regions of southwestern China, while Actinidia chinensis var. chinensis tends to grow in south-eastern China in warmer, coastal provinces. The two varieties have overlapping ranges in southeastern Shaanxi, southwestern Henan, western Hubai and Hunan, where intermediate forms between the two varieties can be found.

== History ==
Traditional Chinese names for the fruit include míhóutáo (Chinese: 獼猴桃; trans. "macaque peach"), húlítáo (Chinese: 狐狸桃; trans. "fox peach"), ténglí (Chinese: 藤梨; trans. "vine pear") and yángtáo (Chinese: 羊桃; trans. "sheep peach"), however no traditional distinction existed between Actinidia chinensis var. chinensis and Actinidia chinensis var. deliciosa, with míhóutáo and yángtáo being names used to refer to both varieties. The first known references to Actinidia plants in China date to the Tang dynasty in the 800s, when sporadic attempts were made to cultivate the fruit. This includes a Tang Dynasty poem written by Cen Shen, set in Shaanxi, which describes a plant growing above a well; suggesting that the plant may have been cultivated in gardens during this period. In the Běncǎo Yǎnyì (Chinese: 本草衍義), a 12th century medicinal compendium by Kou Zongshi, describes the plant as growing along pathways deep in the mountains of China, and notes that monkeys eat the fruit. Míhóutáo, including Actinidia chinensis var. deliciosa, were traditionally seen as a wild plant, and were often collected and sold at markets in central Chinese provinces.

In 1847, specimens of the plant were collected by the agent for the Royal Horticultural Society, London. Cultivation spread from China in the early 20th century when seeds were introduced to New Zealand by Mary Isabel Fraser, the principal of Whanganui Girls' College, who had been visiting mission schools in China. The seeds were planted in 1906 by a Wanganui nurseryman, Alexander Allison, with the vines first fruiting in 1910. People who tasted the fruit thought it had a gooseberry flavor, so began to call it the Chinese gooseberry, but being from the genus Actinidia, it is not related to the gooseberry family, Grossulariaceae.

Over time, numerous cultivars were developed by different growers, all originating from the same plant material that was brought to New Zealand by Fraser. In the early 1950s, Harold Mouat of the Fruit Research Division of the Department of Scientific and Industrial Research, classified and standardised many of the known important varieties, which included Abbott, Allison, Bruno, Gracie, Hayward, Montgomery and Elmwood. The familiar cultivar Actinidia chinensis var. deliciosa 'Hayward' was developed by Hayward Wright in Avondale, New Zealand, around 1924.

The first commercial orchards in New Zealand were established by Fred J. Walker near Whanganui in the early 1930s. From 1953, the fruit began to be exported to Britain and Australia, primarily Abbott cultivar and a minority of Bruno. In 1959, Turners and Growers renamed the fruit kiwifruit for the export market, and the global market for kiwifruit greatly grew in the 1960s and 1970s. Hayward was first exported in 1959 to the United States, and by the late 1960s, Hayward had become the dominant cultivar of kiwifruit exported from New Zealand, and by 1975 the sole export, until the late 1990s.

In 1957, the China National Botanical Garden sourced wild Actinidia chinensis var. deliciosa seeds from the Qinling mountains of Shaanxi, growing the first specimens in a botanical institute in China. By 1974, Chinese horticulturists began surveying wild germplasm of Actinidia species growing in mountainous central China, looking to develop cultivars which could compete with the popularity of New Zealand kiwifruit cultivars. While trial cultivars which were investigated and developed from the wild plants primarily focused on Actinidia chinensis var. deliciosa, these surveys of wild plants revealed the potential for sweet, yellow-fleshed Actinidia chinensis var. chinensis fruit to be developed as kiwifruit cultivars. These wild plant surveys led to the developments of many Chinese cultivars of Actinidia chinensis var. deliciosa, including Qinmei, Guichang and Miliang No. 1. The cultivars are a rare example of crop development, where plants only a few generations removed from wild plants became commercial crops.

By the 1970s, interest in kiwifruit production led to Hayward cultivar Actinidia chinensis var. deliciosa orchards to be planted across the world. In Italy between 600–800 ha (1,500–2,000 acres) of kiwifruit orchards were in operation, which by 1988 had grown to just under 10,000 ha (25,000 acres). In 2006 Italy was the leading producer of kiwifruit in the world, followed by New Zealand, Chile, France, Greece, Japan, and the United States. In 2016, global production of kiwifruit was 4.3 million metric tons (4.7 million short tons), led by China with 56% of the world total—followed by Italy and New Zealand being the other major producers. In China, it is grown mainly in the mountainous area upstream of the Yangtze River. It is also grown in other Chinese regions, including Sichuan.

By the late 1990s, New Zealand kiwifruit growers and kiwifruit exporters Zespri began to market a gold kiwifruit cultivar grown from Actinidia chinensis var. chinensis, as opposed to Actinidia chinensis var. deliciosa. By 2010, Actinidia chinensis sales make up a third of total kiwifruit sales in the New Zealand industry, reducing the dominance of Actinidia chinensis var. deliciosa. Similarly, gold and red varieties of Actinidia chinensis in China began to become more commercially available in the 1990s, and by 2002 50% of the total kiwifruit vines were of Actinidia chinensis varieties.

In 2010 and 2011, kiwifruit vines worldwide, in Italy, France, and New Zealand, suffered devastating attacks by a bacterial disease caused by Pseudomonas syringae pv. actinidiae, with some of the New Zealand attacks by the virulent strain PSA-V. The disease was noticed in Japan in the 1980s, and subsequently in northern Italy (1992) and South Korea.

== Cultivars ==
Common name	Image	Origin	First developed and introduced	Notes
Abbott		New Zealand	Early 20th century	Propagated by Green's Nursery, Campbell Road, Auckland, based on plants received by Hayward Wright's Avondale nursery.
Allison		New Zealand	Early 20th century	Raised by Bruno Just, who named the variety after Alexander Allison. The main export variety of kiwifruit in the 1950s.
Bruno		New Zealand	1928	Named after Bruno Just, likely cultivated by Just.
Chuanmi-1		China	1982	Selected in by Cangxi Agricultural Bureau from plants in Cangxi County, Sichuan. The fruit are ellipsoids and are easy to peel.
Elmwood		New Zealand	Early 20th century	
Gracie		New Zealand	1920s	Selected for by Hayward Wright at his Avondale nursery
Guichang		China	1970s	
Hayward		New Zealand	1924	Also marketed as Zespri Green. Selected for by Hayward Wright at his Avondale nursery, first sold in New Zealand markets in the 1930s, after E. D. Forester established an orchard in Huapai, originally sold under the name Wright's Large Oval.
Jinkui		China	1982	Also known as Jinshui 11-16-11. Selected in by Hubei Provincial Fruit and Tea Institute from open-pollination of wild Zhuxi-2 plants.
Kiwi de l'Adour		France	1965	Exclusively grown in the Adour basin of France
Miliang 1		China	1983	Selected by the Department of Biology, Jishou University from wild plants in Fenghuang County, Hunan. The fruit are long and cylindrical, and has a yellow-green colour.
Monty		New Zealand	Early 20th century	Also known as Montgomery. Cultivated by Bruno Just and named after C. Montgomery, the owner of the vine.
Qinmei		China	1979	Also known as Zhouzhi 111. Selected by Shaanxi Provincial Fruit Research Institute and the Zhouzhi Mihoutao Research Station from wild plants in Zhouzhi County, Shaanxi. The plants have a distinctive "beak" at the distal end.
Saanichton 12		Vancouver Island, British Columbia, Canada	1970s	
Yate		China	1983	Also known as Zhouzhi-1. Selected by the Shaanxi Fruit Research Institute from wild plants in the Qinling Mountains, Shaanxi.

== See also ==
- Kiwifruit
- Kiwifruit industry in New Zealand
- Actinidia arguta, the hardy kiwi
