= Chenault House =

Chenault House may refer to:

in the United States (by state then town)

- Chenault House (Richmond, Kentucky), listed on the National Register of Historic Places (NRHP) in Madison County
- Chenault House (Star Mills, Kentucky), listed on the NRHP in Hardin County,
- Brown-Chenault House, Castalian Springs, Tennessee, listed on the NRHP in Sumner County

== See also ==
- Chennault House (disambiguation)
