= Saturation pollination =

Pollination technique

Saturation pollination is a pollination technique for agricultural crops in areas dominated by non-crop plant species that are preferred by pollinators. The technique involves keeping a larger number of bee colonies than normally maintained for honey production so as to exhaust the preferred plants and ensure visitation of the crop plants by the bees. The technique is applied in areas that are normally avoided by beekeepers because of poor honey yields.

Saturation pollination is especially important for those with special pollination problems, such as crops with flowers that are unattractive to Western honey bees (kiwifruit, for example), that have nectar that is low in sugars, or crops that have been moved from their native areas without the corresponding movement of their normal pollinators. The keel of alfalfa flowers knocks young honey bees on the head when they attempt to take the nectar and the bees soon learn to come in from the side to avoid getting hit with the keel's pollen bearing structure while still getting the nectar. Thus only young, inexperienced bees are doused with pollen and able to pollinate alfalfa. Saturation pollination is becoming increasingly required for many crops due to decline of wild pollinators and monocultured crops.

== History of the technique ==
The concept was developed by commercial California beekeeper Harry J. Whitcombe and University of California entomologist George H. Vansell in conjunction with alfalfa seed production.

Though fruit growers and beekeepers were well acquainted with the vital role of Western honey bees in pollinating fruit blossoms, the role of these bees in alfalfa seed production was poorly understood. In the 1920s California beekeepers began migrating into Utah during the alfalfa bloom; at that time Utah was the largest alfalfa seed producing state in the US. When alfalfa first comes into bloom the flowers are bluish-purple and the fields have a bright cast. As the blossoms are pollinated the flowers fade and take on a grayish cast, making the field appear dull colored. Utah farmers were convinced that the bees were somehow damaging the blossoms, and persuaded the state legislature in 1930 to enact an embargo against bees entering the state from other states. Alfalfa seed yields from the fields declined so precipitously that the farmers were going bankrupt. The error was realized and the embargo rescinded in 1934; however Utah had forever lost its pre-eminent position as an alfalfa seed growing state, and California took the lead. After World War II, demand for alfalfa seed reached an all-time high. Normally alfalfa is planted in rotation with other crops, because, as a legume, it replenishes nitrogen in the soil. However, wartime needs had caused many alfalfa fields to be converted to vegetables and other crops thought to be more necessary to the war effort. Now, the farmers were trying to repair the damage done to soils by replanting alfalfa. While the demand was the highest in history, seed production was steadily declining. Increasing pesticide use and the increased utilization of fallow land and hedgerows drove depleting wild pollinators to near the vanishing point. California beekeepers produced a high quality honey from alfalfa, and were willing to move bees to the alfalfa seed fields at a rate of one and a half hives per acre. Experience had shown this the maximum rate at which bees could be stocked without damaging the honey yield per hive. Vansell and Whitcombe had become convinced by their observations that the optimum rate for honey production for beekeepers was not sufficient for optimum pollination and seed production. Whitcombe notes that he always observed the heaviest seed set in the plants that were nearest the stands of bees.

Vansell was finally able to convince Luther G Jones, the alfalfa seed specialist at the agricultural college at Davis, that further experiments in this area would be profitable. The plan was to stock some test fields at four to six hives per acre and see if the yield responded. It was called saturation pollination. But beekeepers were not willing to stock hives at a more concentrated rate, because they would lose money. At the same time, even though fruit growers had long been accustomed to paying pollination fees, no alfalfa seed grower was willing to pay for pollination service.

In 1948 the three were able to find a grower who was willing to risk a contingent deal. Stan Good, of Woodland, California, was a progressive farmer who was willing to experiment. But he would not risk any money. The deal was that Good would raise 150 acres (0.61 km^{2}) of alfalfa for seed production, using the best cultivation techniques known, and Whitcombe would supply the bees at the rate of five hives per acre, again using the best management practices. For every pound of alfalfa seed produced above the rate of 400 pounds per acre (which was well above the area's normal average), Whitcombe would receive one cent per hive. And for all seed produced above 750 pounds per acre, one third of the seed would belong to the beekeeper.

The result was that the plants set so heavy a seed crop that they could not support the seed head. True to his word, Good began irrigating, a practice not normally done, so that the plants would continue to grow and strengthen to support the seed heads. The plants began to grow again and put out more bloom, which promptly set more seed. At harvest time, the results of the experiment were so phenomenal that it almost ruined the experiment. The crop yield was so heavy that the harvesting equipment choked up and broke down. It had to be reworked by the agricultural mechanics at Davis to give heavier bearings and increased capacity. With seasonal rains threatening the crop was finished just in time to be measured.

The total yield was almost 1000 pounds to the acre - well above the 220 average California yield at that time. Both beekeeper and farmer were rewarded handsomely by the results. The word spread quickly and in four seasons California tripled its alfalfa seed production.

The saturation pollination technique was also applied to ladino and alsike clover seed production with corresponding increases. With California running three times the national average per acre for forage legume seeds, other states began to pick up California's techniques. By the 1970s and 1980s large scale saturation pollination had become the norm in US agriculture for many more crops which require bee pollination.

== A supplement or alternative to honeybees ==
Today, research is ongoing in the use of an alternative pollinator, the alfalfa leafcutter bee for alfalfa seed pollination.

== See also ==
- Pollination management
