= Kiwifruit =

Edible berries native to Northeast Asia

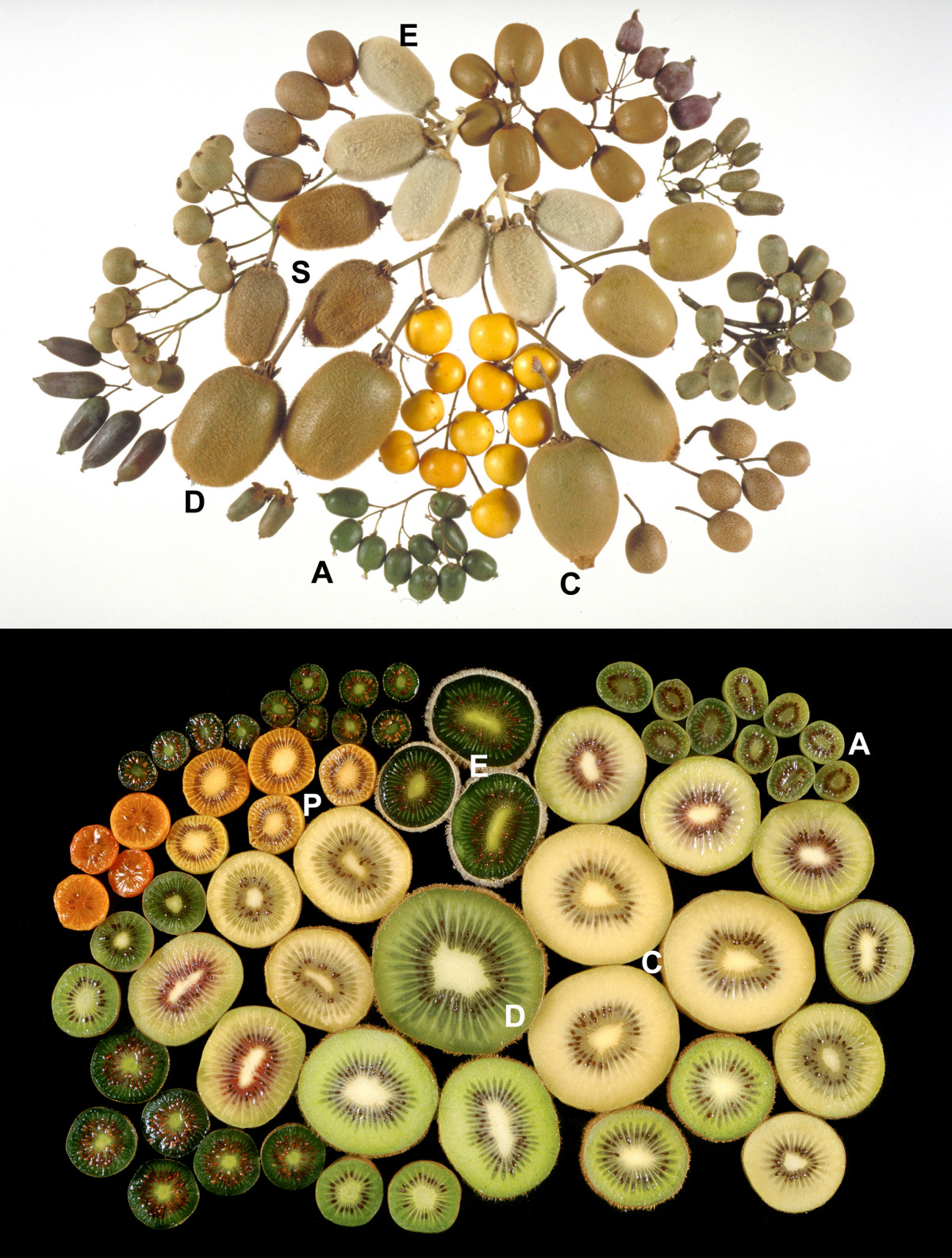
Kiwifruit by species: A = A. arguta, C = A. chinensis var. chinensis, D = A. chinensis var. deliciosa, E = A. eriantha, I = A. indochinensis, P = A. polygama, S = A. chinensis var. setosa

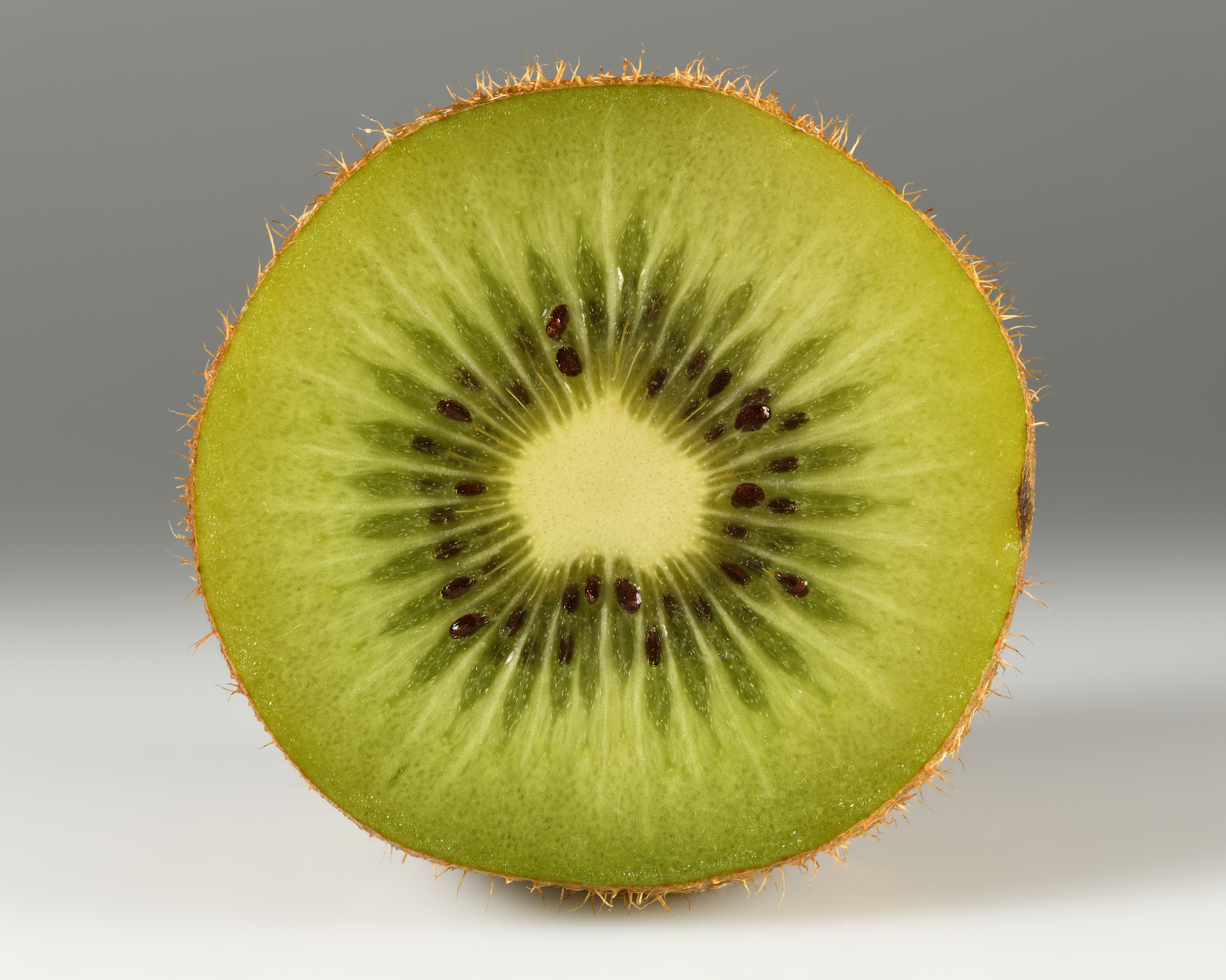
Green kiwifruit cross section

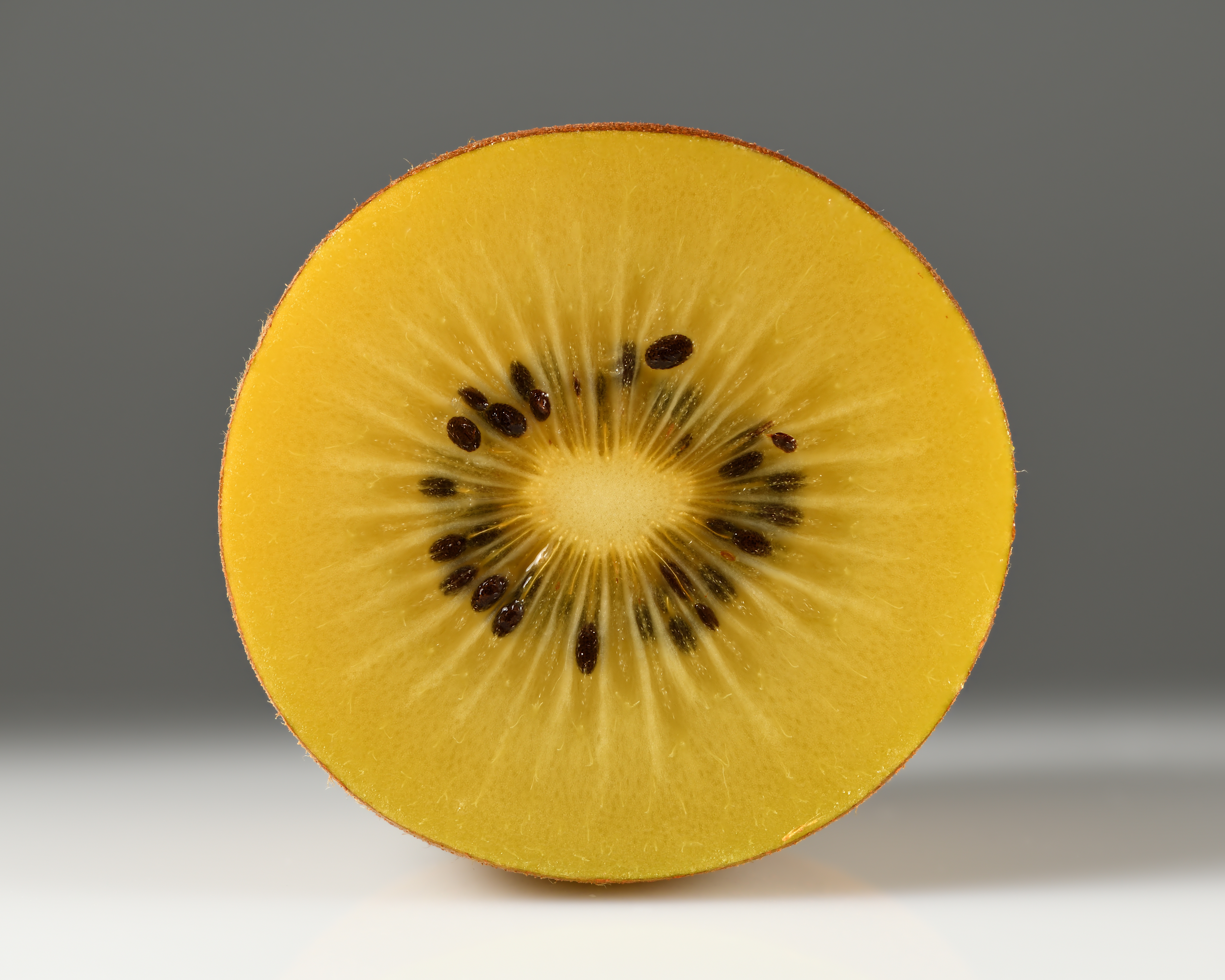
Gold kiwifruit cross section

Kiwifruit's morphology

Kiwifruit (or kiwi in some regions), or Chinese gooseberry (traditional Chinese: 獼猴桃; simplified Chinese: 猕猴桃; pinyin: míhóutáo), is the edible fruit (botanically, a berry) of several species of woody vines in the genus Actinidia. The most common cultivar group of kiwifruit (Actinidia chinensis var. deliciosa 'Hayward') is oval, about the size of a large hen's egg: 5–8 centimetres (2–3 inches) in length and 4.5–5.5 cm (1 3/4–2 1/4 in) in diameter. Kiwifruit has a thin, fuzzy, fibrous, light brown skin that is tart but edible, and light green or golden flesh that contains rows of tiny black edible seeds. The fruit has a soft texture with a sweet, sour and unique flavour.

Kiwifruit is native to central and eastern China, with the first recorded description dating back to the 12th century during the Song dynasty. In the early 20th century, cultivation of kiwifruit spread from China to New Zealand, where the first commercial plantings took place. It gained popularity among British and American servicemen stationed in New Zealand during World War II, and later became commonly exported, first to the United Kingdom and Australia from 1953, followed by California in 1959.

From the late 20th century, countries beyond New Zealand initiated independent kiwifruit breeding programmes, including China and Italy. As of 2023, China accounted for 55% of the world's total kiwifruit production, making it the largest global producer.

== Etymology ==
In 1959, Turners & Growers, a major New Zealand exporter, began using the name "kiwifruit" after being advised by a United States client, Norman Sondag, that products with the name Chinese gooseberry may have been having difficulty passing through quarantine. Sondag believed that quarantine officials were more suspicious of European gooseberries and other berry shipments, due to fears that berries that were grown closer to the ground could come into contact with soil contaminated with anthrax-causing Bacillus anthracis, something that was not an issue with kiwifruit. The name kiwifruit was coined by Jack Turner of Turners & Growers, referencing kiwi, an informal name used to describe New Zealanders, which Turner felt that American servicemen stationed in the Pacific during World War II would prefer. The name was first registered by Turners & Growers on 15 June 1959, and by 1970, all exports from New Zealand used the name kiwifruit.

Kiwifruit eventually became a common name for all commercially grown kiwifruit from the genus Actinidia. In the United States and Canada, the shortened name kiwi is commonly used when referring to the fruit.

Numerous myths are associated with the naming of kiwifruit, including that it is a reference to New Zealand's furry, brown, national bird – the kiwi, or that the name Chinese gooseberry was replaced in response to anti-Chinese sentiment in the United States. In New Zealand and Australia, the word kiwi alone either refers to the bird or is used as a nickname for New Zealanders.

== History ==
Kiwifruit
- "Kiwifruit" in Traditional (top) and Simplified (bottom) Chinese characters
- Traditional Chinese: 獼猴桃
- Simplified Chinese: 猕猴桃
- Literal meaning: "macaque peach"
Transcriptions
Standard Mandarin
- Hanyu Pinyin: míhóutáo
- IPA: [mǐ.xǒʊ.tʰǎʊ]
Yue: Cantonese
- Yale Romanization: nèih hàuh tóu
- Jyutping: nei⁴ hau⁴ tou⁴^{-}²

Alternative Chinese name
- Traditional Chinese: 狐狸桃
- Simplified Chinese: 狐狸桃
Transcriptions
Standard Mandarin
- Hanyu Pinyin: húlitáo
Yue: Cantonese
- Yale Romanization: wùh léi tòuh
- Jyutping: wu⁴ lei² tou⁴

Second alternative Chinese name
- Traditional Chinese: 藤梨
- Simplified Chinese: 藤梨
Transcriptions
Standard Mandarin
- Hanyu Pinyin: ténglí
Yue: Cantonese
- Yale Romanization: tàhng léi
- Jyutping: tang⁴ lei⁴^{-}²

Third alternative Chinese name
- Traditional Chinese: 羊桃
- Simplified Chinese: 羊桃
Transcriptions
Standard Mandarin
- Hanyu Pinyin: yángtáo
Yue: Cantonese
- Yale Romanization: yèuhng tóu
- Jyutping: joeng⁴ tou⁴^{-}²

Kiwifruit is native to central and eastern China. The first identifiable description of a plant as Actinidia chinensis is from a Tang dynasty poem by Cen Shen, which describes a mihoutao plant growing above a well in modern-day Shaanxi. The first recorded description of the kiwifruit dates to 12th century China during the Song dynasty. As it was usually collected from the wild and consumed for presumed purposes in folk medicine, the plant was rarely cultivated or bred.

Common Chinese names for the fruit prior to the 20th century include míhóutáo (Chinese: 猕猴桃, 'macaque peach'), húlítáo (Chinese: 狐狸桃, 'fox peach'), ténglí (Chinese: 藤梨, 'vine pear') and yángtáo (Chinese: 羊桃, 'sheep peach'). Among the early English language names for the fruit were yangtao, the name that was in popular use in the Yangtze River valley areas of central China, Wilson's gooseberry (after British plant collector Ernest Henry Wilson), gooseberry vine, and Ichang gooseberry, the latter referring to Yichang, a port city in Hubei province. The first known reference to the name Chinese gooseberry came from 1917 in New Zealand, but it is likely that the name was in use before this time. By the 1920s, Chinese gooseberry became the standard name for the fruit in English until the 1950s. In modern-day Chinese, the fruit is often referred to as qíyìguǒ (Chinese: 奇异果), a transliteration from English.

Cultivation of Chinese gooseberries spread from China in the early 20th century to New Zealand, where the first commercial plantings occurred. After the Hayward variety was developed, the fruit was consumed by British and American servicemen stationed in New Zealand during World War II. Kiwifruits were exported to Great Britain and Australia from 1953, and then to California from 1959.

In New Zealand during the 1940s and 1950s, the fruit became an agricultural commodity through the development of commercially viable cultivars, agricultural practices, shipping, storage, and marketing. During this time, the name kiwifruit was adopted by New Zealand exporters.

In the 1970s, New Zealand's kiwifruit industry experienced significant growth. To support this expansion, the Kiwifruit Export Promotion Committee was established in 1970 to coordinate marketing efforts and later, in 1977, the Kiwifruit Marketing Licensing Authority was formed to set market standards and advise the government, giving growers some control over licensing exporters. The New Zealand Kiwifruit Marketing Board was later renamed Zespri International Limited in 1997. This rebranding marked a strategic move to enhance global recognition and market presence.

In 1978, China established the National Cooperative Group for Kiwifruit Research, launching a nationwide survey of wild Actinidia germplasm. This effort led to the selection of over 1,400 candidate cultivars. By the early 1980s, China began cultivating kiwifruit commercially, initially planting less than one hectare with the 'Hayward' cultivar from New Zealand. Over the following decades, China's kiwifruit industry expanded significantly, and by 2020, 'Hayward' accounted for only 6.3% of total plantings, as domestically bred cultivars gained prominence.

Among these are 'Hongyang', a red-fleshed kiwifruit selected in Sichuan from seedlings raised from wild-collected seeds, 'Jinyan', a yellow-fleshed variety, and 'Donghong', another red-fleshed cultivar, also known as Oriental Red.

The Wuhan Botanical Garden of the Chinese Academy of Sciences (CAS) plays a key role in China's kiwifruit conservation and breeding. It houses the world's largest kiwifruit gene bank, with 73 validated or protected varieties and 426 high-quality strains, including Donghong, Jinyan, and Jintao. In 2001, it sold exclusive breeding rights for Jintao to the Italian company Jingold, and in 2012, a collaboration with Jingold resulted in the development and patenting of the Jinyan and Donghong cultivars.

== Species and cultivars ==
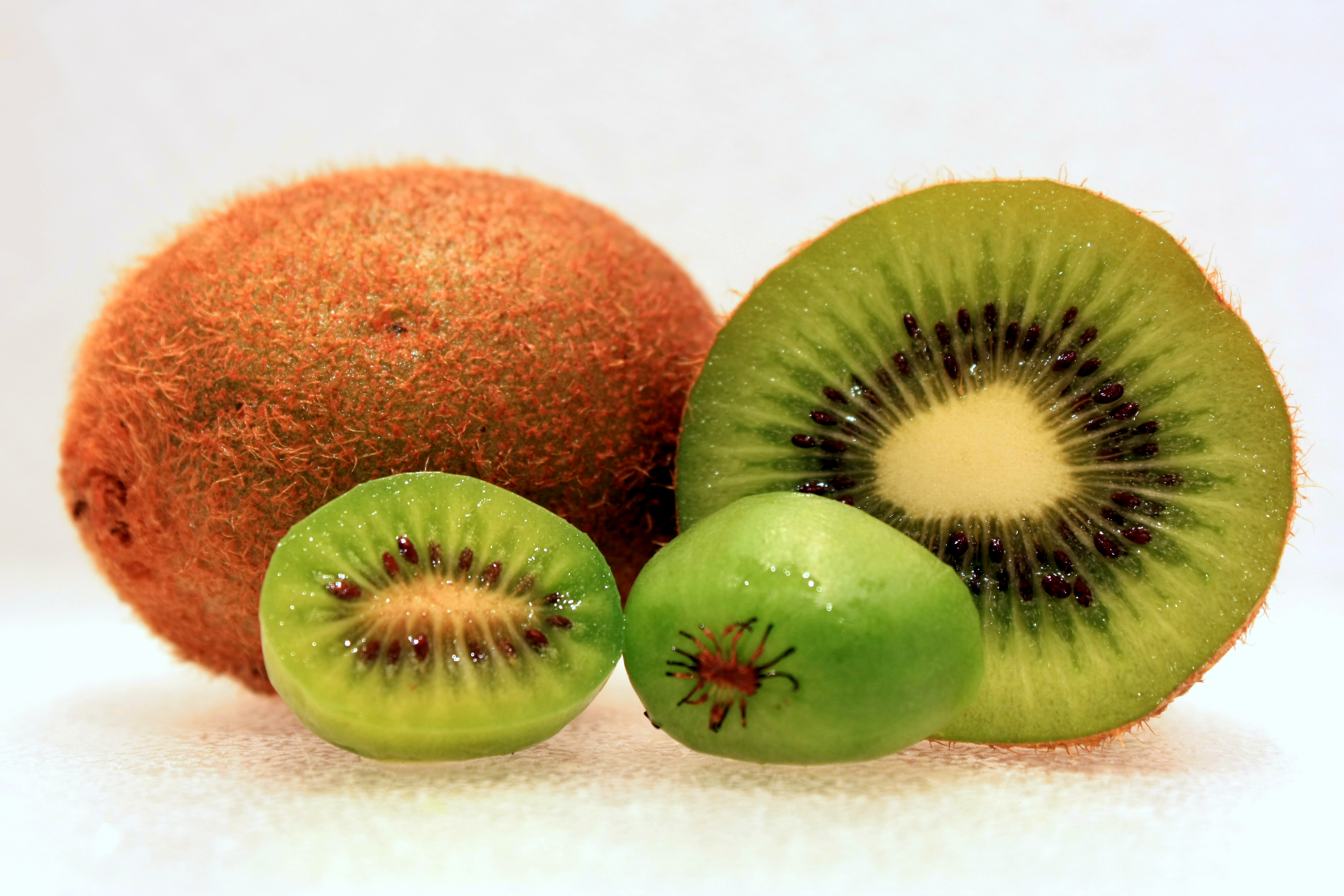
The larger A. chinensis var. deliciosa (fuzzy kiwifruit) at the rear compared to the smaller kiwi berry

The genus Actinidia comprises around 60 species. Their fruits are quite variable, although most are easily recognised as kiwifruit because of their appearance and shape. The skin of the fruit varies in size, hairiness, and colour. The flesh varies in colour, juiciness, texture, and taste. Some fruits are unpalatable, while others taste considerably better than most commercial cultivars.

The most commonly sold kiwifruit is derived from Actinidia chinensis var. deliciosa (fuzzy green kiwifruit) and A. chinensis var. chinensis (golden and red kiwifruit). Other species that are commonly eaten include A. arguta (hardy kiwifruit, also known as kiwiberries), A. rubricaulis var. coriacea (Chinese egg gooseberry), A. kolomikta (Arctic kiwifruit), A. melanandra (purple kiwifruit) and A. polygama (silver vine). Some commercial cultivars are hybrids, such as 'Jinyan', which is a hybrid of A. eriantha and A. chinensis var. chinensis, and 'Issai', a hybrid of A. arguta and A. polygama, known for having relative large fruit, the ability to self-pollinate, and being less hardy than most A. arguta.

=== Fuzzy kiwifruit ===
Most kiwifruit sold belongs to a few cultivars of Actinidia chinensis var. deliciosa (fuzzy kiwifruit): 'Hayward', 'Blake' and 'Saanichton 12'. They have a fuzzy, dull brown skin and bright green flesh. The familiar cultivar 'Hayward' was developed by Hayward Wright in Avondale, New Zealand, around 1924. It was initially grown in domestic gardens, but commercial planting began in the 1940s.

'Hayward' is the most commonly available cultivar in stores. It is a large, egg-shaped fruit with a sweet flavour. 'Saanichton 12', from British Columbia, is somewhat more rectangular than 'Hayward' and comparably sweet, but the inner core of the fruit can be tough. 'Blake' can self-pollinate, but has a smaller, more oval fruit, and the flavour is considered inferior.

=== Kiwiberries ===
Kiwiberries are edible fruits the size of a large grape, similar to fuzzy kiwifruit in taste and internal appearance but with a thin, smooth green skin. They are primarily produced by three species: Actinidia arguta (hardy kiwi), A. kolomikta (Arctic kiwifruit) and A. polygama (silver vine). They are fast-growing, climbing vines, durable over their growing season. They are referred to as kiwi berry, baby kiwi, dessert kiwi, grape kiwi, or cocktail kiwi. Some kiwiberries may require harvesting after a frost, known as bletting, in order to soften.

=== Gold kiwifruit ===
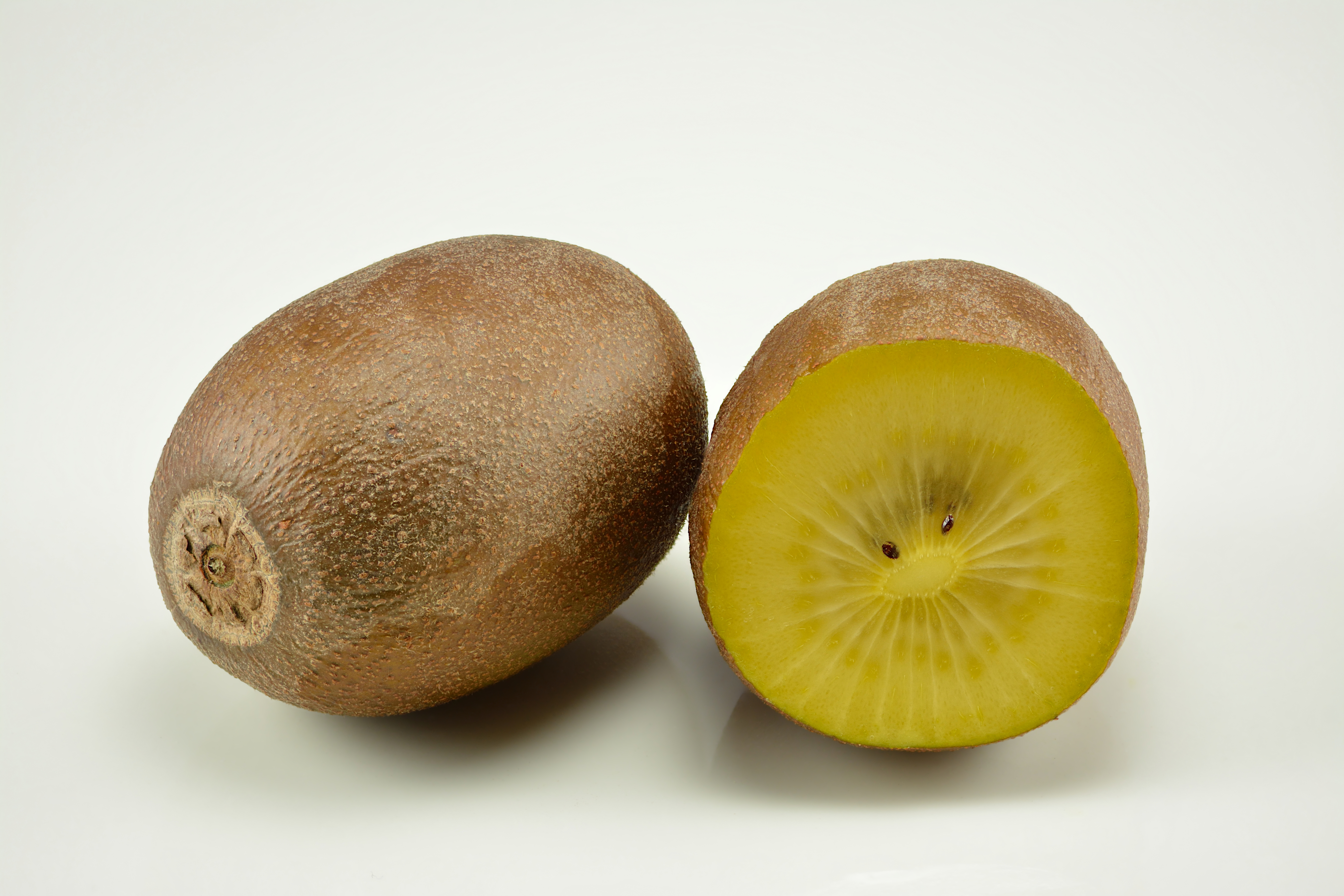
Golden kiwifruit 'Soreli'

The gold kiwifruit, also known as the yellow kiwi or golden kiwifruit, has smooth, bronze skin, with a beak shape at the stem attachment. Gold varieties are typically cultivars of Actinidia chinensis var. chinensis. The flesh colour varies from bright green to a clear, intense yellow. This species is 'sweeter and more aromatic' in flavour compared to Actinidia chinensis var. deliciosa. One of the most attractive varieties has a red 'iris' around the centre of the fruit and yellow flesh outside. The yellow fruit obtains a higher market price and, being less hairy than the fuzzy kiwifruit, tastes better without peeling.

Hort16A is a golden kiwifruit cultivar developed by HortResearch, now Plant & Food Research Institute, during the 1980s and 1990s. It is marketed worldwide as Zespri Gold. This cultivar suffered significant losses in New Zealand in 2010–2013 due to the PSA bacterium. A new cultivar of golden kiwifruit, Gold3, was found to be more disease-resistant, and most growers have now changed to this cultivar. 'Gold3', marketed by Zespri as SunGold is not quite as sweet as 'Hort16A', and lacks its usually slightly pointed tip. Clones of the new variety SunGold have been used to develop orchards in China, resulting in partially successful legal efforts in China by Zespri to protect their intellectual property. In 2021, Zespri estimated that around 5,000 hectares of Sungold orchards were being cultivated in China, mainly in the Sichuan province.

Jintao is a variety of golden kiwifruit developed in China from wild Actinidia chinensis var. chinensis vines. Created in the 1980s by researchers at the Wuhan Botanical Garden, it was introduced to Europe for evaluation in 1998 through an EU-funded project (INCO-DC). Between 1998 and 2000, it was evaluated in collaboration with institutions such as I.N.R.A. in Bordeaux (France), the University of Thessaloniki (Greece), and the University of Udine (Italy). Jintao was later released to European kiwifruit growers for commercial propagation in 2001. In the same year, exclusive breeding rights for the variety were sold to the Italian company Jingold, and production subsequently expanded to multiple locations across Portugal, Chile, Argentina, and South Africa over the following two decades.

=== Red kiwifruit ===
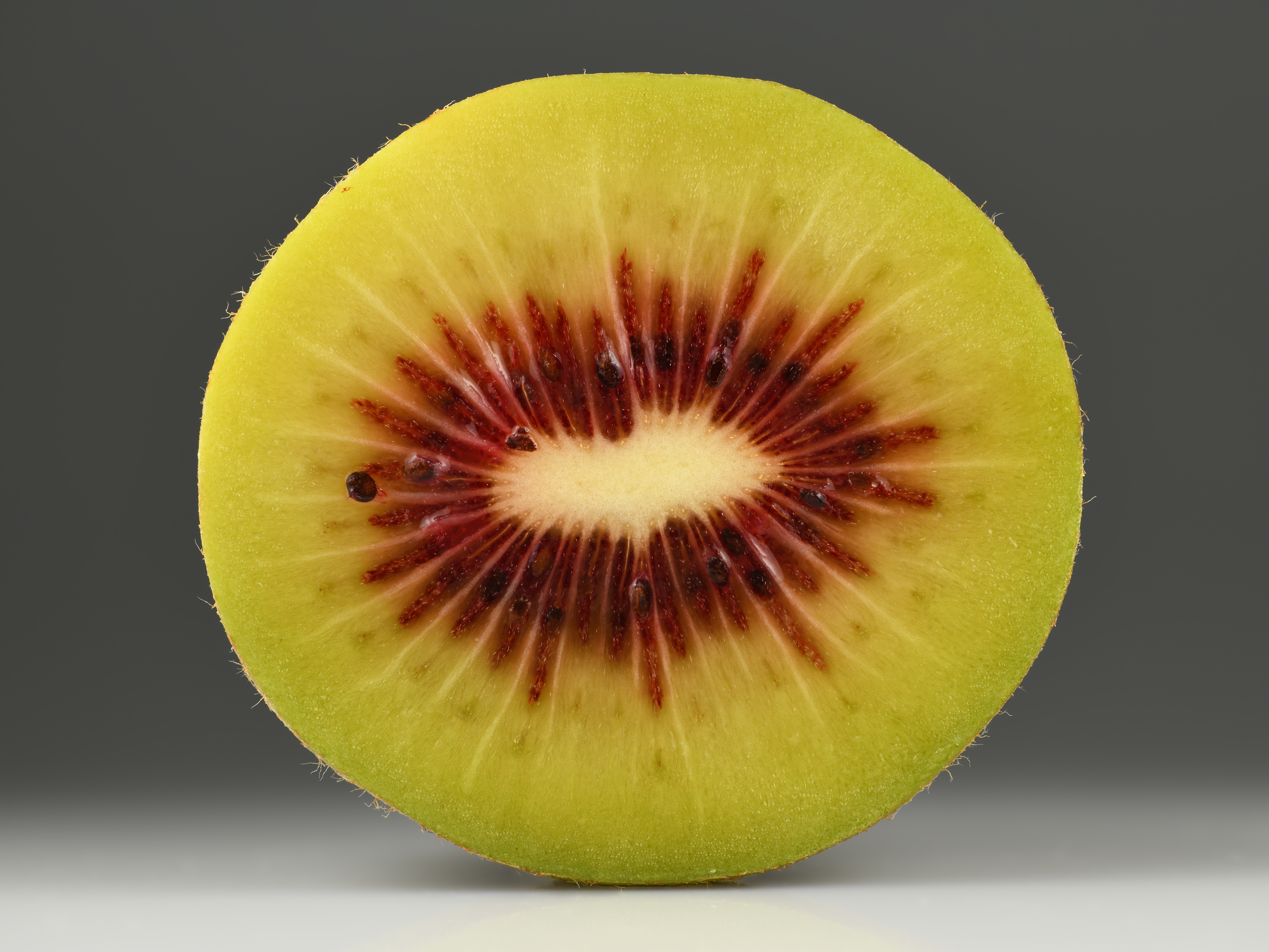
Kiwifruit 'Red Passion' with a red ring

Red kiwifruits are cultivars of Actinidia chinensis var. chinensis, distinguished by their red coloured flesh. Its origin can be traced back to China from a natural mutation of gold kiwifruit found in the wild in 1982, which became the Hongyang variety, China's first commercially viable red kiwifruit cultivar. By 2020, Hongyang became the most grown kiwifruit cultivar in China across all types and varieties.

International varieties include Oriental Red, a licensed version of Donghong variety kiwifruit grown in Italy, Zespri RubyRed, which was independently bred in New Zealand in 2007, and EnzaRed, a cultivar that descends from the Hongyang variety grown by Turners & Growers in New Zealand.

== Cultivation ==
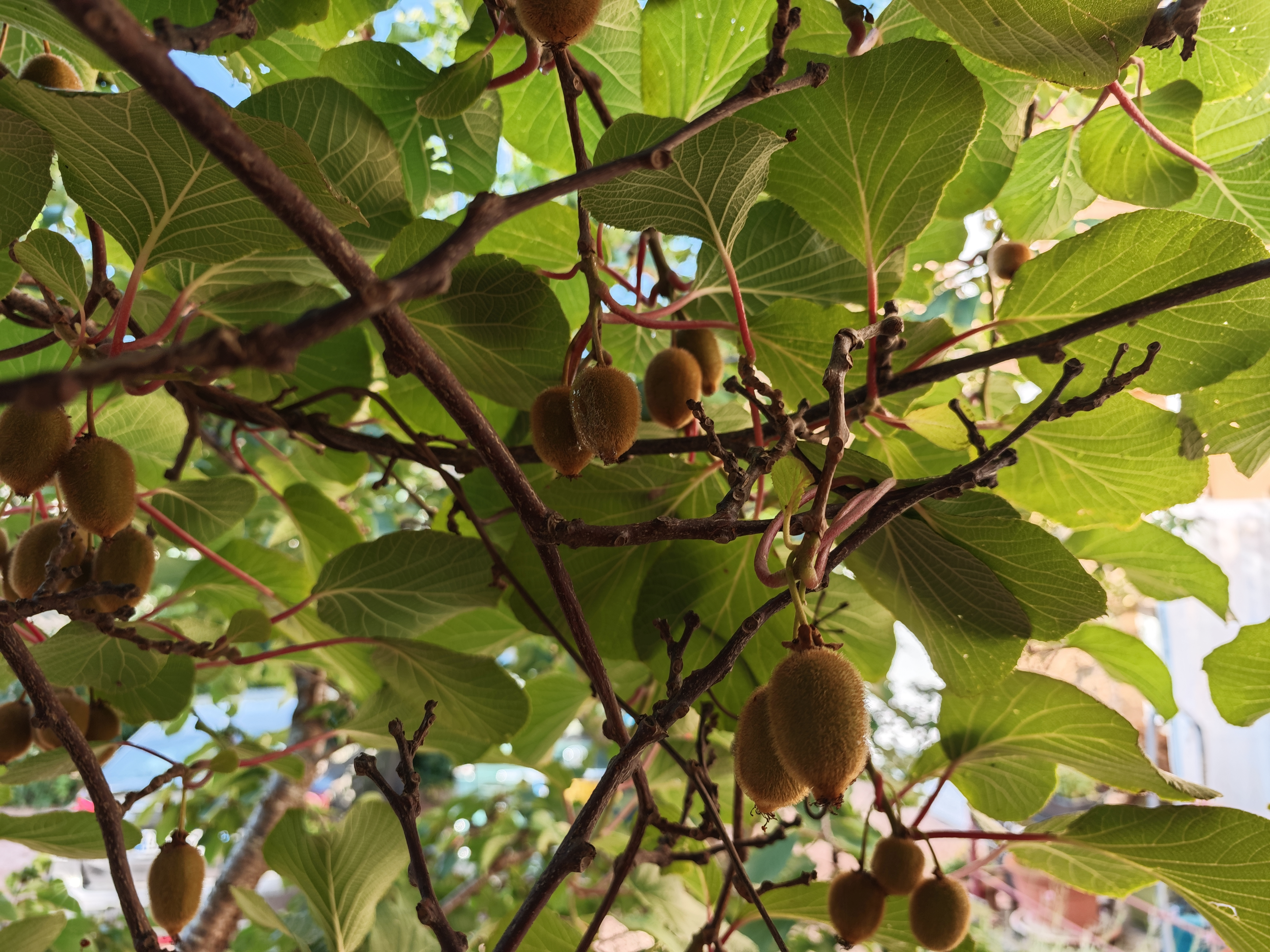
Kiwifruit developing on Actinidia vines

Kiwifruit can be grown in most temperate climates with adequate summer heat. Where fuzzy kiwifruit (Actinidia chinensis var. deliciosa) is not hardy, other species can be grown as substitutes.

=== Breeding ===
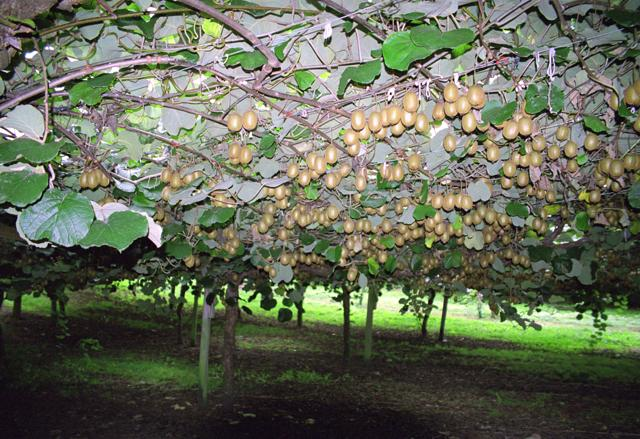
Kiwifruit growing on supported vine

Often in commercial farming, different breeds are used for rootstock, fruit-bearing plants, and pollinators. Therefore, the seeds produced are crossbreeds of their parents. Even if the same breeds are used for pollinators and fruit-bearing plants, there is no guarantee that the fruit will have the same quality as the parent. Additionally, seedlings take seven years before they flower, so determining whether the kiwifruit is fruit bearing or a pollinator is time-consuming. Therefore, most kiwifruits, except rootstock and new cultivars, are propagated asexually. This is done by grafting the fruit-producing plant onto rootstock grown from seedlings or, if the plant is desired to be a true cultivar, rootstock grown from cuttings of a mature plant.

=== Pollination ===
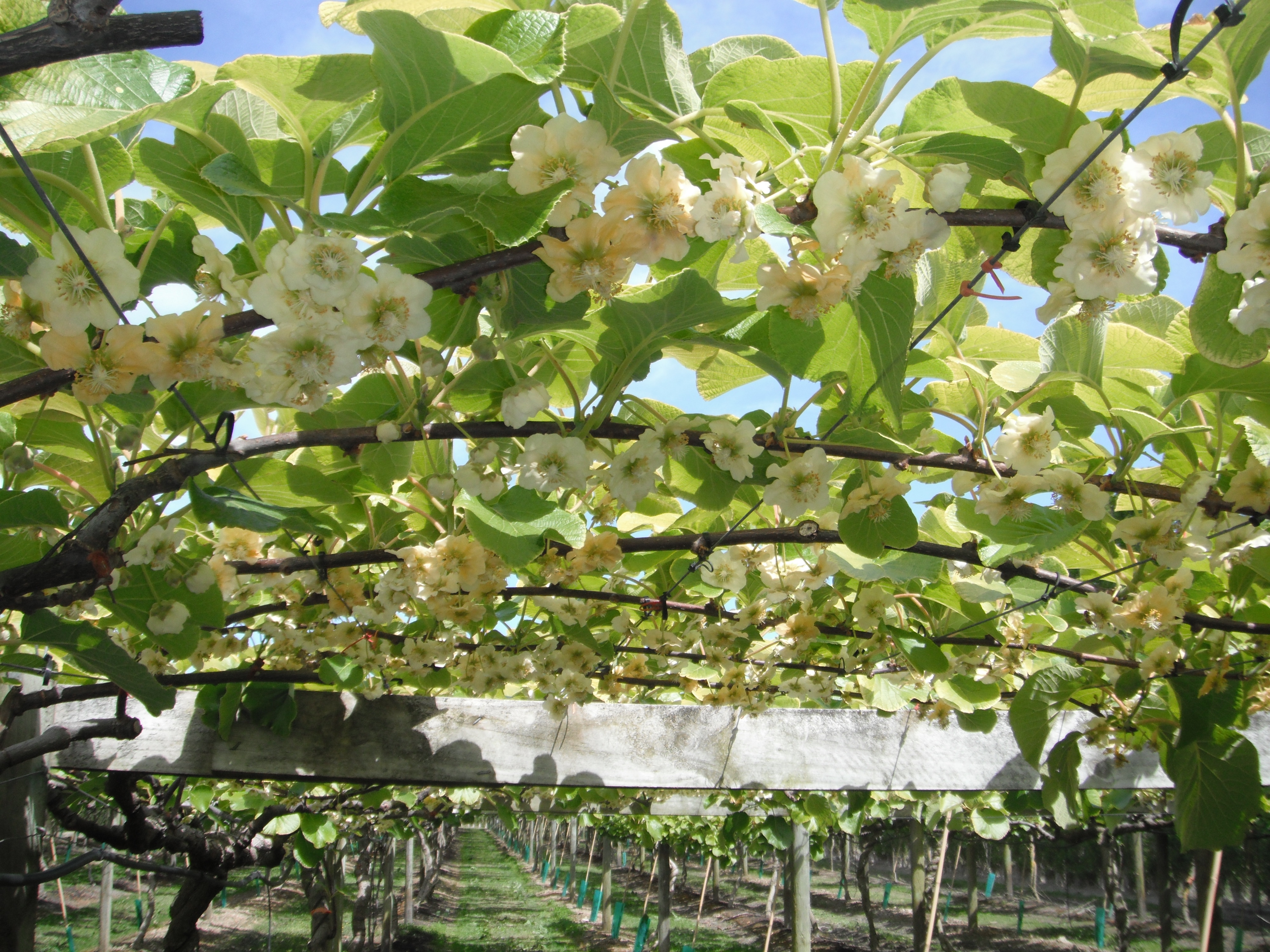
Kiwifruit flowering

Kiwifruit plants generally are dioecious, meaning a plant is either male or female. The male plants have flowers that produce pollen, the females receive the pollen to fertilise their ovules and grow fruit; most kiwifruit requires a male plant to pollinate the female plant. For a good yield of fruit, one male vine for every three to eight female vines is considered adequate. Some varieties can self-pollinate, but even they produce a greater and more reliable yield when pollinated by male kiwifruit. Cross-species pollination is often (but not always) successful as long as bloom times are synchronised.

In nature, the species are pollinated by birds and native bumblebees, which visit the flowers for pollen, not nectar. The female flowers produce fake anthers with what appears to be pollen on the tips to attract the pollinators, although these fake anthers lack the DNA and food value of the male anthers.

Kiwifruit growers rely on honey bees, the principal 'for-hire' pollinator, but commercially grown kiwifruit is notoriously difficult to pollinate. The flowers are not very attractive to honey bees, partly because the flowers do not produce nectar, and bees quickly learn to prefer flowers with nectar.

Honey bees are inefficient cross-pollinators for kiwifruit because they practice "floral fidelity". Each honey bee visits only a single type of flower in any foray and maybe only a few branches of a single plant. The pollen needed from a different plant (such as a male for a female kiwifruit) might never reach it were it not for the cross-pollination that principally occurs in the crowded colony; it is in the colonies that bees laden with different pollen cross paths.

To deal with these pollination challenges, some producers blow collected pollen over the female flowers. Most common, though, is saturation pollination, in which the honey bee populations are made so large (by placing hives in the orchards at a concentration of about 8 hives per hectare) that bees are forced to use this flower because of intense competition for all flowers within flight distance.

=== Maturation and harvest ===
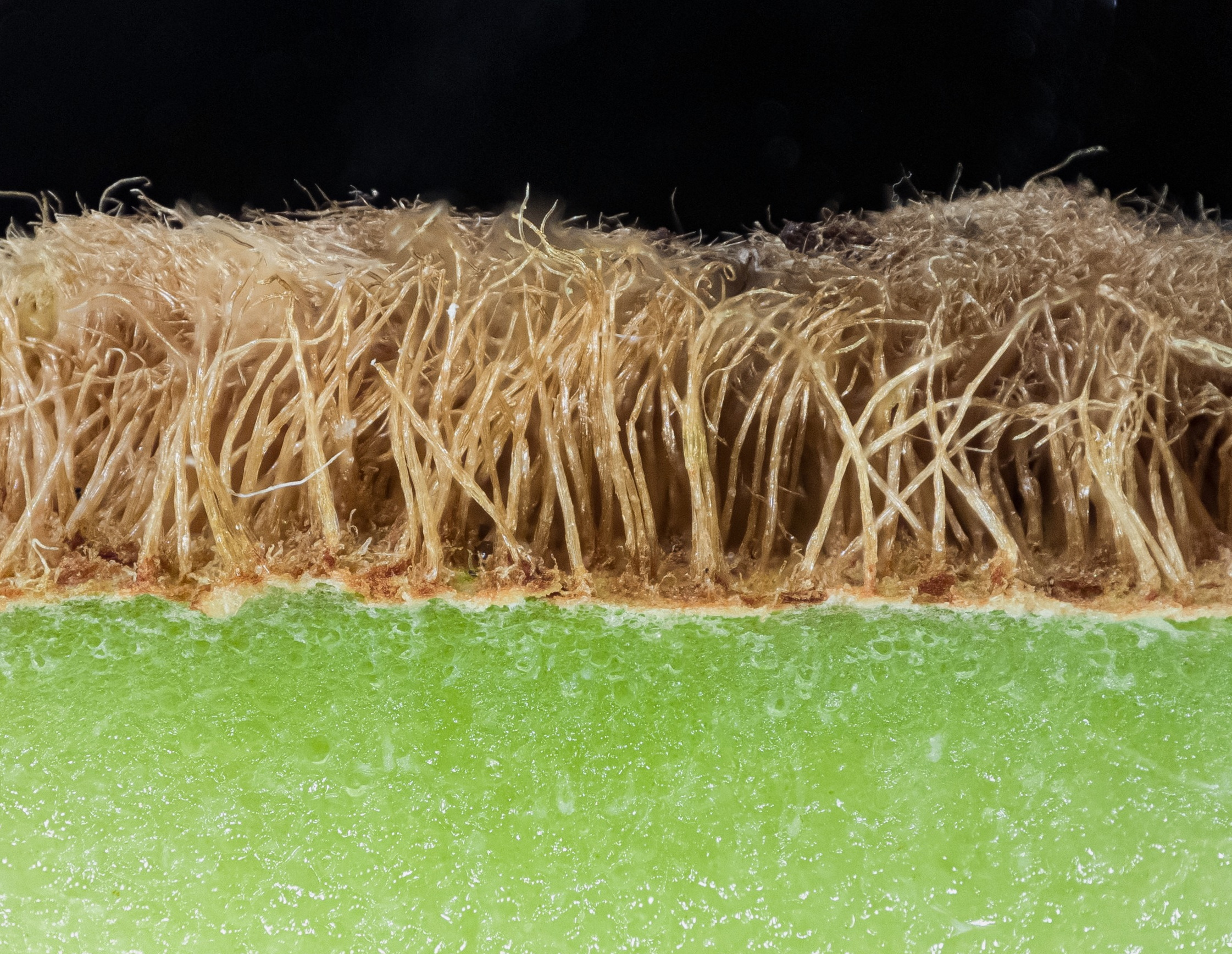
Close-up of kiwifruit skin

Kiwifruit is picked by hand and commercially grown on sturdy support structures, as it can produce several tonnes per hectare, more than the rather weak vines can support. These are generally equipped with a watering system for irrigation and frost protection in the spring.

Kiwifruit vines require vigorous pruning, similar to that of grapevines. Fruit is borne on 'one-year-old and older' canes, but production declines as each cane ages. Canes should be pruned off and replaced after their third year. In the northern hemisphere, the fruit ripens in November, while in the southern hemisphere it ripens in May. Four-year-old plants can produce 15 tonnes of fruit per hectare (14,000 lb per acre) while eight-year-old plants can produce 20 tonnes (18,000 lb per acre). The plants produce their maximum at eight to ten years old. The seasonal yields are variable; a heavy crop on a vine one season generally comes with a light crop the following season.

=== Storage ===
Fruit harvested when firm will ripen when stored properly for long periods. This allows fruit to be stored for up to 8 weeks after harvest.

Firm kiwifruits ripen after a few days to a week when stored at room temperature, but should not be kept in direct sunlight. Faster ripening occurs when placed in a paper bag with an apple, a pear, or a banana. Once a kiwifruit is ripe, however, it is preserved optimally when stored far from other fruits, as it is sensitive to the ethylene gas they may emit, thereby tending to over-ripen even in the refrigerator. If stored appropriately, ripe kiwifruit is normally kept for about one to two weeks.

=== Pests and diseases ===
Pseudomonas syringae pv. actinidiae (PSA) was first identified in Japan in the 1980s. This bacterial strain has been controlled and managed successfully in orchards in Asia. In 1992, it was found in northern Italy. In 2007/2008, economic losses were observed, as a more virulent strain became more dominant (PSA V). In 2010 it was found in New Zealand's Bay of Plenty Region kiwifruit orchards in the North Island. The yellow-fleshed cultivars were particularly susceptible. New, resistant varieties were selected in research funded by the government and fruit growers so that the industry could continue.

Scientists reported they had worked out that the strain of PSA affecting kiwifruit from New Zealand, Italy, and Chile originated in China.

=== Early sex identification ===
In 2020, the Wuhan Botanical Research Institute of the Chinese Academy of Sciences patented a method for the early identification of the sex of kiwifruit plants.

Kiwifruit plants are dioecious, meaning they have separate male and female plants. Crosses between male and female genotypes typically produce male and female offspring in a 1:1 ratio, regardless of ploidy level. Since only female plants bear fruit, male plants are unproductive in commercial breeding programmes, though they are required for pollination to produce the desired amount of fruit. Maintaining male seedlings beyond the sex ratio required for pollination (one male vine for every three to eight female vines) consumes land, labour, and resources without contributing to fruit yield. The breeding process is further hindered by the species' long generation cycle, spanning at least three growing seasons and a period of winter dormancy. Managing large breeding populations over extended periods is resource-intensive, especially for fruit crops like kiwifruit, which require expensive support infrastructure.

To address these challenges, there is a pressing need for sex-linked molecular markers. Early identification of plant sex at the seedling stage enables the efficient removal of male plants, reducing resource waste and improving breeding efficiency.

== Production ==
Kiwifruit production 2023, tonnes
| China | 2,362,658 |
| New Zealand | 662,744 |
| Italy | 391,100 |
| Greece | 317,080 |
| Iran | 295,142 |
| Chile | 116,029 |
| World | 4,433,060 |
Source: FAOSTAT of the United Nations

In 2023, world kiwifruit production was 4.4 million tonnes, led by China with 55% of the total (table). In China, kiwifruit is grown mainly in the mountainous area upstream of the Yangtze River, as well as Sichuan. Other major producers were New Zealand and Italy (table).

Production of kiwi

Kiwi yield

=== Production history ===
==== New Zealand ====
Kiwifruit exports rapidly increased from the late 1960s to the early 1970s in New Zealand. By 1976, exports exceeded the amount consumed domestically. Outside of Australasia, New Zealand kiwifruit are marketed under the brand-name label Zespri. The general name, "Zespri", has been used for the marketing of all cultivars of kiwifruit from New Zealand since 2012. In 1990, the New Zealand Kiwifruit Marketing Board opened an office for Europe in Antwerp, Belgium.

==== Italy ====
In the 1980s, Italy began cultivating and exporting kiwifruit, leveraging its existing grape-growing infrastructure and techniques. Italy developed yellow-fleshed cultivars, including "Soreli" and "Dorì". Its proximity to the European market further boosted production, and by 1989, Italy had become the world's leading kiwifruit producer. Italy's growing season does not significantly overlap with those of New Zealand or Chile, reducing direct competition with these major exporters.

==== China ====
In 1978, China began developing its own kiwifruit cultivars. The Wuhan Botanical Garden, part of the Chinese Academy of Sciences (CAS), played a large role in breeding and improving domestic varieties suited to local conditions. Commercial cultivation initially began in the early 1980s on less than one hectare using the Hayward variety from New Zealand. But by 2020, kiwifruit orchards had expanded to 290,000 hectares, and 'Hayward' accounted for only 6.3% of the total planting area, as domestically bred varieties gained prominence. To support commercialisation and branding, CASGOLD, the first CAS-backed agricultural brand, was created. By 2023, China had become the world's largest kiwifruit producer, surpassing Italy and New Zealand. However, most of its kiwifruit is consumed domestically, with little exported.

== Human consumption ==
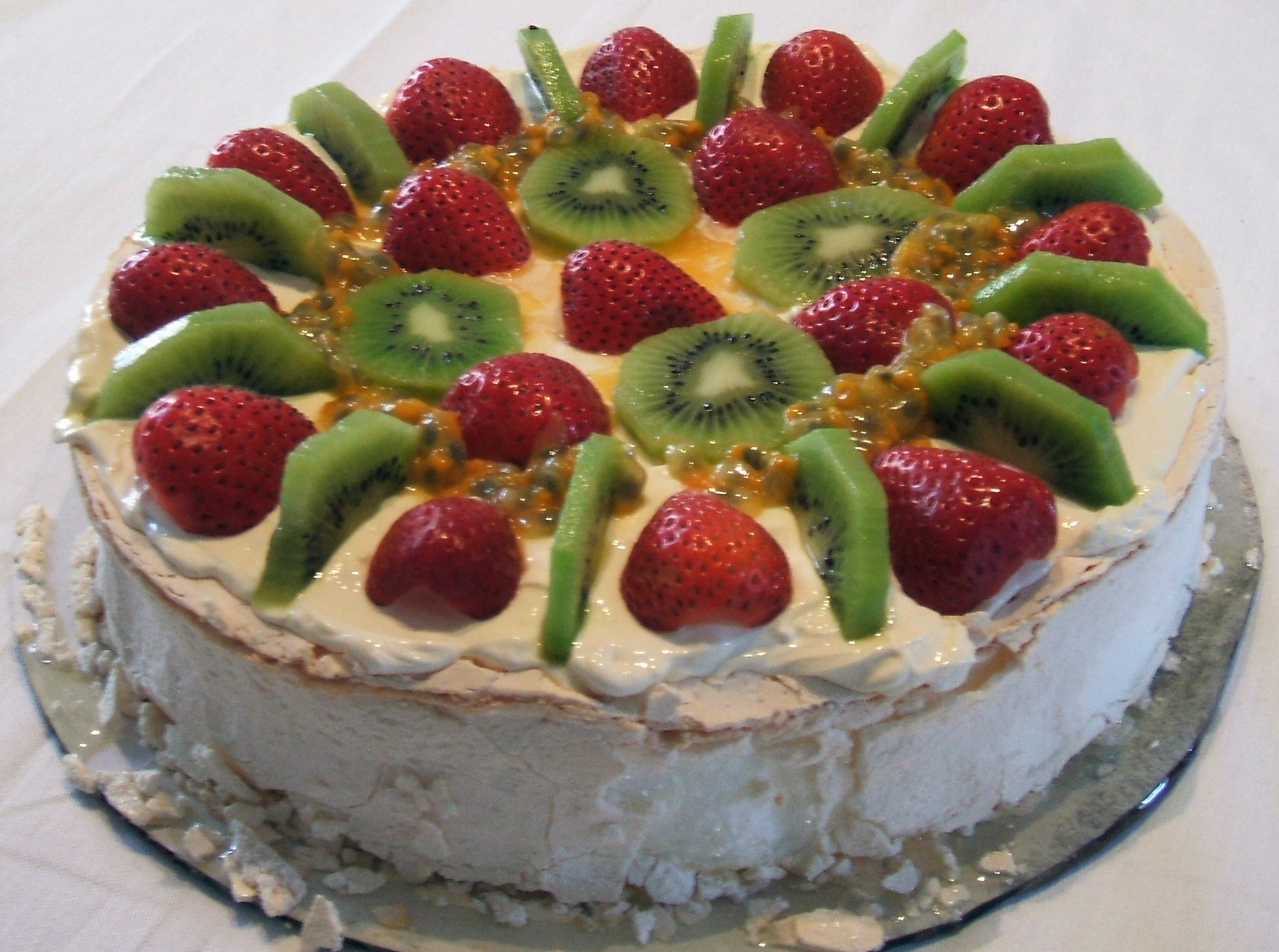
A pavlova with strawberries, passionfruit, kiwifruit and cream

Kiwifruit, Zespri SunGold, raw
Nutritional value per 100 g (3.5 oz)
- Energy: 262 kJ (63 kcal)
- Carbohydrates: 15.8 g
- Sugars: 12.3 g
- Dietary fibre: 1.4 g
- Fat: 0.28 g
- Protein: 1.02 g
Vitamins and minerals
| Vitamins | Quantity %DV^{†} |
| Vitamin A equiv. lutein zeaxanthin | 24 μg |
| Thiamine (B1) | 0% 0 mg |
| Riboflavin (B2) | 6% 0.074 mg |
| Niacin (B3) | 1% 0.231 mg |
| Pantothenic acid (B5) | 2% 0.12 mg |
| Vitamin B6 | 5% 0.079 mg |
| Folate (B9) | 8% 31 μg |
| Vitamin B12 | 3% 0.08 μg |
| Choline | 0% 1.9 mg |
| Vitamin C | 179% 161.3 mg |
| Vitamin E | 9% 1.4 mg |
| Vitamin K | 5% 6.1 μg |
| Minerals | Quantity %DV^{†} |
| Calcium | 1% 17 mg |
| Copper | 17% 0.151 mg |
| Iron | 1% 0.21 mg |
| Magnesium | 3% 12 mg |
| Manganese | 2% 0.048 mg |
| Phosphorus | 2% 25 mg |
| Potassium | 11% 315 mg |
| Selenium | 1% 0.4 μg |
| Sodium | 0% 3 mg |
| Zinc | 1% 0.08 mg |
- Other constituents: Quantity
- Water: 82 g
- Link to USDA FoodData Central entry
- ^{†}Percentages estimated using US recommendations for adults, except for potassium, which is estimated based on expert recommendation from the National Academies.

Kiwifruit, green, raw
Nutritional value per 100 g (3.5 oz)
- Energy: 255 kJ (61 kcal)
- Carbohydrates: 14.66 g
- Sugars: 8.99 g
- Dietary fibre: 3 g
- Fat: 0.52 g
- Protein: 1.14 g
Vitamins and minerals
| Vitamins | Quantity %DV^{†} |
| Vitamin A equiv. lutein zeaxanthin | 122 μg |
| Thiamine (B1) | 2% 0.027 mg |
| Riboflavin (B2) | 2% 0.025 mg |
| Niacin (B3) | 2% 0.341 mg |
| Pantothenic acid (B5) | 4% 0.183 mg |
| Vitamin B6 | 4% 0.063 mg |
| Folate (B9) | 6% 25 μg |
| Vitamin B12 | 0% 0 μg |
| Choline | 1% 7.8 mg |
| Vitamin C | 103% 92.7 mg |
| Vitamin E | 10% 1.46 mg |
| Vitamin K | 34% 40.3 μg |
| Minerals | Quantity %DV^{†} |
| Calcium | 3% 34 mg |
| Copper | 14% 0.13 mg |
| Iron | 2% 0.31 mg |
| Magnesium | 4% 17 mg |
| Manganese | 4% 0.098 mg |
| Phosphorus | 3% 34 mg |
| Potassium | 10% 312 mg |
| Selenium | 0% 0.2 μg |
| Sodium | 0% 3 mg |
| Zinc | 1% 0.14 mg |
- Other constituents: Quantity
- Water: 83 g
- Link to USDA FoodData Central entry
- ^{†}Percentages estimated using US recommendations for adults, except for potassium, which is estimated based on expert recommendation from the National Academies.

Kiwifruit may be eaten raw, made into juices, used in baked goods, prepared with meat, or used as a garnish. The whole fruit, including the skin, is suitable for human consumption; however, the skin of the fuzzy varieties is often discarded due to its texture. Sliced kiwifruit is often used as a garnish on top of whipped cream on pavlova, a meringue-based dessert. Traditionally in China, kiwifruit was not eaten for pleasure but was given as medicine to children to help them grow and to women who had given birth to help them recover.

Raw kiwifruit contains actinidain (also spelled actinidin) which is commercially useful as a meat tenderiser and possibly as a digestive aid. Actinidain also makes raw kiwifruit unsuitable for use in desserts containing milk or any other dairy products because the enzyme digests milk proteins. This applies to gelatine-based desserts since the actinidain will dissolve the proteins in gelatine, causing the dessert to either liquefy or prevent it from solidifying.

=== Nutrition ===
Raw green kiwifruit is 83% water and 15% carbohydrates, with negligible protein and fat (table). In a reference amount of 100 grams (3.5 oz), kiwifruit provides 61 calories of food energy, and is rich (20% or more of the Daily Value, DV) in vitamin C (103% DV) and vitamin K (34% DV), with moderate content of vitamin E (10% DV), copper (14% DV), and potassium (10% DV), with no other micronutrients in significant content (green, table). Gold kiwifruit has similar nutritional content, but contains a higher level of vitamin C (179% DV) and insignificant vitamin K (gold, table). Both types of kiwifruit supply dietary fibre.

Kiwifruit seed oil contains, on average, 62% alpha-linolenic acid, an omega-3 fatty acid. Kiwifruit pulp contains carotenoids, such as provitamin A beta-carotene, lutein and zeaxanthin.

=== European health claim ===
In July 2025, following an application by Zespri International Ltd. and scientific review in 2021 by the European Food Safety Authority, the European Commission authorised a health claim: "consumption of green kiwifruit contributes to normal bowel function by increasing stool frequency," when at least 200 g (7.1 oz) of fresh Hayward green kiwifruit are consumed daily.

=== Allergies ===
Allergy to kiwifruit was first described in 1981 and there have since been reports of the allergy presenting with numerous symptoms from localised oral allergy syndrome to life-threatening anaphylaxis.

The enzyme actinidain found in kiwifruit can be an allergen for some individuals, with the most common symptoms ranging from an unpleasant itching and soreness of the mouth to wheezing as the most common severe symptom.
