= Actinidain =

Class of enzymes

actinidain
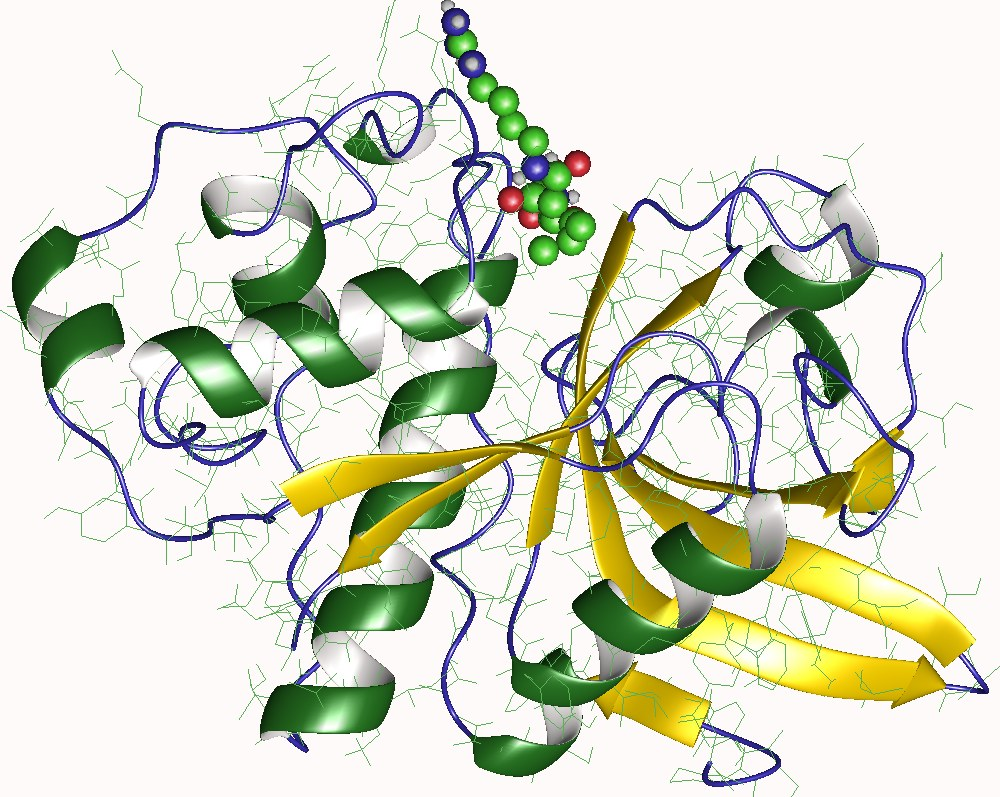
- Biological assembly image of actinidain from Actinidia chinensis. From PDB: 1AEC.

Identifiers
- EC no.: 3.4.22.14
- CAS no.: 39279-27-1

Databases
- BRENDA: enzyme data
- ExPASy: NiceZyme view
- KEGG: enzyme entry
- MetaCyc: metabolic pathway
- Rhea: reactions
- PDB structures: RCSB PDB PDBe PDBsum
- Gene Ontology: AmiGO / QuickGO
Search
- PMC: articles
- PubMed: articles
- NCBI: proteins

Actinidain (EC 3.4.22.14, actinidin, Actinidia anionic protease, proteinase A2 of Actinidia chinensis) is a type of cysteine protease enzyme found in fruits, including kiwifruit (genus Actinidia), pineapple, mango, banana, figs, and papaya. It is part of the peptidase C1 family of papain-like proteases.

Actinidain is an allergen in kiwifruit.

Actinidain is commercially used as a meat tenderizer and in coagulating milk for dairy products, like yogurt and cheese. The denaturation temperature of actinidain is 60 °C (140 °F), lower than that of similar meat tenderizing enzymes bromelain from pineapple and papain from papaya.

== History ==
Actinidain was first identified in 1959 when A.C. Arcus examined why jellies made with kiwifruit did not solidify, an effect caused by a proteolytic enzyme acting on gelatin. This enzyme was named actinidin as it was identified in a fruit of the genus Actinidia (Actinidia chinensis). While similar proteins have been found in other fruits, this cysteine protease is unique to the kiwifruit. A thiol group was identified to be essential for enzyme activity, which is why it was grouped with enzymes like papain and bromelain.

== Function ==
While no clear function has been identified, the enzyme begins to accumulate in the immature fruit and is suspected to be important for fruit development. Actinidain has a detrimental effect on the larvae of Spodoptera litura, although its use as a pesticide has not been established. It may also be used as a storage protein.

== Sequence and structure ==
Actinidain has an enzyme classification number (EC) of 3.4.22.14. The 3 classifies it as a hydrolase. It is further classified as acting on peptide bonds, also known as a peptidase (3.4). The .22 represents the cysteine endopeptidases and then the .14 is actinidain’s unique identifier within that group. Actinidain is first produced in the kiwifruit when it is about half its size and then increases in both protease activity and enzyme production until the fruit is fully matured. The enzyme is encoded by a large gene family and is expressed in most tissues of the kiwifruit plant, not just the fruit itself.

Actinidain is similar to papain in size, shape, active site location and conformation, as well as in kinetic studies, which is especially interesting as they only share 48% amino acid similarity. Electron density mapping shows similar α-helices and overall polypeptide folding. While the electron density map indicates 218 amino acids, further sequencing work suggests 220 amino acids with the extra two being found at the C-terminus. The active site includes cysteine and histidine residues that are conserved across several other proteins in the fruit peptidase family. Electron density mapping indicates a double crossover with domain 1 being made up of AA 19-115 and 214-218 and domain II composing of AA 1-18 and 116-213, with both the N-terminal and the C-terminal ends crossing over into both domains. Domain 1 has several α-helices whereas domain 2 is primarily made up of one anti-parallel β-sheet. Actinidain comprises up to 50% of the soluble protein content in kiwifruits at harvest. Actinidain is active over a wide range of pH, including very acidic conditions, with a pH optimum from 5-7. At least ten different isoforms that all have the same molecular weight and cysteine protease activity as actinidain have been identified but they vary in isoelectric point from acidic (pI 3.9) to basic (pI 9.3).

== Allergic potential ==
Actinidain is the major allergen in kiwifruit, with the reaction presenting as mild symptoms in the mouth.

== Food applications ==
Actinidain is used as a high-quality meat tenderizer. When marinating with pork, actinidain was found to tenderize it by affecting the myofibrils and connective tissue, which are similar to the tissues that are broken down through mechanical tenderization.

Studies have shown that actinidain might be a good alternative milk coagulant, replacing chymosin (rennin), a common coagulant used in cheese making.

== See also ==
- Bromelain
- Papain
- Cysteine protease
- Peptidase
