= Chennault House =

Chennault House may refer to:

in the United States (by state)

- Chennault House (Danburg, Georgia), listed on the National Register of Historic Places (NRHP) in Lincoln County
- Chennault House (Gilbert, Louisiana), listed on the NRHP in Franklin Parish

== See also ==
- Chenault House (disambiguation)
