= Léon Chenault =

Léon Chenault (1853–1930) was a French nurseryman and botanist best known for his nurseries at Orléans, where he raised a vast range of plants, notably roses, from seeds and cuttings obtained from foreign sources such as Kew and the Arnold Arboretum. In recognition of his industry and expertise, Chenault was made a Chevalier of the Legion d'honneur in 1929.

== Early life ==
Chenault was born in Orléans in 1853 to Marcel, a gardener, and Marie, a housewife. On leaving school, he was apprenticed to a garden at Briolay.

== Career ==
Chenault founded his own nursery, 'Chenault et Fils', which flourished; his catalog of 1914 listed over 3000 plants, with several varieties named for him. His horticultural skills were legendary, and he was revered by his staff as 'the master'. However, by the time of his death in 1930, the nursery had lost its international market owing to the Great Depression and was in serious financial difficulties.

== Personal life ==
Chenault married Delphine on 2 December 1882; they had two children, Raymond in 1885 and Germaine in 1889.

== Death ==
Chenault died at his home in Orléans on 27 January 1930. He is commemorated by a bust sculpted by Charles Million in 1931 and erected in the Parc Louis-Pasteur, Orléans. In 1995, the town of Orléans dedicated a park to his memory in the church of Saint-Marceau in the quarter that had witnessed his birth, work, and death.
