= ScienceAtHome =

Danish citizen science web portal

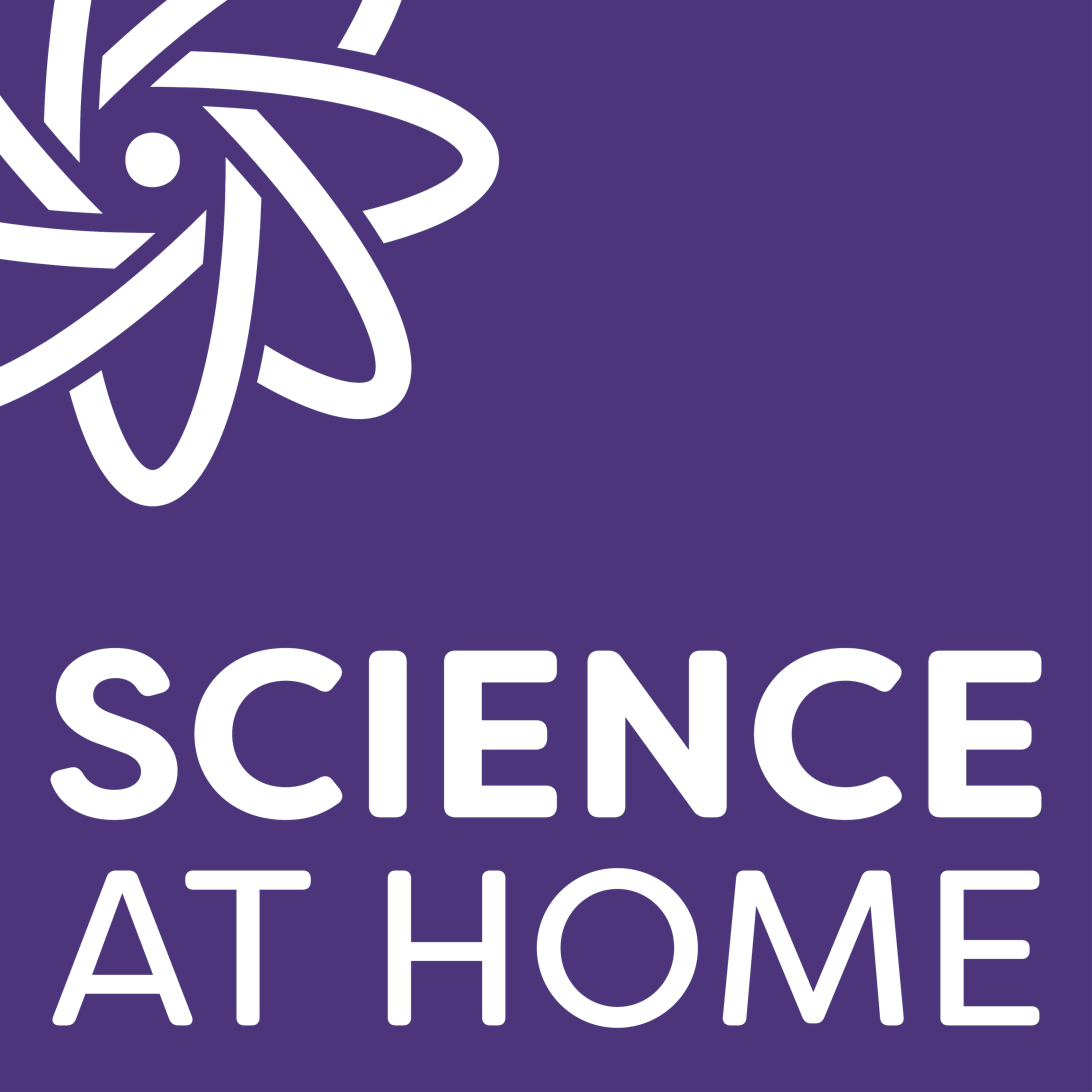
- Website type: Citizen science web portal
- Available in: English
- Website: www.scienceathome.org
- Commercial: No
- Current status: Offline

ScienceAtHome is a team of scientists, game developers, designers and visual artists based at Aarhus University, Denmark. ScienceAtHome does research on quantum physics, citizen science and gamification. ScienceAtHome also develops games that contribute to scientific research, and studies how humans interpret information to achieve results superior to some algorithmic approaches.

Most ScienceAtHome games are casual games and require no formal scientific training. Over 150,000 people have contributed to ScienceAtHome citizen science projects by playing games. Research games are also part of a much larger movement of creating serious games that go beyond mere entertainment.

The premise behind such games is that humans are better than computers at performing certain tasks, because of their intuition and superior visual processing. Video games are now being used to channel these abilities to solve problems in quantum physics.

== History ==
The idea of computer players solving quantum problems came to Jacob Sherson's mind while he was doing research at Johannes Gutenberg University, Mainz, in the group of Prof. Immanuel Bloch. The first form of ScienceAtHome was announced in 2012 based on the idea that computer game players could solve quantum problems. It was then called CODER – "Pilot Center for Community-driven Research: Game Assisted Quantum Computing". CODER later grew and evolved into ScienceAtHome with the first game born in 2012 called Quantum Moves.

ScienceAtHome is now part of the Center for Hybrid Intelligence situated at the Department of Management at Aarhus BSS.

== Publications ==
Jacob Sherson gave a speech at TEDxAarhus 2016 called "How to become a quantum physicist in five minutes".

Pinja Haikka, Postdoctoral Researcher in Theoretical Physics, also introduced ScienceAtHome at Women in Science event at Aarhus University, which was published on local television ITV OJ.

ScienceAtHome has been featured in a number of journals such as PNAS and Physical Review Research, and magazines like the Diplomatic Courier and Hosting Advice.

ScienceAtHome has also been featured in the Danish Broadcasting Corporation (DR).

In 2020, Jacob Sherson, ScienceAtHome, won Breakthrough of the Year at the World Science Summit for Breaking the Wall of Hybrid Intelligence.

== Projects ==
=== Games ===
Project	Type	Description	Platform	Link
Alice Challenge	Quantum Physics	The Alice Challenge is to find the optimal cooling process of an atom cloud—the end goal is to have the largest possible amount of cold atoms in a trap after several cooling sequences.	Not available to play	
Alien CODE	Social Science	In the Alien CODE, you need to find the right solution to the Alien puzzle. The solution which gives you a higher score will be the basis for subsequent moves, until you use the 'I'm feeling lucky' option.	Browser	
Quantum Minds	Cognitive Science, Quantum Physics	Quantum Minds studies the human learning process as a player encounters gamified quantum physics problems. The goal of Quantum Minds is to play through four levels of increasing difficulty. To unlock the next level, you must complete the current three times in a row.	Windows, OSX	
Quantum Moves 2	Quantum Physics	Quantum Moves is the first gamified citizen science project of ScienceAtHome. The mouse movements simulate laser beams used in the real quantum experiment to move atoms along optimal pathways.	Windows, OSX	
Skill Lab: Science Detective	Cognitive Science, Social Science	Skill Lab: Science Detective is a collection of mini-games that challenge players in various different ways. ScienceAtHome team tracks your performance across a variety of tasks and map your core gaming skills to better understand how this affects your performance in other games.	Browser, iOS, Android	
Network Game	Quantum physics, computer science (Demo)	The Network Game helps ScienceAtHome figure out how humans approach solving some of the most difficult computational problems.	Browser	
Tower Builder	Social Science	Tower Builder helps ScienceAtHome understand what constitutes a well-balanced team.	Browser	
Potential Penguin	Physics, Education	Potential Penguin helps ScienceAtHome find out how visualization helps in learning physics concepts and what improves the performance in other quantum games.	Browser	
Rydbergator	Physics, Education	Rydbergator is a game and a simulator where atoms are interacting.	Browser	
Turbulence	Physics, Education	Helps research in turbulence which is the chaotic changes in pressure and velocity.	Not available to play	
Crystal Crop Fever	Cognitive Science, Social Science	Research in human problem-solving behavior in an optimization task.	Browser, iOS, Android	
Corona Minister	Education	Understand the difficult decisions policymakers face during a pandemic in this simulation game.	Browser	
Lab Manager	Quantum Physics, Education	Lab Manager is a turn-based simulation game where you take the role of a researcher managing an atomic physics laboratory.	Browser	
crea.blender SDG	Creativity	Envision the future and create images with help from AI	Browser	
