= Citizen seismology =

Research approach in seismology

Citizen seismology is a citizen science research approach in seismology, where citizens are involved in scientific projects and work side by side with seismologists.

== Motivation ==
When an earthquake occurs, people affected by the event are the primary source of information about the felt shaking and the damages seen in the affected area. The information provided by citizens has a double value:

- it is used for sociological and risk management analysis, as to "how the population reacted to the event";
- it is used for seismological analysis, to gather testimonies on the visible effects of the earthquake.

Citizen seismology is therefore a collaboration between seismologists and non-scientists. Such a collaboration is made possible by the advancement of connection technologies (internet, social media, mobile applications).

== Background ==
Seismic networks were first developed in the 1960s. Since that, the observations of earthquake effects on a landscape or a city were key data to assess the earthquake parameters and characteristics. Lately, several initiatives have been promoted to increase the participation of amateur-seismologists into the scientific process of estimating the earthquake location, magnitude, and intensity.

The more citizens are informed of natural risks, the more they are resilient and able to face calamities. Hence, promoting public engagement into seismology, and science in general, increases earthquake risk awareness and preparation during a seismic crisis.

The United States Geological Survey (USGS) and the Euro-Mediterranean Seismological Centre (EMSC) are among the pioneers of Citizen Seismology. These institutes use social media and crowdsourcing to learn more about earthquakes, tsunamis, and landscapes.

== The Mayotte seismic swarm ==
An example of a citizen seismology project is what happened in Mayotte, a French island in the Indian Ocean. Starting 10 May 2018, a series of earthquakes has hit the island but scientific information and communication from the authorities was dramatically delayed, if not entirely missing. Therefore, the inhabitants turned social media into their primary information channel where they developed, on their own, a citizen seismology group composed of more than 10,000 people.
