= Citizen science =

Amateur scientific research

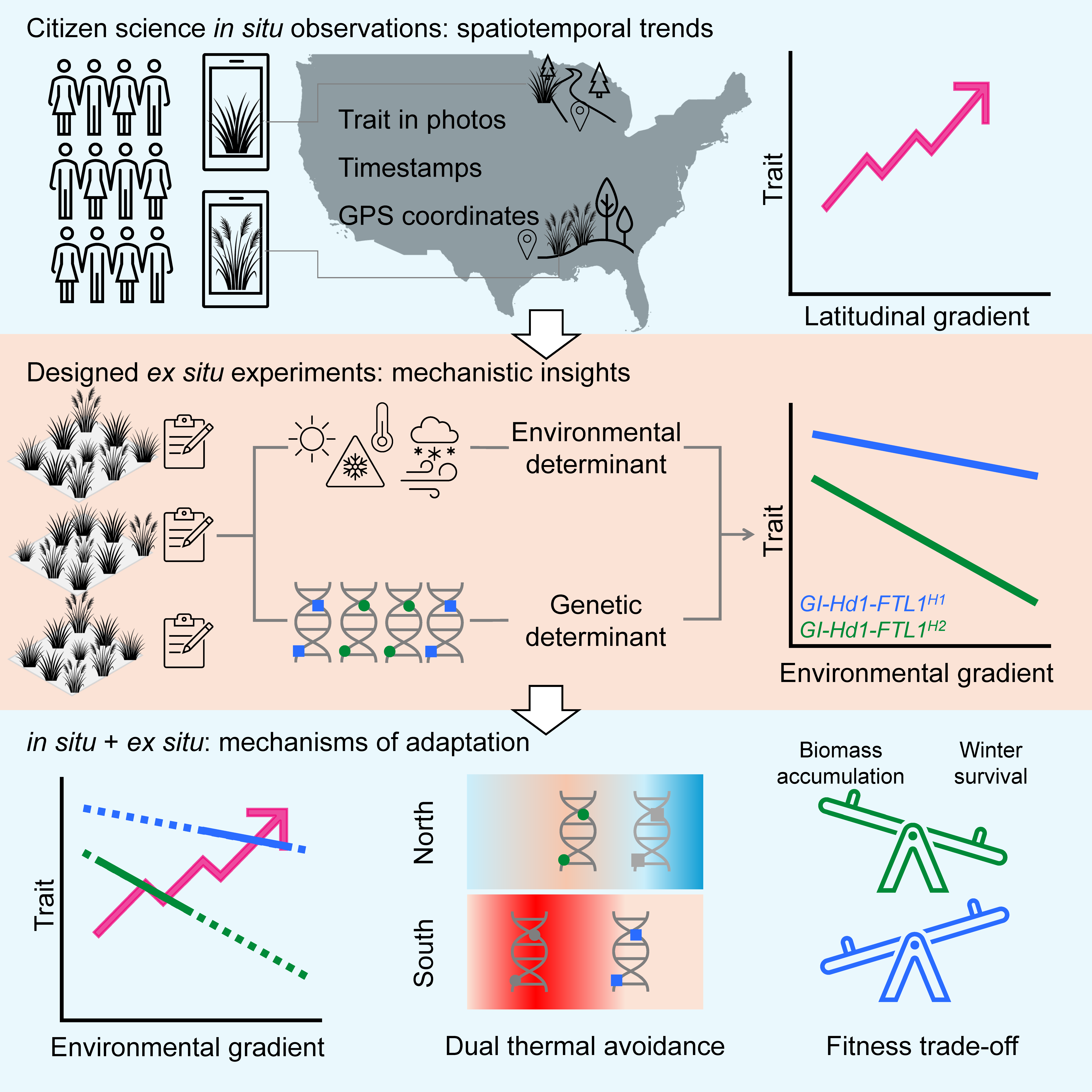
Citizen science can inspire scientific curiosity and help contextualize scientific discoveries by linking research findings to observations made in natural environments.

Citizen science (Note: Also known as community science, crowd science, crowd-sourced science, civic science, participatory monitoring, or volunteer monitoring.) is research conducted with the participation of the general public, amateur or nonprofessional researchers, or participants from the fields of science, social science, and many other disciplines. The exact definition of "citizen science" varies, with different individuals and organizations having their own specific interpretations of its scope. Citizen science is employed in a wide range of areas of study, including ecology, biology, conservation, health and medical research, astronomy, media and communications, and information science.

The applications and functions of citizen science in research projects are multifaceted. Citizen science can be used as a methodology in which public volunteers help in data collection and classification, thereby improving the scientific community's capacity. Citizen science observations can be used to uncover general trends in native habitats across broad spatial and temporal scales, extending data collection beyond the capacity of individual researchers. These observations can then be integrated with findings from designed experiments to provide a more complete understanding of natural variation and ecological processes. Citizen science can also involve more direct involvement from the public, with communities initiating projects researching environment and health hazards within their own communities. Participation in citizen science projects also educates the public about the scientific process and increases awareness about different topics. Some schools incorporate citizen science projects as part of their teaching curricula for this very purpose. More recently, libraries have also emerged as community hubs for citizen science.

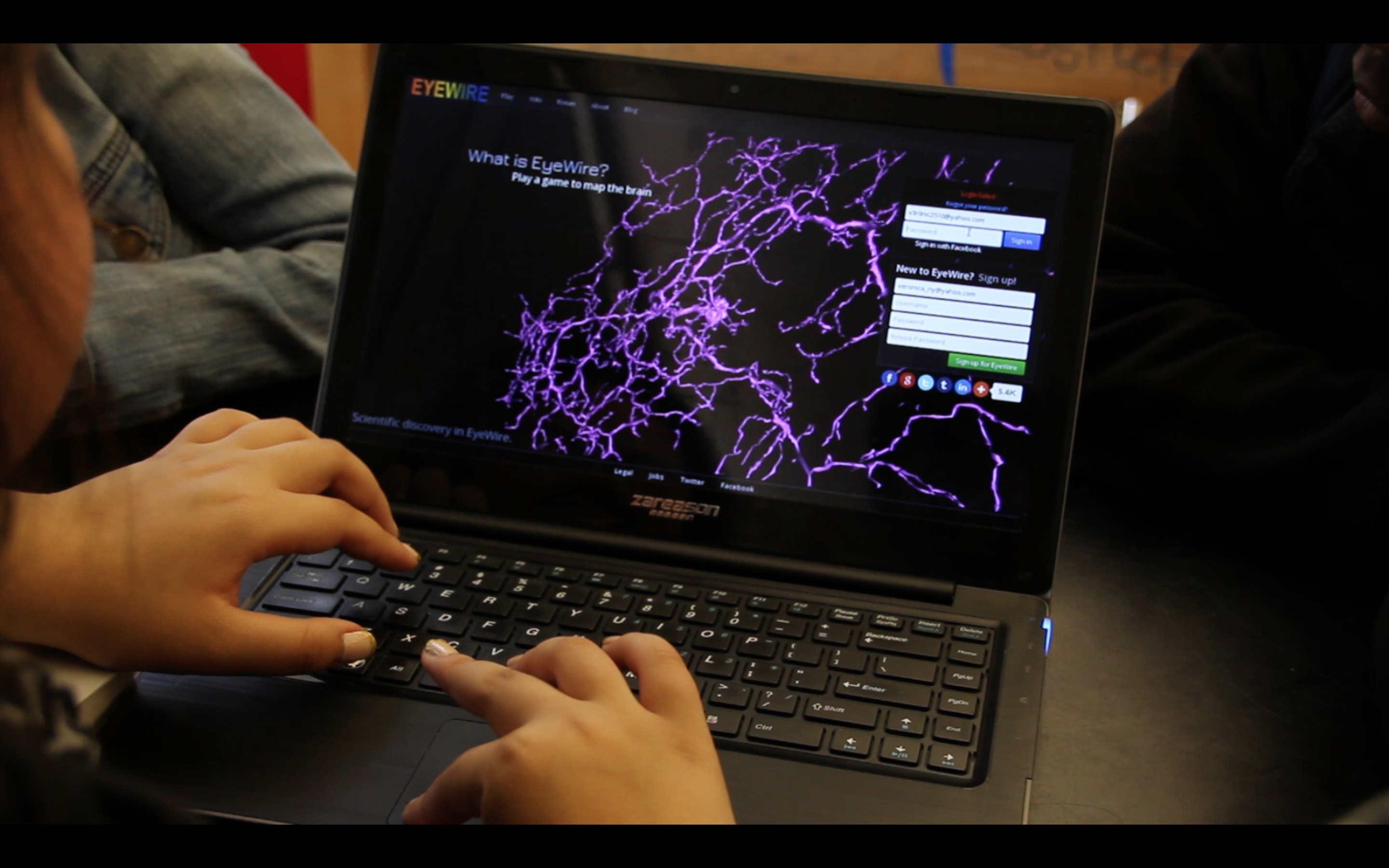
A high school student contributes to the citizen science project EyeWire as part of a neurology course.

== Background ==
The first use of the term "citizen science" appeared in a January 1989 issue of the MIT Technology Review, which featured three community-based labs studying environmental issues. In the 21st century, the number of citizen science projects, publications, and funding opportunities has increased. Citizen science has been used more over time, a trend helped by technological advancements. Digital citizen science platforms, such as Zooniverse and iNaturalist, store large amounts of data for many projects and are a place where volunteers can learn how to contribute to projects. For some projects, participants are instructed to collect and enter data, such as the species they observed, into large digital global databases. For other projects, participants help classify data on digital platforms. Citizen science data is also being used to develop machine learning algorithms. An example is using volunteer-classified images to train machine learning algorithms to identify species. While global participation and global databases are found on online platforms, the uniformity of data from contributors across different locations is not guaranteed. Concerns over potential data quality issues in citizen science projects, including measurement errors and biases, are recognized in the scientific community. However, statistical solutions and best practices are available to assist in addressing these concerns.

== Definition ==
The term "citizen science" has multiple origins, as well as differing concepts. "Citizen" is used in the general sense, as meaning in "citizen of the world", or the general public, rather than the legal term citizen of sovereign countries. It was first defined independently in the mid-1990s by Rick Bonney in the United States and Alan Irwin in the United Kingdom. Alan Irwin, a British sociologist, defines citizen science as "developing concepts of scientific citizenship which foregrounds the necessity of opening up science and science policy processes to the public". Irwin sought to reclaim two dimensions of the relationship between citizens and science: 1) that science should be responsive to citizens' concerns and needs; and 2) that citizens themselves could produce reliable scientific knowledge. The American ornithologist Rick Bonney, unaware of Irwin's work, defined citizen science as projects in which nonscientists, such as amateur birdwatchers, voluntarily contributed scientific data. This describes a more limited role for citizens in scientific research than Irwin's conception of the term.

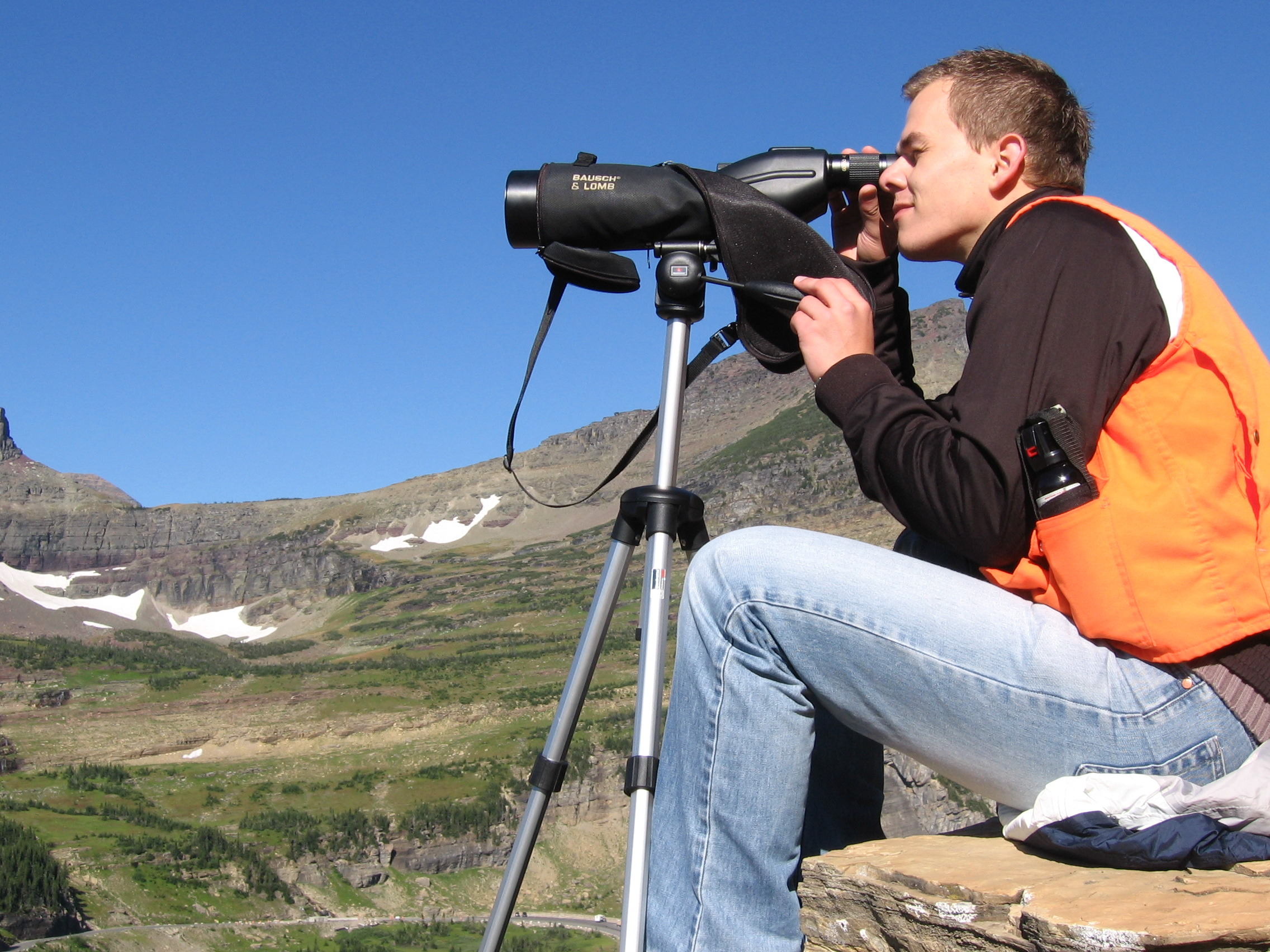
Scanning the cliffs near Logan Pass for mountain goats as part of the Glacier National Park Citizen Science Program

The terms citizen science and citizen scientists entered the Oxford English Dictionary (OED) in June 2014. "Citizen science" is defined as "scientific work undertaken by members of the general public, often in collaboration with or under the direction of professional scientists and scientific institutions". "Citizen scientist" is defined as: (a) "a scientist whose work is characterized by a sense of responsibility to serve the best interests of the wider community (now rare)"; or (b) "a member of the general public who engages in scientific work, often in collaboration with or under the direction of professional scientists and scientific institutions; an amateur scientist". The first use of the term "citizen scientist" can be found in the magazine New Scientist in an article about ufology from October 1979.

Muki Haklay cites, from a policy report for the Wilson Center entitled "Citizen Science and Policy: A European Perspective", an alternate first use of the term "citizen science" by R. Kerson in the magazine MIT Technology Review from January 1989. Quoting from the Wilson Center report: "The new form of engagement in science received the name 'citizen science'. The first recorded example of the use of the term is from 1989, describing how 225 volunteers across the US collected rain samples to assist the Audubon Society in an acid-rain awareness raising campaign."

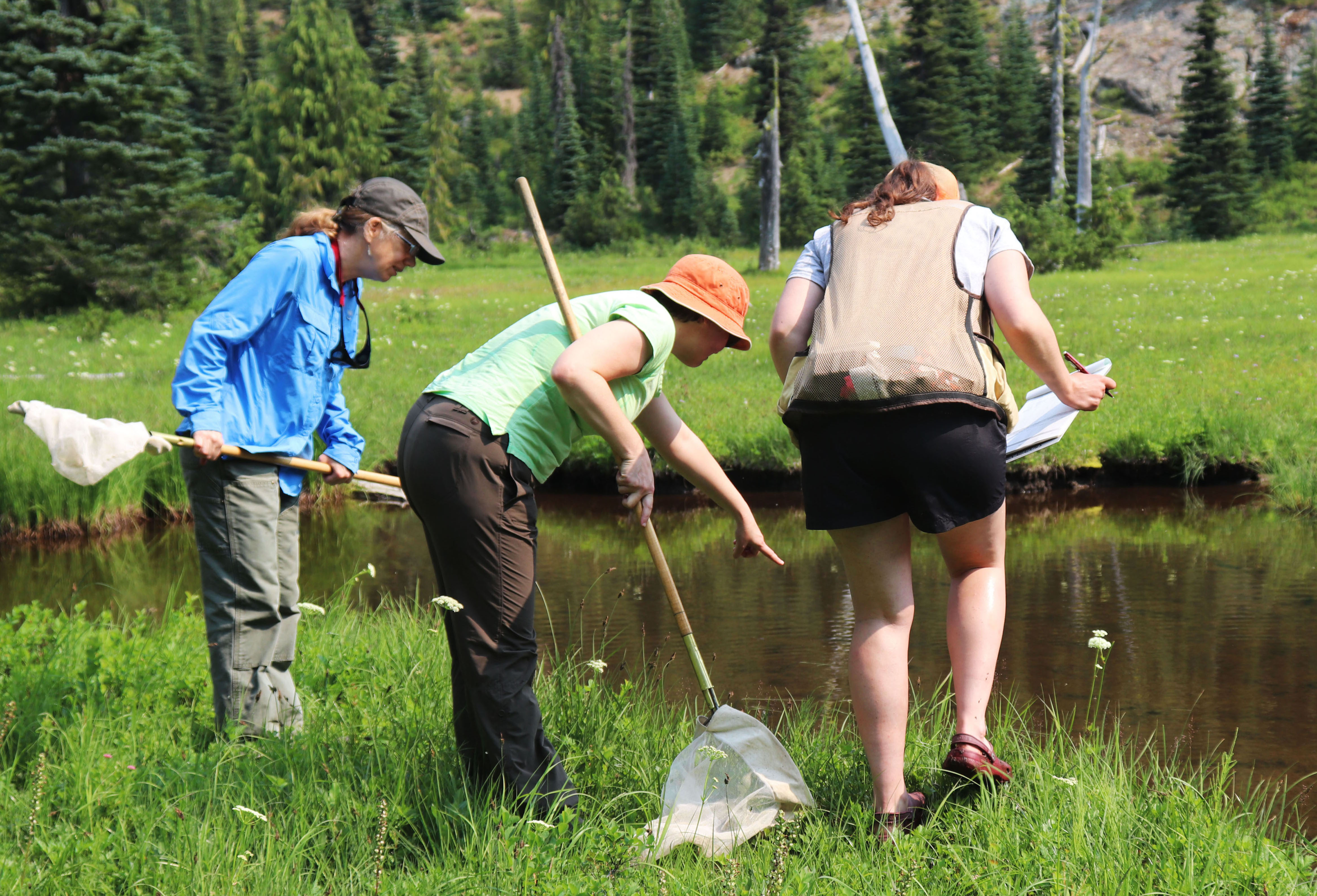
Citizen science volunteers and coordinator near a pond observe a frog

A Green Paper on Citizen Science was published in 2013 by the European Commission's Digital Science Unit and Socientize.eu, which included a definition for citizen science, referring to "the general public engagement in scientific research activities when citizens actively contribute to science either with their intellectual effort or surrounding knowledge or with their tools and resources. Participants provide experimental data and facilities for researchers, raise new questions and co-create a new scientific culture."

Citizen science may be performed by individuals, teams, or networks of volunteers. Citizen scientists often partner with professional scientists to achieve common goals. Large volunteer networks often allow scientists to accomplish tasks that would be too expensive or time-consuming to accomplish through other means.

Many citizen-science projects serve education and outreach goals. These projects may be designed for a formal classroom environment or an informal education environment such as museums.

Citizen science has evolved over the past four decades. Recent projects place more emphasis on scientifically sound practices and measurable goals for public education. Modern citizen science differs from its historical forms primarily in the access for, and subsequent scale of, public participation; technology is credited as one of the main drivers of the growth of citizen science activity.

In March 2015, the Office of Science and Technology Policy published a factsheet entitled "Empowering Students and Others through Citizen Science and Crowdsourcing". Quoting: "Citizen science and crowdsourcing projects are powerful tools for providing students with skills needed to excel in science, technology, engineering, and math (STEM). Volunteers in citizen science, for example, gain hands-on experience doing real science, and in many cases take that learning outside of the traditional classroom setting". The National Academies of Science cites SciStarter as a platform offering access to more than 2,700 citizen science projects and events, as well as helping interested parties access tools that facilitate project participation.

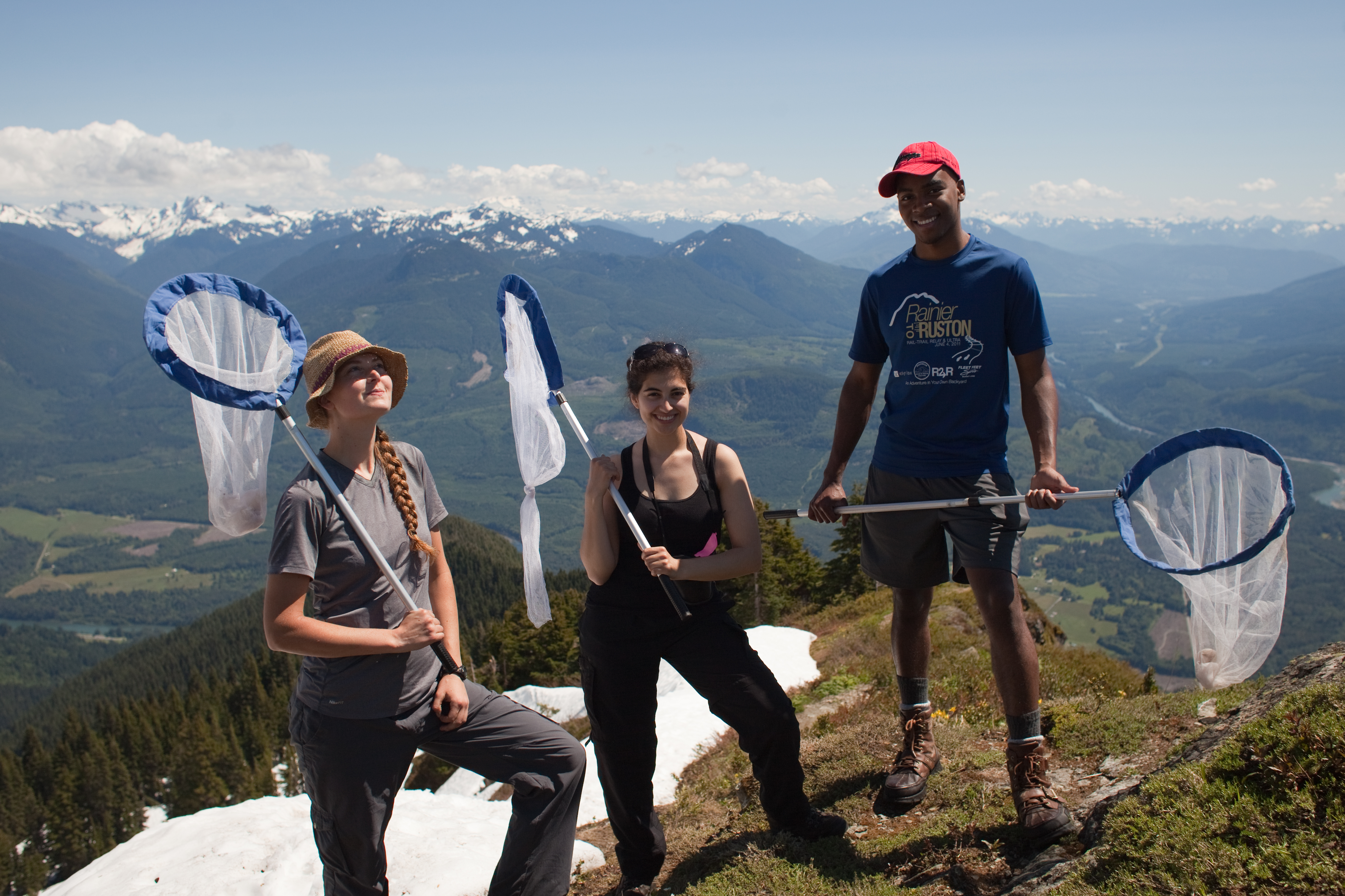
Members of the Cascades Butterfly Citizen Science Team pictured on Sauk mountain

In May 2016, a new open-access journal was started by the Citizen Science Association along with Ubiquity Press called Citizen Science: Theory and Practice (CS:T&P). Quoting from the editorial article titled "The Theory and Practice of Citizen Science: Launching a New Journal", "CS:T&P provides the space to enhance the quality and impact of citizen science efforts by deeply exploring the citizen science concept in all its forms and across disciplines. By examining, critiquing, and sharing findings across a variety of citizen science endeavors, we can dig into the underpinnings and assumptions of citizen science and critically analyze its practice and outcomes."

In February 2020, Timber Press, an imprint of Workman Publishing Company, published The Field Guide to Citizen Science as a practical guide for anyone interested in getting started with citizen science.

=== Alternative definitions ===
Other definitions for citizen science have also been proposed. For example, Bruce Lewenstein of Cornell University's Communication and S&TS departments describes three possible definitions:

- The participation of nonscientists in the process of gathering data according to specific scientific protocols and in the process of using and interpreting that data.
- The engagement of nonscientists in true decision-making about policy issues that have technical or scientific components.
- The engagement of research scientists in the democratic and policy process.

Scientists and scholars who have used other definitions include Frank N. von Hippel, Stephen Schneider, Neal Lane and Jon Beckwith. Other alternative terminologies proposed are "civic science" and "civic scientist".

Some researchers suggested terms for citizen science extending to other realms: citizen science projects enabling participants to become "agents of policy change", for example in climate policy, could be called citizen social science.

A 2014 Mashable article defines a citizen scientist as: "Anybody who voluntarily contributes his or her time and resources toward scientific research in partnership with professional scientists."

In 2016, the Australian Citizen Science Association released their definition, which states "Citizen science involves public participation and collaboration in scientific research with the aim to increase scientific knowledge."

In 2020, a group of birders in the Pacific Northwest of North America, eBird Northwest, has sought to rename "citizen science" to the use of "community science", "largely to avoid using the word 'citizen' when we want to be inclusive and welcoming to any birder or person who wants to learn more about bird watching, regardless of their citizen status."

=== Typologies of citizen science ===
Citizen science initiatives are commonly categorized according to the level of involvement of the citizen scientists. Towards the lower end of involvement, terms such as crowdsourcing or contributory citizen science describe that citizen scientists contribute observations, collect data or merely offer computing power or install sensors to measure environmental variables. Towards the higher end of involvement, "extreme citizen science" and co-creation are terms used to describe initiatives in which citizen scientists are involved in decisions influencing the goal and research methods or even lead research initiatives.

Overview table of classification of the involvement of citizen science
Tasks performed by citizen scientists	Typology after Haklay 2013	Typology after Senabre Hidalgo et al. 2022	Typology after Mahr and Dickel 2019	Typology after King et al. 2016
Defining research focus or leading research initiatives	Extreme citizen science	Co-creation and participatory approaches	Uninvited participation	By the people
Co-developing research questions and methods	Participatory science	Co-creation and participatory approaches	Invited participation	With the people
Collecting data or classifying information	Distributed intelligence	Contributory citizen science	Invited participation	For the people
Providing resources or installing sensors	Crowdsourcing	Contributory citizen science	Invited participation	For the people

=== Related fields ===
In a Smart City era, Citizen Science relies on various web-based tools, such as WebGIS, and becomes Cyber Citizen Science. Some projects, such as SETI@home, use the Internet to take advantage of distributed computing. These projects are generally passive. Computation tasks are performed by volunteers' computers and require little involvement beyond initial setup. There is disagreement as to whether these projects should be classified as citizen science.

The astrophysicist and Galaxy Zoo co-founder Kevin Schawinski stated: "We prefer to call this [Galaxy Zoo] citizen science because it's a better description of what you're doing; you're a regular citizen but you're doing science. Crowd sourcing sounds a bit like, well, you're just a member of the crowd and you're not; you're our collaborator. You're pro-actively involved in the process of science by participating."

Compared to SETI@home, "Galaxy Zoo volunteers do real work. They're not just passively running something on their computer and hoping that they'll be the first person to find aliens. They have a stake in science that comes out of it, which means that they are now interested in what we do with it, and what we find."

Citizen policy may be another result of citizen science initiatives. Bethany Brookshire (pen name SciCurious) writes: "If citizens are going to live with the benefits or potential consequences of science (as the vast majority of them will), it's incredibly important to make sure that they are not only well informed about changes and advances in science and technology, but that they also ... are able to ... influence the science policy decisions that could impact their lives." In "The Rightful Place of Science: Citizen Science", editors Darlene Cavalier and Eric Kennedy highlight emerging connections between citizen science, civic science, and participatory technology assessment.

==== Policy-making ====
Citizen science can extend to influencing policies and decision-making processes: Several international policy documents recognize the value of data contributed by citizen scientists. At the same time, most of these documents do not consider that citizen science can be a "tool for policy development".

== Benefits and limitations ==
The general public's involvement in scientific projects has become a means of encouraging curiosity and greater understanding of science while providing opportunities for collaboration between professional scientists and the general public. In a research report published by the U.S. National Park Service in 2008, Brett Amy Thelen and Rachel K. Thiet mention the following concerns, previously reported in the literature, about the validity of volunteer-generated data:

- Some projects may not be suitable for volunteers, for instance, when they use complex research methods or require a great deal of (often repetitive) work.
- If volunteers lack proper training in research and monitoring protocols, the data they collect might introduce bias into the dataset.

The question of data accuracy, in particular, remains open. John Losey, who created the Lost Ladybug citizen science project, has argued that the cost-effectiveness of citizen science data can outweigh data quality issues, if properly managed.

In December 2016, authors M. Kosmala, A. Wiggins, A. Swanson and B. Simmons published a study in the journal Frontiers in Ecology and the Environment called "Assessing Data Quality in Citizen Science". The abstract describes how ecological and environmental citizen science projects can contribute to scientific research. Citizen science projects can influence policy and guide resource management by producing datasets that are otherwise not feasible to generate. In the section "In a Nutshell" (pg3), four condensed conclusions are stated. They are:

1. Datasets produced by volunteer citizen scientists can have reliably high quality, on par with those produced by professionals.
2. Individual volunteer accuracy varies, depending on task difficulty and volunteer experience. Multiple methods exist for boosting accuracy to required levels for a given project.
3. Most types of bias found in CS datasets are also found in professionally produced datasets and can be accommodated using existing statistical tools.
4. Reviewers of CS projects should look for iterated project design, standardization and appropriateness of volunteer protocols and data analyses, capture of metadata, and accuracy assessment.

They conclude that as citizen science continues to grow and mature, a key metric of project success they expect to see will be a growing awareness of data quality. They also conclude that citizen science will emerge as a general tool helping "to collect otherwise unobtainable high-quality data in support of policy and resource management, conservation monitoring, and basic science."

A study of Canadian lepidoptera datasets published in 2018 compared the use of a professionally curated dataset of butterfly specimen records with four years of data from a citizen science program, eButterfly. The eButterfly dataset was used as it was determined to be of high quality because of the expert vetting process used on site, and there already existed a dataset covering the same geographic area consisting of specimen data, much of it institutional. The authors note that, in this case, citizen science data provides both novel and complementary information to the specimen data. Five new species were reported from the citizen science data, and geographic distribution information was improved for over 80% of species in the combined dataset when citizen science data was included.

Several recent studies have begun to explore the accuracy of citizen science projects and how to predict accuracy based on variables like expertise of practitioners. One example is a 2021 study by Edgar Santos-Fernandez and Kerrie Mengersen of the British Ecological Society, who utilized a case study which used recent R and Stan programming software to offer ratings of the accuracy of species identifications performed by citizen scientists in Serengeti National Park, Tanzania. This provided insight into possible problems with processes like this which include, "discriminatory power and guessing behaviour". The researchers determined that methods for rating the citizen scientists themselves based on skill level and expertise might make studies they conduct more easy to analyze.

Citizen science has been used in studies with simple data-collection procedures, particularly in the field of conservation biology and ecology. For example, in 2019, Sumner et al. compared the data of vespid wasp distributions collected by citizen scientists with the 4-decade, long-term dataset established by the BWARS. They set up the Big Wasp Survey from 26 August to 10 September 2017, inviting citizen scientists to trap wasps and send them for identification by experts where data was recorded. The results of this study showed that the campaign garnered over 2,000 citizen scientists participating in data collection, identifying over 6,600 wasps. This experiment provides strong evidence that citizen science can generate potentially high-quality data comparable to that of expert data collection, within a shorter time frame. Although the experiment was to originally test the strength of citizen science, the team also learned more about Vespidae biology and species distribution in the United Kingdom. With this study, the simple procedure enabled citizen science to be executed in a successful manner. A study by J. Cohn describes that volunteers can be trained to use equipment and process data, especially considering that a large proportion of citizen scientists are individuals who are already well-versed in the field of science.

The demographics of participants in citizen science projects are overwhelmingly White adults, of above-average income, having a university degree. Other groups of volunteers include conservationists, outdoor enthusiasts, and amateur scientists. As such, citizen scientists are generally individuals with a pre-understanding of the scientific method and how to conduct sensible and just scientific analysis. Some citizen science initiatives specifically work inclusively, investigating aspects of social inclusion and cohesion and conducted, for example, projects with hard of hearing young people.

== Ethics ==
Various studies have been published that explore the ethics of citizen science, including issues such as intellectual property and project design.(e.g.) The Citizen Science Association (CSA), based at the Cornell Lab of Ornithology, and the European Citizen Science Association (ECSA), based in the Museum für Naturkunde in Berlin, have working groups on ethics and principles.

In September 2015, ECSA published its Ten Principles of Citizen Science, which have been developed by the "Sharing best practice and building capacity" working group of ECSA, led by the Natural History Museum, London with input from many members of the association.

1. Citizen science projects actively involve citizens in scientific endeavour that generates new knowledge or understanding. Citizens may act as contributors, collaborators, or as project leader and have a meaningful role in the project.
2. Citizen science projects have a genuine science outcome. For example, answering a research question or informing conservation action, management decisions or environmental policy.
3. Both the professional scientists and the citizen scientists benefit from taking part. Benefits may include the publication of research outputs, learning opportunities, personal enjoyment, social benefits, satisfaction through contributing to scientific evidence e.g. to address local, national and international issues, and through that, the potential to influence policy.
4. Citizen scientists may, if they wish, participate in multiple stages of the scientific process. This may include developing the research question, designing the method, gathering and analysing data, and communicating the results.
5. Citizen scientists receive feedback from the project. For example, how their data are being used and what the research, policy or societal outcomes are.
6. Citizen science is considered a research approach like any other, with limitations and biases that should be considered and controlled for. However unlike traditional research approaches, citizen science provides opportunity for greater public engagement and democratisation of science.
7. Citizen science project data and meta-data are made publicly available and where possible, results are published in an open access format. Data sharing may occur during or after the project, unless there are security or privacy concerns that prevent this.
8. Citizen scientists are acknowledged in project results and publications.
9. Citizen science programmes are evaluated for their scientific output, data quality, participant experience and wider societal or policy impact.
10. The leaders of citizen science projects take into consideration legal and ethical issues surrounding copyright, intellectual property, data sharing agreements, confidentiality, attribution, and the environmental impact of any activities.

The medical ethics of internet crowdsourcing has been questioned by Graber & Graber in the Journal of Medical Ethics. In particular, they analyse the effect of games and the crowdsourcing project Foldit. They conclude: "games can have possible adverse effects, and that they manipulate the user into participation".

In March 2019, the online journal Citizen Science: Theory and Practice launched a collection of articles on the theme of Ethical Issues in Citizen Science. The articles are introduced with (quoting): "Citizen science can challenge existing ethical norms because it falls outside of customary methods of ensuring that research is conducted ethically. What ethical issues arise when engaging the public in research? How have these issues been addressed, and how should they be addressed in the future?"

In June 2019, East Asian Science, Technology and Society: An International Journal (EASTS) published an issue titled "Citizen Science: Practices and Problems" which contains 15 articles/studies on citizen science, including many relevant subjects of which ethics is one. Quoting from the introduction "Citizen, Science, and Citizen Science": "The term citizen science has become very popular among scholars as well as the general public, and, given its growing presence in East Asia, it is perhaps not a moment too soon to have a special issue of EASTS on the topic."

Use of citizen science volunteers as de facto unpaid laborers by some commercial ventures have been criticized as exploitative.

Ethics in citizen science in the health and welfare field, has been discussed in terms of protection versus participation. Public involvement researcher Kristin Liabo writes that health researcher might, in light of their ethics training, be inclined to exclude vulnerable individuals from participation, to protect them from harm. However, she argues these groups are already likely to be excluded from participation in other arenas, and that participation can be empowering and a possibility to gain life skills that these individuals need. Whether or not to become involved should be a decision these individuals should be involved in and not a researcher decision.

In July 2026, the study "10 recommendations for strengthening citizen science for improved societal and ecological outcomes: A co-produced analysis of challenges and opportunities in the 21st century" was published. The study "explores how citizen science can be improved by involving the public in all stages of scientific research" and concludes by arguing that "as the world confronts climate change, public health crises, and biodiversity loss, broader public involvement in science is key for equitable, efficient and evidence-informed responses."

1. Strengthen institutional and government support, and develop publicly led 'hubs'.
2. Improve partnerships with schools and educational institutions.
3. Improve communication about citizen science.
4. Improve citizen scientist support and recognition.
5. Improve transparency about methodology and processes.
6. Follow FAIR data principles.
7. Improve public involvement in all stages of research.
8. Expand training opportunities.
9. Encourage transparent and ethical research partnerships.
10. Improve consistency and terminology.

=== Data governance, privacy and sovereignty ===
As citizen science becomes increasingly influenced by digital platforms and sensors, governance questions go beyond research ethics to include data protection law and community control over reuse. Under the General Data Protection Regulation (GDPR), participatory projects that involve personal data can complicate the usual separation between professional researchers ("controllers") and participants ("data subjects"): citizen scientists may be considered joint controllers when they share or shape project purposes, which could expose volunteers to compliance responsibilities and create risks for both participant protections and project legitimacy. Practical guidance for citizen science therefore increasingly requires early planning for lawful data handling, clear allocation of responsibilities, and transparency about data flows across collection, storage, and sharing.

A second governance challenge concerns power asymmetries in open data. Because volunteers often produce data while institutions handle and publish it, decisions about openness, attribution, and access restrictions can include unequal priorities and certain vulnerabilities. Ethical open-data practice in citizen science is therefore frequently framed as a matter of data governance, not only technical quality. These concerns also extend to environmental monitoring where data may be politically sensitive (e.g., pollution exposure, land use, biodiversity decline).

Finally, monitoring initiatives have highlighted data sovereignty: the principle that indigenous peoples and local communities should govern collection, ownership, access and use of data connected to territories and cultural knowledge; so that digital monitoring does not reproduce colonialist tendencies between knowledge holders and external institutions. Related international policy discussions on open science explicitly point out that openness should not overrule privacy, equity, or indigenous rights over traditional knowledge.

== Economic worth ==
In the research paper "Can citizen science enhance public understanding of science?" by Bonney et al. 2016, statistics which analyse the economic worth of citizen science are used, drawn from two papers: i) Sauermann and Franzoni 2015, and ii) Theobald et al. 2015. In "Crowd science user contribution patterns and their implications" by Sauermann and Franzoni (2015), seven projects from the Zooniverse web portal are used to estimate the monetary value of the citizen science that had taken place. The seven projects are: Solar Stormwatch, Galaxy Zoo Supernovae, Galaxy Zoo Hubble, Moon Zoo, Old Weather, The Milky Way Project and Planet Hunters. Using data from 180 days in 2010, they find a total of 100,386 users participated, contributing 129,540 hours of unpaid work. Estimating at a rate of $12 an hour (an undergraduate research assistant's basic wage), the total contributions amount to $1,554,474, an average of $222,068 per project. The range over the seven projects was from $22,717 to $654,130.

In "Global change and local solutions: Tapping the unrealized potential of citizen science for biodiversity research" by Theobald et al. 2015, the authors surveyed 388 unique biodiversity-based projects. Quoting: "We estimate that between 1.36 million and 2.28 million people volunteer annually in the 388 projects we surveyed, though variation is great" and that "the range of in-kind contribution of the volunteerism in our 388 citizen science projects as between $667 million to $2.5 billion annually."

Worldwide participation in citizen science continues to grow. A list of the top five citizen science communities compiled by Marc Kuchner and Kristen Erickson in July 2018 shows a total of 3.75 million participants, although there is likely substantial overlap between the communities.

== Relations with education and academia ==
There have been studies published which examine the place of citizen science within education.(e.g.) Teaching aids can include books and activity or lesson plans.(e.g.). Some examples of studies are:

From the Second International Handbook of Science Education, a chapter entitled: "Citizen Science, Ecojustice, and Science Education: Rethinking an Education from Nowhere", by Mueller and Tippins (2011), acknowledges in the abstract that: "There is an emerging emphasis in science education on engaging youth in citizen science." The authors also ask: "whether citizen science goes further with respect to citizen development." The abstract ends by stating that the "chapter takes account of the ways educators will collaborate with members of the community to effectively guide decisions, which offers promise for sharing a responsibility for democratizing science with others."

From the journal Democracy and Education, an article entitled: "Lessons Learned from Citizen Science in the Classroom" by authors Gray, Nicosia and Jordan (GNJ; 2012) gives a response to a study by Mueller, Tippins and Bryan (MTB) called "The Future of Citizen Science". GNJ begins by stating in the abstract that "The Future of Citizen Science": "provides an important theoretical perspective about the future of democratized science and K12 education." But GRB state: "However, the authors (MTB) fail to adequately address the existing barriers and constraints to moving community-based science into the classroom." They end the abstract by arguing: "that the resource constraints of scientists, teachers, and students likely pose problems to moving true democratized science into the classroom."

In 2014, a study was published called "Citizen Science and Lifelong Learning" by R. Edwards in the journal Studies in the Education of Adults. Edwards begins by writing in the abstract that citizen science projects have expanded over recent years and engaged citizen scientists and professionals in diverse ways. He continues: "Yet there has been little educational exploration of such projects to date." He describes that "there has been limited exploration of the educational backgrounds of adult contributors to citizen science". Edwards explains that citizen science contributors are referred to as volunteers, citizens or as amateurs. He ends the abstract: "The article will explore the nature and significance of these different characterisations and also suggest possibilities for further research."

In the journal Microbiology and Biology Education a study was published by Shah and Martinez (2015) called "Current Approaches in Implementing Citizen Science in the Classroom". They begin by writing in the abstract that citizen science is a partnership between inexperienced amateurs and trained scientists. The authors continue: "With recent studies showing a weakening in scientific competency of American students, incorporating citizen science initiatives in the curriculum provides a means to address deficiencies". They argue that combining traditional and innovative methods can help provide a practical experience of science. The abstract ends: "Citizen science can be used to emphasize the recognition and use of systematic approaches to solve problems affecting the community."

In November 2017, authors Mitchell, Triska and Liberatore published a study in PLOS One titled "Benefits and Challenges of Incorporating Citizen Science into University Education". The authors begin by stating in the abstract that citizen scientists contribute data with the expectation that it will be used. It reports that citizen science has been used for first year university students as a means to experience research. They continue: "Surveys of more than 1500 students showed that their environmental engagement increased significantly after participating in data collection and data analysis." However, only a third of students agreed that data collected by citizen scientists was reliable. A positive outcome of this was that the students were more careful of their own research. The abstract ends: "If true for citizen scientists in general, enabling participants as well as scientists to analyse data could enhance data quality, and so address a key constraint of broad-scale citizen science programs."

Citizen science has also been described as challenging the "traditional hierarchies and structures of knowledge creation".

== History ==
While citizen science developed at the end of the 20th century, characteristics of citizen science are not new. Prior to the 20th century, science was often the pursuit of gentleman scientists, amateur or self-funded researchers such as Sir Isaac Newton, Benjamin Franklin, and Charles Darwin. Women citizen scientists from before the 20th century include Florence Nightingale who "perhaps better embodies the radical spirit of citizen science". Before the professionalization of science by the end of the 19th century, most pursued scientific projects as an activity rather than a profession itself, an example being amateur naturalists in the 18th and 19th centuries.

During the British colonization of North America, American Colonists recorded the weather, offering much of the information now used to estimate climate data and climate change during this time period. These people included John Campanius Holm, who recorded storms in the mid-1600s, as well as George Washington, Thomas Jefferson, and Benjamin Franklin who tracked weather patterns during America's founding. Their work focused on identifying patterns by amassing their data and that of their peers and predecessors, rather than specific professional knowledge in scientific fields. Some consider these individuals as the progenitors of the citizen scientist concept, while others ascribe this designation to prominent figures such as Leonardo da Vinci and Charles Darwin. However, there are also those who perceive citizen science as a distinct movement that developed later on, building on the preceding history of science.

However, by the mid-20th century, the scientific community was dominated by researchers employed by universities and government research laboratories. By the 1970s, this transformation was being called into question. Philosopher Paul Feyerabend called for a "democratization of science". Biochemist Erwin Chargaff advocated a return to science by nature-loving amateurs in the tradition of Descartes, Newton, Leibniz, Buffon, and Darwin. This approach would prioritize the contributions of "amateurship instead of money-biased technical bureaucrats".

A 2016 study indicates that the largest impact of citizen science is evident in research domains such as biology, conservation, and ecology. The primary utilization of citizen science is as a methodology for data collection and classification.

=== Amateur astronomy ===
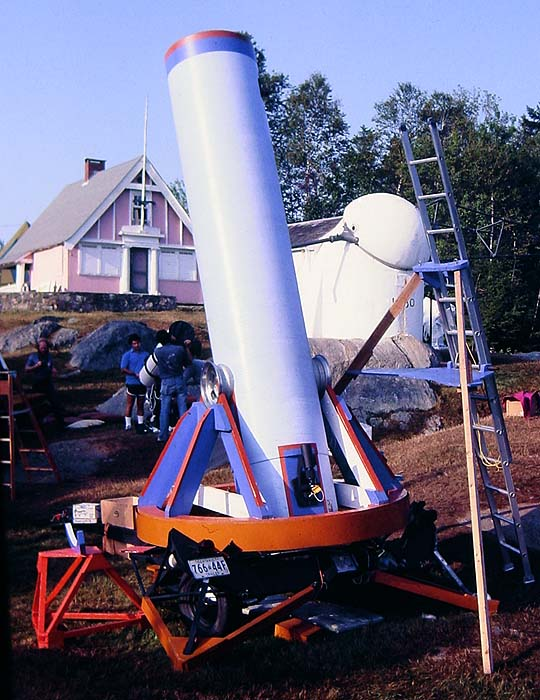
Amateur astronomers can build their own equipment and can hold star parties and gatherings, such as Stellafane.

Astronomy has long been a field where amateurs have contributed throughout time, all the way up to the present day.

Collectively, amateur astronomers observe a variety of celestial objects and phenomena sometimes with equipment that they build themselves. Common targets of amateur astronomers include the Moon, planets, stars, comets, meteor showers, and a variety of deep-sky objects such as star clusters, galaxies, and nebulae. Observations of comets and stars are also used to measure the local level of artificial skyglow. One branch of amateur astronomy, amateur astrophotography, involves the taking of photos of the night sky. Many amateurs like to specialize in the observation of particular objects, types of objects, or types of events that interest them.

The American Association of Variable Star Observers has gathered data on variable stars for educational and professional analysis since 1911 and promotes participation beyond its membership on its Citizen Sky website.

Project PoSSUM is a relatively new organization, started in March 2012, which trains citizen scientists of many ages to go on polar suborbital missions. On these missions, they study noctilucent clouds with remote sensing, which provides information about changes in the upper atmosphere and the ozone due to climate change.

=== Butterfly counts ===
Butterfly counts have a long tradition of involving individuals in the study of butterflies' range and their relative abundance. Two long-running programs are the UK Butterfly Monitoring Scheme (started in 1976) and the North American Butterfly Association's Butterfly Count Program (started in 1975). There are various protocols for monitoring butterflies and different organizations support one or more of transects, counts and/or opportunistic sightings. eButterfly is an example of a program designed to capture any of the three types of counts for observers in North America. Species-specific programs also exist, with monarchs the prominent example. Two examples of this involve the counting of monarch butterflies during the fall migration to overwintering sites in Mexico: (1) Monarch Watch is a continent-wide project, while (2) the Cape May Monarch Monitoring Project is an example of a local project.

=== Ornithology ===
Citizen science projects have become increasingly focused on providing benefits to scientific research. The North American Bird Phenology Program (historically called the Bird Migration and Distribution records) may have been the earliest collective effort of citizens collecting ornithological information in the U.S. The program, dating back to 1883, was started by Wells Woodbridge Cooke. Cooke established a network of observers around North America to collect bird migration records. The Audubon Society's Christmas Bird Count, which began in 1900, is another example of a long-standing tradition of citizen science which has persisted to the present day, now containing a collection of six million handwritten migration observer cards that date back to the 19th century. Participants input this data into an online database for analysis. Citizen scientists help gather data that will be analyzed by professional researchers, and can be used to produce bird population and biodiversity indicators.

Raptor migration research relies on the data collected by the hawkwatching community. This mostly volunteer group counts migrating accipiters, buteos, falcons, harriers, kites, eagles, osprey, vultures and other raptors at hawk sites throughout North America during the spring and fall seasons. The daily data is uploaded to hawkcount.org where it can be viewed by professional scientists and the public.

Other programs in North America include Project FeederWatch, which is affiliated with the Cornell Lab of Ornithology.

Such indices can be useful tools to inform management, resource allocation, policy and planning. For example, European breeding bird survey data provide input for the Farmland Bird Index, adopted by the European Union as a structural indicator of sustainable development. This provides a cost-effective alternative to government monitoring.

Similarly, data collected by citizen scientists as part of BirdLife Australia's has been analysed to produce the first-ever Australian Terrestrial Bird Indices.

In the UK, the Royal Society for the Protection of Birds collaborated with a children's TV show to create a national birdwatching day in 1979; the campaign has continued for over 40 years and in 2024, over 600,000 people counted almost 10 million birds during the Big Garden Birdwatch weekend.

Most recently, more programs have sprung up worldwide. One such program is NestWatch, a bird species monitoring program which tracks data on reproduction. They aim to conduct studies on when and how often nesting occurs, count eggs laid, successful hatches, and hatchling survival rates.

=== Citizen oceanography ===
The concept of citizen science has been extended to the ocean environment for characterizing ocean dynamics and tracking marine debris. For example, the mobile app Marine Debris Tracker is a joint partnership of National Oceanic and Atmospheric Administration and the University of Georgia. Long term sampling efforts such as the continuous plankton recorder has been fitted on ships of opportunity since 1931. Plankton collection by sailors and subsequent genetic analysis was pioneered in 2013 by Indigo V Expeditions as a way to better understand marine microbial structure and function.

=== Coral reefs ===
Citizen science in coral reef studies developed in the 21st century.

Underwater photography has become more popular since the development of moderate priced digital cameras with waterproof housings in the early 2000s, resulting on millions of pictures posted every year on various websites and social media. Underwater photographs taken by members of the public can supplement observations collected by professional researchers, who cannot spend so much time in the field.

As a consequence, several participative sciences programs have been developed, supported by geotagging and identification web sites such as iNaturalist. The Monitoring through many eyes project collates thousands of underwater images of the Great Barrier Reef and provides an interface for elicitation of reef health indicators.

The National Oceanic and Atmospheric Administration (NOAA) also offers opportunities for volunteer participation. By taking measurements in The United States' National Marine Sanctuaries, citizens contribute data to marine biology projects. In 2016, NOAA benefited from 137,000 hours of research.

There also exist protocols for auto-organization and self-teaching aimed at biodiversity-interested snorkelers, in order for them to turn their observations into sound scientific data, available for research. This kind of approach has been successfully used in Réunion island, allowing for tens of new records and even new species.

=== Freshwater fish ===
Aquarium hobbyists and their organizations contribute to fish conservation through species specific expertise, the discovery of new species, and the maintenance of databases containing ecological information on thousands of fish species, including catfish, Mexican freshwater fishes, killifishes, and cichlids. They also support conservation initiatives by breeding and maintaining endangered species and species extinct-in-the-wild for conservation projects. The CARES (Conservation, Awareness, Recognition, Encouragement, and Support) preservation program is an international hobbyist initiative that encourages aquarium enthusiasts to maintain threatened species and support their long term survival.

=== Amphibians ===
Citizen scientists also work to monitor and conserve amphibian populations. One recent project is FrogWatch USA, organized by the Association of Zoos and Aquariums. Participants are invited to educate themselves on their local wetlands and help to save amphibian populations by reporting the data on the calls of local frogs and toads. The project already has over 150,000 observations from more than 5000 contributors. Participants are trained by program coordinators to identify calls and utilize this training to report data they find between February and August of each "monitoring season". Data is used to monitor diversity, invasion, and long-term shifts in population health within these frog and toad communities.

=== Rocky reefs ===
Reef Life Survey is a marine life monitoring programme based in Hobart, Tasmania. The project uses recreational divers that have been trained to make fish and invertebrate counts, using an approximate 50 m constant depth transect of tropical and temperate reefs, which might include coral reefs. Reef Life Survey is international in its scope, but the data collectors are predominantly from Australia. The database is available to marine ecology researchers, and is used by several marine protected area managements in Australia, New Zealand, American Samoa and the eastern Pacific. Its results have also been included in the Australian Ocean DATA Network.

=== Agriculture ===
Farmer participation in experiments has a long tradition in agricultural science. There are many opportunities for citizen engagement in different parts of food systems. Citizen science is actively used for crop variety selection for climate adaptation, involving thousands of farmers. Citizen science has also played a role in furthering sustainable agriculture.

=== Art history ===
Citizen science has a long tradition in natural science. Today, citizen science projects can also be found in various fields of science like art history. For example, the Zooniverse project AnnoTate is a transcription tool developed to enable volunteers to read and transcribe the personal papers of British-born and émigré artists. The papers are drawn from the Tate Archive. Another example of citizen science in art history is ARTigo. ARTigo collects semantic data on artworks from the footprints left by players of games featuring artwork images. From these footprints, ARTigo automatically builds a semantic search engine for artworks.

=== Biodiversity ===
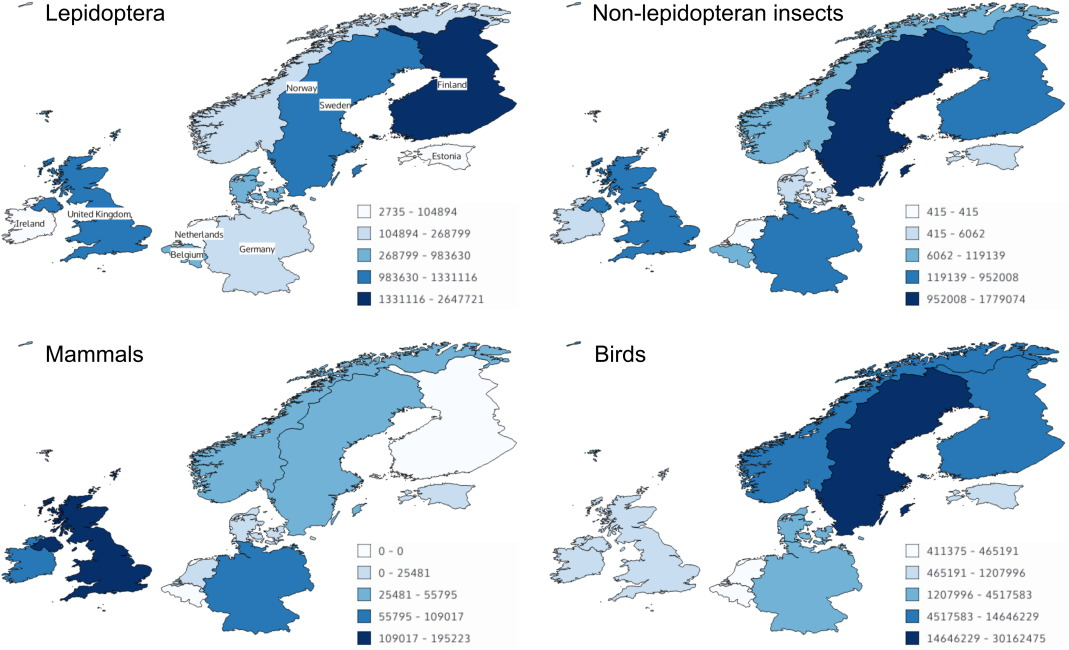
Distribution of citizen science data published to the Global Biodiversity Information Facility (GBIF) by taxa for countries in Northern Europe

Citizen science has made significant contributions to the analysis of biodiversity across the world. A majority of data collected has been focused primarily on species occurrence, abundance and phenology, with birds being primarily the most popular group observed. There is growing efforts to expand the use of citizen science across other fields. Past data on biodiversity has had limitations in the quantity of data to make any meaningful broad connections to losses in biodiversity. Participants contribute additional observations from locations where they work or spend time. For example, thousands of farmers reporting the changes in biodiversity in their farms over many years has provided a large amount of relevant data concerning the effect of different farming methods on biodiversity. Another example is WomSAT, a citizen science project that collects data on wombat roadkill and sarcoptic mange incidence and distribution, to support conservation efforts for the species. Citizen science can supplement other methods of biodiversity monitoring. The typical active method of species detection is able to collect data on the broad biodiversity of areas while citizen science approaches has shown to be more effective at identifying invasive species. In combination, this provides an effective strategy of monitoring the changes in biodiversity of ecosystems.

=== Health and welfare ===
In the research fields of health and welfare, citizen science is often discussed in other terms, such as "public involvement", "user engagement", or "community member involvement". However the meaning is similar to citizen science, with the exception that citizens are not often involved in collecting data but more often involved in prioritisation of research ideas and improving methodology, e.g. survey questions. In the last decades, researchers and funders have gained awareness of the benefits from involving citizens in the research work, but the involvement of citizens in a meaningful way is not a common practice. There is an ongoing discussion on how to evaluate citizen science in health and welfare research.

One aspect to consider in citizen science in health and welfare, that stands out compared to in other academic fields, is who to involve. When research concerns human experiences, representation of a group becomes important. While it is commonly acknowledged that the people involved need to have lived experience of the concerned topic, representation is still an issue, and researchers are debating whether this is a useful concept in citizen science.

Outside of the older patient and public involvement tradition, there are also efforts to bring the newer citizen science efforts to health and biomedical research. These efforts cover a broad spectrum of involvement and co-leadership of patients, including patient-led research, quantified self or personal science, as well as collaborative research efforts between researchers and patient-groups, often enabled by digital technology. A survey among European practitioners involved in health-related citizen science found that ethical challenges and achieving a balanced return on investment for patients and medical staff are common challenges.

== Modern technology ==
Newer technologies have increased the options for citizen science. Citizen scientists can build and operate their own instruments to gather data for their own experiments or as part of a larger project. Examples include amateur radio, amateur astronomy, Six Sigma Projects, and Maker activities. Scientist Joshua Pearce has advocated for the creation of open-source hardware based scientific equipment that both citizen scientists and professional scientists, which can be replicated by digital manufacturing techniques such as 3D printing. Multiple studies have shown this approach reduces scientific equipment costs. Examples of this approach include water testing, nitrate and other environmental testing, basic biology and optics. Groups such as Public Lab, which is a community where citizen scientists can learn how to investigate environmental concerns using inexpensive DIY techniques, embody this approach.

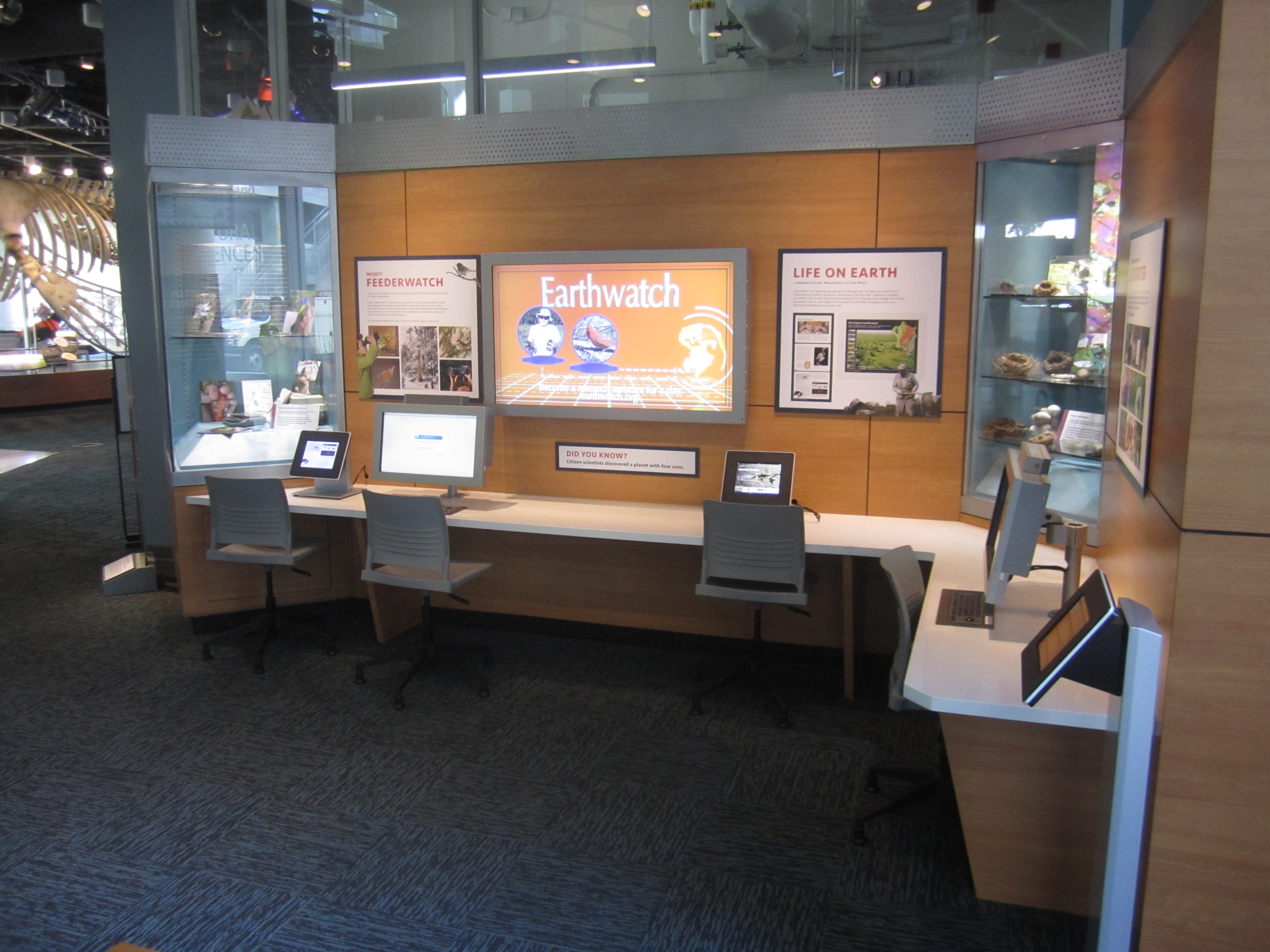
Citizen Science Center exhibit in the Nature Research Center wing of the North Carolina Museum of Natural Sciences

Video technology is much used in scientific research. The Citizen Science Center in the Nature Research Center wing of the North Carolina Museum of Natural Sciences has exhibits on how to get involved in scientific research and become a citizen scientist. For example, visitors can observe birdfeeders at the Prairie Ridge Ecostation satellite facility via live video feed and record which species they see.

Since 2005, the Genographic Project has used genetic technology to expand the knowledge of the anthropology, and its use of DNA testing to engage the public in the research effort has increased public involvement with science. Geno 2.0 expands the scope for citizen science, using participant contributions to study human population history. This includes supporting, organization and dissemination of personal DNA testing. Like amateur astronomy, citizen scientists encouraged by volunteer organizations like the International Society of Genetic Genealogy have provided information and research to the scientific community at large.

With unmanned aerial vehicles, further citizen science is enabled. One example is the ESA's AstroDrone smartphone app for gathering robotic data with the Parrot AR.Drone.

Citizens in Space (CIS), a project of the United States Rocket Academy, seeks to combine citizen science with citizen space exploration. CIS is training citizen astronauts to fly as payload operators on suborbital reusable spacecraft that are now in development. CIS will also be developing, and encouraging others to develop, citizen-science payloads to fly on suborbital vehicles. CIS has already acquired a contract for 10 flights on the Lynx suborbital vehicle, being developed by XCOR Aerospace, and plans to acquire additional flights on XCOR Lynx and other suborbital vehicles in the future.

CIS believes that "The development of low-cost reusable suborbital spacecraft will be the next great enabler, allowing citizens to participate in space exploration and space science."

The website CitizenScience.gov was started by the U.S. government to "accelerate the use of crowdsourcing and citizen science" in the United States. Following the internet's rapid increase of citizen science projects, this site is one of the most prominent resource banks for citizen scientists and government supporters alike. It features three sections: a catalog of existing citizen science projects which are federally supported, a toolkit to help federal officials as they develop and maintain their future projects, and several other resources and projects. This was created as the result of a mandate within the Crowdsourcing and Citizen Science Act of 2016 (15 USC 3724).

=== Internet ===
How gameplay helps ScienceAtHome build a quantum computer

The internet supports citizen science projects, including projects that use gamification. One of the first Internet-based citizen science experiments was NASA's Clickworkers, which enabled the general public to assist in the classification of images, greatly reducing the time to analyze large data sets. Another was the Citizen Science Toolbox, launched in 2003, of the Australian Coastal Collaborative Research Centre. Mozak is a game in which players create 3D reconstructions from images of actual human and mouse neurons, helping to advance understanding of the brain. One of the largest citizen science games is Eyewire, a brain-mapping puzzle game developed at the Massachusetts Institute of Technology that now has over 200,000 players. Another example is Quantum Moves, a game developed by the Center for Driven Community Research at Aarhus University, which uses online community efforts to solve quantum physics problems. The solutions found by players can then be used in the lab to feed computational algorithms used in building a scalable quantum computer.

More generally, Amazon's Mechanical Turk is frequently used in the creation, collection, and processing of data by paid citizens. There is controversy as to whether or not the data collected through such services is reliable, as it is subject to participants' desire for compensation. However, use of Mechanical Turk tends to quickly produce more diverse participant backgrounds, as well as comparably accurate data when compared to traditional collection methods.

The internet has also enabled citizen scientists to gather data to be analyzed by professional researchers. Citizen science networks are often involved in the observation of cyclic events of nature (phenology), such as effects of global warming on plant and animal life in different geographic areas, and in monitoring programs for natural-resource management. On BugGuide.Net, an online community of naturalists who share observations of arthropod, amateurs and professional researchers contribute to the analysis. By October 2022, BugGuide has over 1,886,513 images submitted by 47,732 contributors.

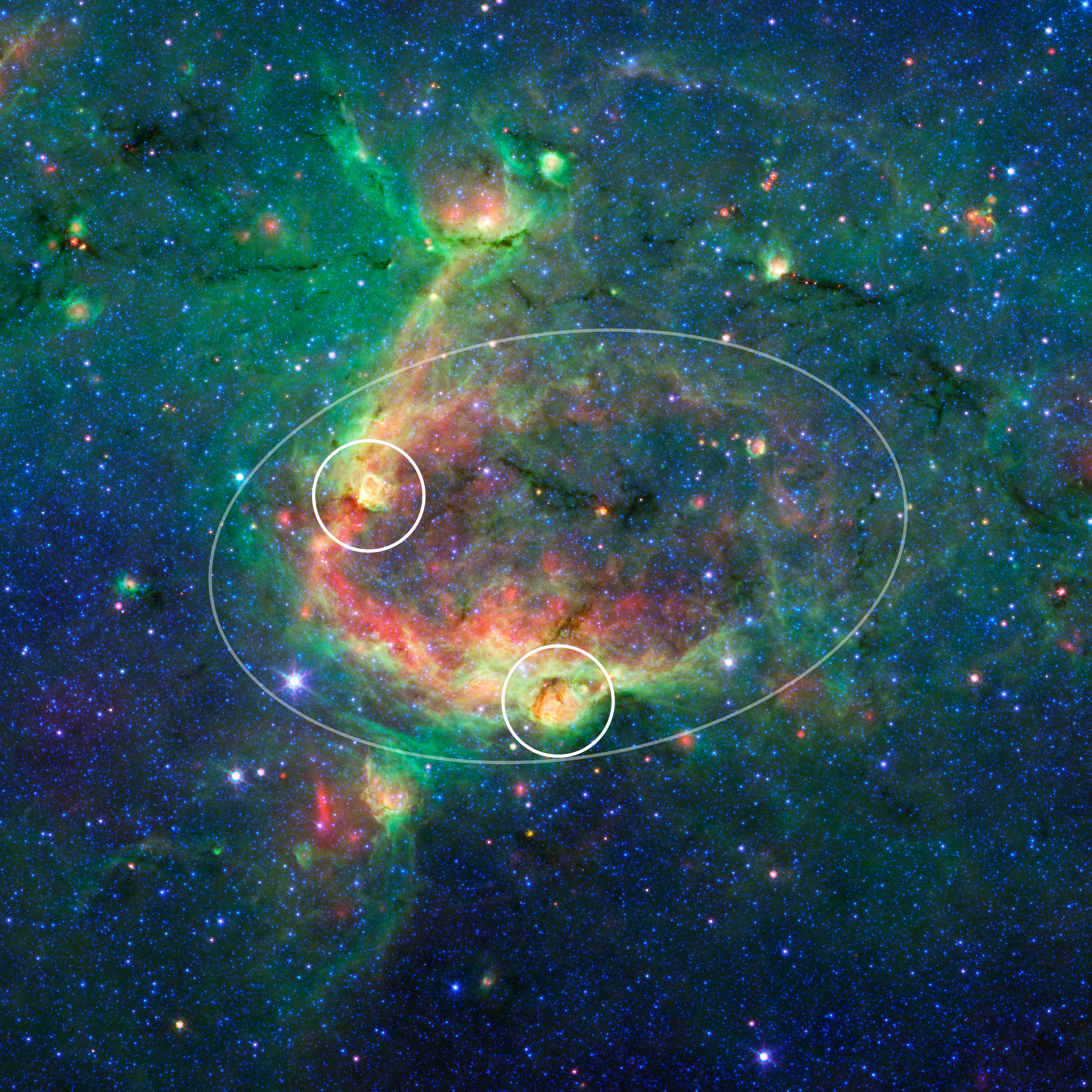
A NASA/JPL image from the Zooniverse's The Milky Way Project showing a hierarchical bubble structure

Not counting iNaturalist and eBird, the Zooniverse is home to the internet's largest, most popular and most successful citizen science projects. The Zooniverse and the suite of projects it contains is produced, maintained and developed by the Citizen Science Alliance (CSA). The member institutions of the CSA work with many academic and other partners around the world to produce projects that use the efforts and ability of volunteers to help scientists and researchers deal with the flood of data that confronts them. On 29 June 2015, the Zooniverse released a new software version with a project-building tool allowing any registered user to create a project. Project owners may optionally complete an approval process to have their projects listed on the Zooniverse site and promoted to the Zooniverse community. A NASA/JPL picture to the right gives an example from one of Zooniverse's projects The Milky Way Project.

The website CosmoQuest has as its goal "To create a community of people bent on together advancing our understanding of the universe; a community of people who are participating in doing science, who can explain why what they do matters, and what questions they are helping to answer."

CrowdCrafting enables its participants to create and run projects where volunteers help with image classification, transcription, geocoding and more. The platform is powered by PyBossa software, a free and open-source framework for crowdsourcing.

Project Soothe is a citizen science research project based at the University of Edinburgh. The aim of this research is to create a bank of soothing images, submitted by members of the public, which can be used to help others through psychotherapy and research in the future. Since 2015, Project Soothe has received over 600 soothing photographs from people in 23 countries. Anyone aged 12 years or over is eligible to participate in this research in two ways: (1) By submitting soothing photos that they have taken with a description of why the images make them feel soothed (2) By rating the photos that have been submitted by people worldwide for their soothability.

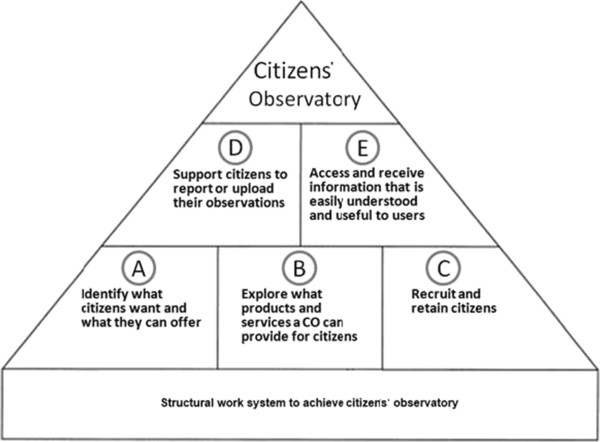
Sequential aspects of a Citizens' Observatory programme

The internet has allowed for many individuals to share and upload massive amounts of data. Using the internet citizen observatories have been designed as a platform to both increase citizen participation and knowledge of their surrounding environment by collecting whatever relevant data is focused by the program. The idea is supporting public participation in local data collection.

The invention of social media has aided in providing massive amounts of information from the public to create citizen science programs. In a case study by Andrea Liberatore, Erin Bowkett, Catriona J. MacLeod, Eric Spurr, and Nancy Longnecker, the New Zealand Garden Bird Survey is conducted as one such project with the aid of social media. It examines the influence of utilizing a Facebook group to collect data from citizen scientists as the researchers work on the project over the span of a year. The authors claim that this use of social media greatly helps with the efficiency of this study and makes the atmosphere feel more communal.

=== Smartphone ===
The bandwidth and ubiquity afforded by smartphones has vastly expanded the opportunities for citizen science. Examples include iNaturalist, Chronolog, the San Francisco project, Mosquito Alert, the WildLab, Project Noah, and Aurorasurus. Due to their ubiquity, for example, Twitter, Facebook, and smartphones have been useful for citizen scientists, having enabled them to discover and propagate a new type of aurora dubbed STEVE in 2016.

There are also apps for monitoring birds, marine wildlife and other organisms, and the "Loss of the Night". Chronolog, another citizen science initiative, uses smartphone photography to crowdsource environmental monitoring through timelapses. By positioning their cameras at designated photo stations and submitting images, participants contribute to long-term ecological records at parks and conservation sites across 48 U.S. states and 10 countries. Restoration professionals and other land stewards use this data to measure ecosystem health and understand the effectiveness of conservation interventions like habitat restoration, controlled burns, removal of invasive species, planting of native species, and efforts to improve water quality.

"The Crowd and the Cloud" is a four-part series broadcast during April 2017, which examines citizen science. It shows how smartphones, computers and mobile technology enable regular citizens to become part of a 21st-century way of doing science. The programs also demonstrate how citizen scientists help professional scientists to advance knowledge, which helps speed up new discoveries and innovations. The Crowd & The Cloud is based upon work supported by the U.S. National Science Foundation.

== Research disciplines ==
Citizen science has been applied to diverse research disciplines. The following examples are non-exhaustive.

=== Seismology ===
Since 1975, in order to improve earthquake detection and collect useful information, the European-Mediterranean Seismological Centre monitors the visits of earthquake eyewitnesses to its website and relies on Facebook and Twitter. More recently, they developed the LastQuake mobile application which notifies users about earthquakes occurring around the world, alerts people when earthquakes hit near them, gathers citizen seismologists' testimonies to estimate the felt ground shaking and possible damages.

=== Hydrology ===
Citizen science has been used to provide valuable data in hydrology (catchment science), notably flood risk, water quality, and water resource management. A growth in internet use and smartphone ownership has allowed users to collect and share real-time flood-risk information using, for example, social media and web-based forms. Although traditional data collection methods are well-established, citizen science is being used to fill the data gaps on a local level, and is therefore meaningful to individual communities. Data collected from citizen science can also compare well to professionally collected data. It has been demonstrated that citizen science is particularly advantageous during a flash flood because the public are more likely to witness these rarer hydrological events than scientists.

=== Plastics and pollution ===
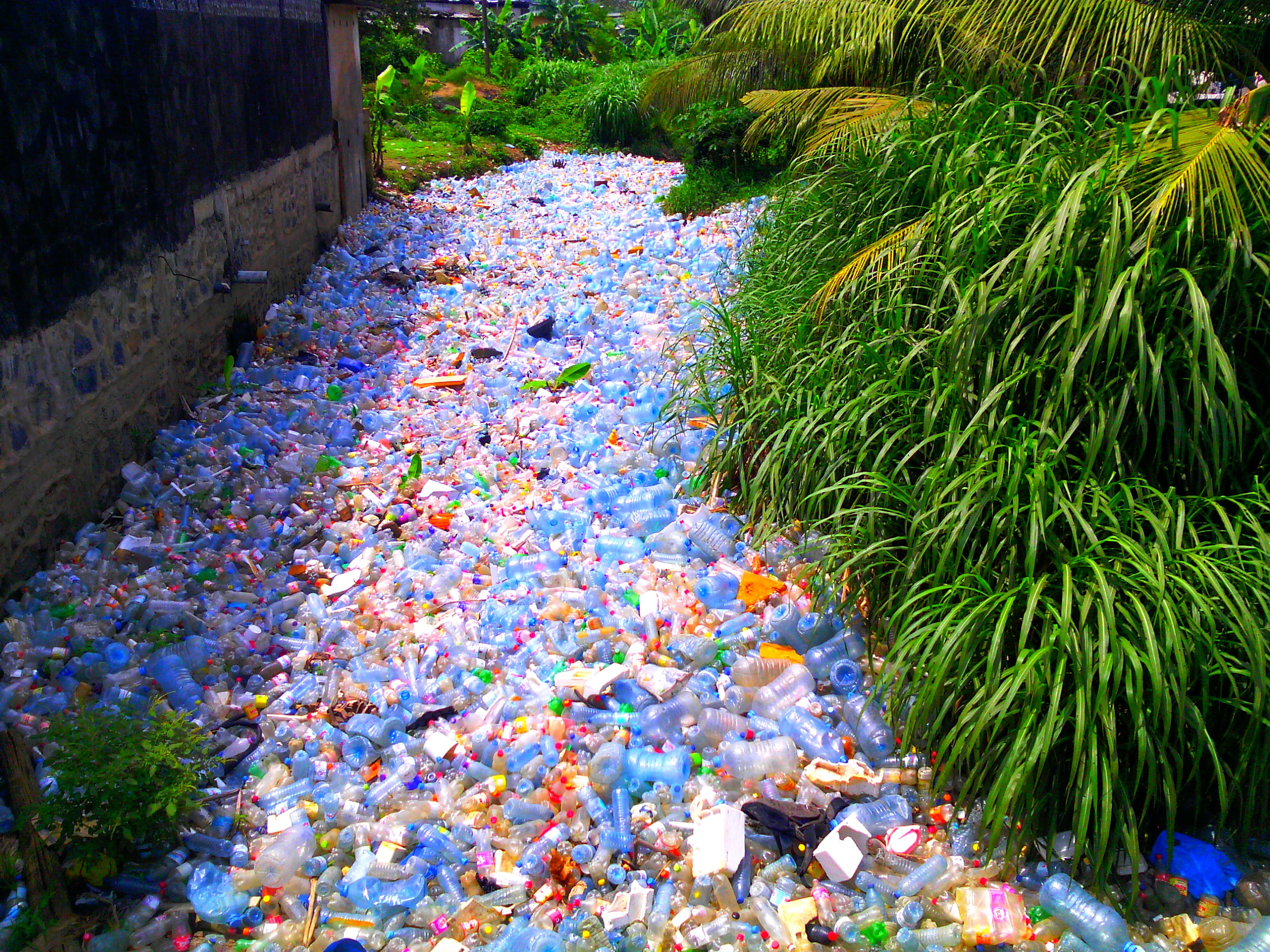
Plastic pollution in Madagascar

Citizen science includes projects that help monitor plastics and their associated pollution. These include The Ocean Cleanup, #OneLess, The Big Microplastic Survey, EXXpedition and Alliance to End Plastic Waste. Ellipsis seeks to map the distribution of litter using aerial data mapping by unmanned aerial vehicles and machine learning software. A Zooniverse project called The Plastic Tide (now finished) helped train an algorithm used by Ellipsis.

In most studies citizen scientists are involved in the collection of data or samples, whereas analysis of data or the processing of samples is usually left to professional scientists. For microplastics, costly equipment and labor-intensive analysis of samples create a bottleneck, therefore some researchers have developed alternative methods to verify plastic polymers that can be used by citizen scientists (such as melting particles).

Citizen science studies of plastic pollution have also extended beyond assessing litter quantities in the environment and survey: the non-governmental organization #BreakFreeFromPlastic has coordinated supermarket audits, assessing them for features avoid plastic pollution such as systems to deposit return bottles or the presence of fresh food counters. They have involved "hundreds of volunteers" in 27 countries.

Examples of relevant articles (by date):

- Citizen Science Promotes Environmental Engagement: (quote) "Citizen science projects are rapidly gaining popularity among the public, in which volunteers help gather data on species that can be used by scientists in research. And it's not just adults who are involved in these projects – even kids have collected high-quality data in the US."
- Tackling Microplastics on Our Own: (quote) "Plastics, ranging from the circles of soda can rings to microbeads the size of pinheads, are starting to replace images of sewage for a leading cause of pollution – especially in the ocean". Further, "With recent backing from the Crowdsourcing and Citizen Science Act, citizen science is increasingly embraced as a tool by US Federal agencies."
- Citizen Scientists Are Tracking Plastic Pollution Worldwide: (quote) "Scientists who are monitoring the spread of tiny pieces of plastic throughout the environment are getting help from a small army of citizen volunteers – and they're finding bits of polymer in some of the most remote parts of North America."
- Artificial intelligence and citizen scientists: Powering the clean-up of Asia Pacific's beaches:(quote) "The main objective is to support citizen scientists cleaning up New Zealand beaches and get a better understanding of why litter is turning up, so preventive and proactive action can be taken."
- Citizen science could help address Canada's plastic pollution problem: (quote) "But citizen engagement and participation in science goes beyond beach cleanups, and can be used as a tool to bridge gaps between communities and scientists. These partnerships between scientists and citizen scientists have produced real world data that have influenced policy changes."

Examples of relevant scientific studies or books include (by date):

- Distribution and abundance of small plastic debris on beaches in the SE Pacific (Chile): a study supported by a citizen science project: (quote) "The citizen science project 'National Sampling of Small Plastic Debris' was supported by schoolchildren from all over Chile who documented the distribution and abundance of small plastic debris on Chilean beaches. Thirty-nine schools and nearly 1,000 students from continental Chile and Easter Island participated in the activity."
- Incorporating citizen science to study plastics in the environment: (quote) "Taking advantage of public interest in the impact of plastic on the marine environment, successful Citizen Science (CS) programs incorporate members of the public to provide repeated sampling for time series as well as synoptic collections over wide geographic regions."
- Marine anthropogenic litter on British beaches: A 10-year nationwide assessment using citizen science data: (quote) "Citizen science projects, whereby members of the public gather information, offer a low-cost method of collecting large volumes of data with considerable temporal and spatial coverage. Furthermore, such projects raise awareness of environmental issues and can lead to positive changes in behaviours and attitudes."
- Determining Global Distribution of Microplastics by Combining Citizen Science and In-Depth Case Studies: (quote) "Our first project involves the general public through citizen science. Participants collect sand samples from beaches using a basic protocol, and we subsequently extract and quantify microplastics in a central laboratory using the standard operating procedure."
- Risk Perception of Plastic Pollution: Importance of Stakeholder Involvement and Citizen Science: (quote) "The chapter finally discusses how risk perception can be improved by greater stakeholder involvement and utilization of citizen science and thereby improve the foundation for timely and efficient societal measures."
- Assessing the citizen science approach as tool to increase awareness on the marine litter problem: (quote) "This paper provides a quantitative assessment of students' attitude and behaviors towards marine litter before and after their participation to SEACleaner, an educational and citizen science project devoted to monitor macro- and micro-litter in an Area belonging to Pelagos Sanctuary."
- Spatial trends and drivers of marine debris accumulation on shorelines in South Eleuthera, The Bahamas using citizen science: (quote) "This study measured spatial distribution of marine debris stranded on beaches in South Eleuthera, The Bahamas. Citizen science, fetch modeling, relative exposure index and predictive mapping were used to determine marine debris source and abundance."
- Making citizen science count: Best practices and challenges of citizen science projects on plastics in aquatic environments: (quote) "Citizen science is a cost-effective way to gather data over a large geographical range while simultaneously raising public awareness on the problem".
- White and wonderful? Microplastics prevail in snow from the Alps to the Arctic: (quote) "In March 2018, five samples were taken at different locations on Svalbard (Fig. 1A and Table 1) by citizen scientists embarking on a land expedition by ski-doo (Aemalire project). The citizens were instructed on contamination prevention and equipped with protocol forms, prerinsed 2-liter stainless steel containers (Ecotanca), a porcelain mug, a steel spoon, and a soup ladle for sampling."

=== Citizen sensing ===
Citizen sensing can be a form of citizen science: (quote) "The work of citizen sensing, as a form of citizen science, then further transforms Stengers's notion of the work of science by moving the experimental facts and collectives where scientific work is undertaken out of the laboratory of experts and into the world of citizens." Similar sensing activities include Crowdsensing and participatory monitoring. While the idea of using mobile technology to aid this sensing is not new, creating devices and systems that can be used to aid regulation has not been straightforward. Some examples of projects that include citizen sensing are:

- Citizen Sense (2013–2018): (quote) "Practices of monitoring and sensing environments have migrated to everyday participatory applications, where users of smart phones and networked devices are able to engage with modes of environmental observation and data collection."
- Breathe Project: (quote) "We use the best available science and technology to better understand the quality of the air we breathe and provide opportunities for citizens to engage and take action."
- The Bristol Approach to Citizen Sensing: (quote) "Citizen Sensing is about empowering people and places to understand and use smart tech and data from sensors to tackle the issues they care about, connect with other people who can help, and take positive, practical action."
- Luftdaten.info: (quote) "You and thousands of others around the world install self-built sensors on the outside their home. Luftdaten.info generates a continuously updated particular matter map from the transmitted data."
- CitiSense: (quote) "CitiSense aims to co-develop a participatory risk management system (PRMS) with citizens, local authorities and organizations which enables them to contribute to advanced climate services and enhanced urban climate resilience as well as receive recommendations that support their security."

A group of citizen scientists in a community-led project targeting toxic smoke from wood burners in Bristol, has recorded 11 breaches of World Health Organization daily guidelines for ultra-fine particulate pollution over a period of six months.

In a £7M programme funded by water regulator Ofwat, citizen scientists are being trained to test for pollution and over-abstraction in 10 river catchment areas in the UK. Sensors will be used and the information gathered will be available in a central visualisation platform. The project is led by The Rivers Trust and United Utilities and includes volunteers such as anglers testing the rivers they use. The Angling Trust provides the pollution sensors, with Kristian Kent from the Trust saying: "Citizen science is a reality of the world in the future, so they're not going to be able to just sweep it under the carpet."

River water quality in the U.K. has been tested by a combined total of over 7,000 volunteers in so-called "blitzes" run over two weekends in 2024. The research by the NGO Earthwatch Europe gathered data from 4,000 freshwater sites and used standardised testing equipment provide by the NGO and Imperial College. The second blitz in October 2024 included testing for chemical pollutants, such as antibiotics, agricultural chemicals and pesticides. Results from 4,531 volunteers showed that over 61% of the freshwater sites "were in a poor state because of high levels of the nutrients phosphate and nitrate, the main source of which is sewage effluent and agricultural runoff". The data gathered through robust volunteer testing is analysed and put into a report helping provide the Environment Agency with information it does not have.

=== COVID-19 pandemic ===
Resources for computer science and scientific crowdsourcing projects concerning COVID-19 can be found on the internet or as apps. Some such projects are listed below:

- The distributed computing project Folding@home launched a program in March 2020 to assist researchers around the world who were working on finding a cure and learning more about the coronavirus pandemic. The initial wave of projects were meant to simulate potentially druggable protein targets from SARS-CoV-2 (and also its predecessor and close relation SARS-CoV, about which there is significantly more data available). In 2024, the project has been extended to look at other health issues including Alzheimer's and cancer. The project asks volunteers to download the app and donate computing power for simulations.
- The distributed computing project Rosetta@home also joined the effort in March 2020. The project uses computers of volunteers to model SARS-CoV-2 virus proteins to discover possible drug targets or create new proteins to neutralize the virus. Researchers revealed that with the help of Rosetta@home, they had been able to "accurately predict the atomic-scale structure of an important coronavirus protein weeks before it could be measured in the lab." In 2022, the parent Boinc company thanked contributors for donating their computer power and helping work on the de novo protein design including vaccine development.
- The OpenPandemics – COVID-19 project is a partnership between Scripps Research and IBM's World Community Grid for a distributed computing project that "will automatically run a simulated experiment in the background [of connected home PCs] which will help predict the effectiveness of a particular chemical compound as a possible treatment for COVID-19". The project asked volunteers to donate unused computing power. In 2024, the project was looking at targeting the DNA polymerase of the cytomegalovirus to identify binders.
- The Eterna OpenVaccine project enables video game players to "design an mRNA encoding a potential vaccine against the novel coronavirus." In mid-2021, it was noted that the project had helped create a library of potential vaccine molecules to be tested at Stanford University; SU researchers also noted that importance of volunteers discussing the games and exchanging ideas.
- In March 2020, the EU-Citizen.Science project had "a selection of resources related to the current COVID19 pandemic. It contains links to citizen science and crowdsourcing projects"
- The COVID-19 Citizen Science project was "a new initiative by University of California, San Francisco physician-scientists" that "will allow anyone in the world age 18 or over to become a citizen scientist advancing understanding of the disease." By 2024, the Eureka platform had over 100,000 participants.
- The CoronaReport digital journalism project was "a citizen science project which democratizes the reporting on the Coronavirus, and makes these reports accessible to other citizens." It was developed by the University of Edinburgh and asked people affected by Covid to share the social effects of the pandemic.
- The COVID Symptom Tracker was a crowdsourced study of the symptoms of the virus. It was created in the UK by King's College London and Guy's and St Thomas' Hospitals. It had two million downloads by April 2020. Within three months, information from the app had helped identify six variations of Covid. Government funding ended in early 2022, but due to the large number of volunteers, Zoe decided to continue the work to study general health. By February 2023, over 75,000 people had downloaded the renamed Zoe Habit Tracker.
- The Covid Near You epidemiology tool "uses crowdsourced data to visualize maps to help citizens and public health agencies identify current and potential hotspots for the recent pandemic coronavirus, COVID-19." The site was launched in Boston in March 2020; at the end of 2020 it was rebranded to Outbreaks Near Me and tracked both Covid and flu.
- The We-Care project is a novel initiative by University of California, Davis researchers that uses anonymity and crowdsourced information to alert infected users and slow the spread of COVID-19.
- COVID Radar was an app in the Netherlands, active between April 2020 and February 2022, with which users anonymously answered a short daily questionnaire asking about their symptoms, behavior, coronavirus test results, and vaccination status. Symptoms and behavior were visualized on a map and users received feedback on their individual risk and behaviors relative to the national mean. The app had over 250,000 users, who filled out the questionnaire over 8.5 million times. Research from this app continued to be used in 2024.
- The Quantified Flu project is a co-designed citizen science effort for tracking symptoms and correlating them with physiological data from wearable devices that was launched in April 2020 and is still ongoing.

For coronavirus studies and information that can help enable citizen science, many online resources are available through open access and open science websites, including an intensive care medicine e-book chapter hosted by EMCrit and portals run by the Cambridge University Press, the Europe branch of the Scholarly Publishing and Academic Resources Coalition, The Lancet, John Wiley and Sons, and Springer Nature.

There have been suggestions that the pandemic and subsequent lockdown has boosted the public's awareness and interest in citizen science, with more people around the world having the motivation and the time to become involved in helping to investigate the illness and potentially move on to other areas of research.

== Around the world ==
=== Global ===
The Citizen Science Global Partnership was created in 2022. the partnership understands itself as a network-of-networks and brings together citizen science networks from Australia, Africa, Asia, Europe, South America and the USA. It pursues different projects, for example relating to climate change and air quality and pursues to connect different communities, for example the open science and citizen science community. It has also released a charter to recognize citizen science in multilateral environmental agreements and decision-making processes.

=== Africa ===
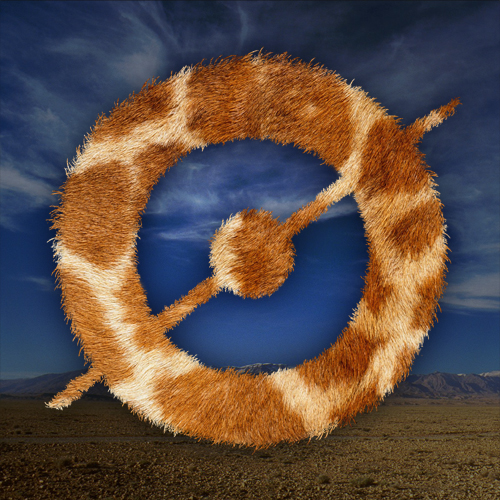
Snapshot Serengeti classifies animals at the Serengeti National Park in Tanzania.

- In South Africa (SA), citizen science projects include: the Stream Assessment Scoring System (miniSASS) which "encourages enhanced catchment management for water security in a climate stressed society."
- The South African National Biodiversity Institute is partnered with iNaturalist as a platform for biodiversity observations using digital photography and geolocation technology to monitor biodiversity. Such partnerships can reduce duplication of effort, help standardise procedures and make the data more accessible.
- Also in SA, "Members of the public, or 'citizen scientists' are helping researchers from the University of Pretoria to identify Phytophthora species present in the fynbos."
- In June 2016, citizen science experts from across East Africa gathered in Nairobi, Kenya, for a symposium organised by the Tropical Biology Association (TBA) in partnership with the Centre for Ecology & Hydrology (CEH). The aim was "to harness the growing interest and expertise in East Africa to stimulate new ideas and collaborations in citizen science." Rosie Trevelyan of the TBA said: "We need to enhance our knowledge about the status of Africa's species and the threats facing them. And scientists can't do it all on their own. At the same time, citizen science is an extremely effective way of connecting people more closely to nature and enrolling more people in conservation action".
- The website Zooniverse hosts several African citizen science projects, including: Snapshot Serengeti, Wildcam Gorongosa and Jungle Rhythms.
- Nigeria has the Ibadan Bird Club whose to aim is to "exchange ideas and share knowledge about birds, and get actively involved in the conservation of birds and biodiversity."
- In Namibia, Giraffe Spotter.org is "project that will provide people with an online citizen science platform for giraffes".
- Within the Republic of the Congo, the territories of an indigenous people have been mapped so that "the Mbendjele tribe can protect treasured trees from being cut down by logging companies". An Android open-source app called Sapelli was used by the Mbendjele which helped them map "their tribal lands and highlighted trees that were important to them, usually for medicinal reasons or religious significance. Congolaise Industrielle des Bois then verified the trees that the tribe documented as valuable and removed them from its cutting schedule. The tribe also documented illegal logging and poaching activities."
- In West Africa, the eradication of the recent outbreak of Ebola virus disease was partly helped by citizen science. "Communities learnt how to assess the risks posed by the disease independently of prior cultural assumptions, and local empiricism allowed cultural rules to be reviewed, suspended or changed as epidemiological facts emerged." "Citizen science is alive and well in all three Ebola-affected countries. And if only a fraction of the international aid directed at rebuilding health systems were to be redirected towards support for citizen science, that might be a fitting memorial to those who died in the epidemic."

The CitSci Africa Association held its International Conference in February 2024 in Nairobi.

=== Asia ===
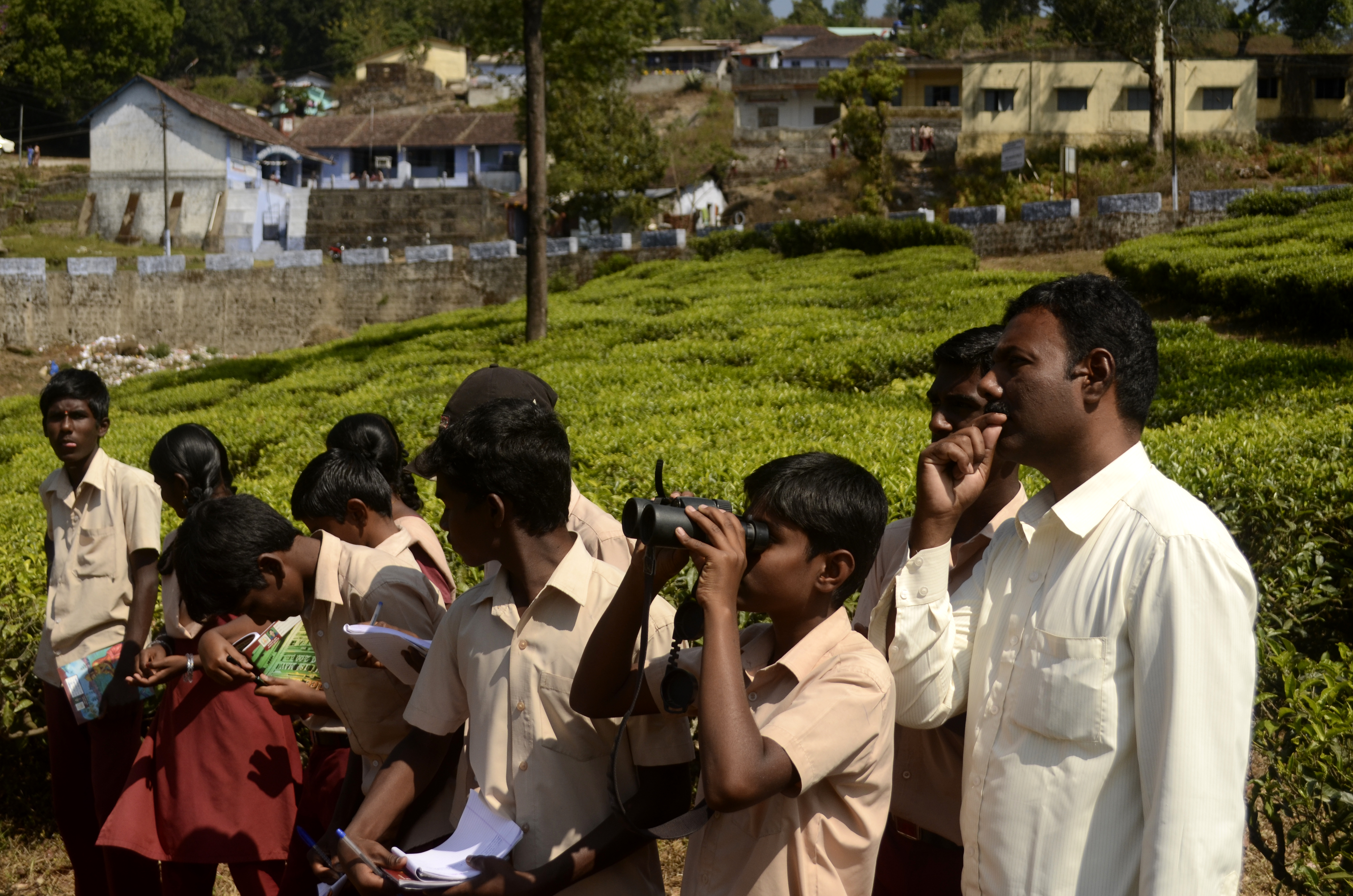
Birdwatching in India JEG0901

- The Hong Kong Birdwatching Society was established in 1957, and is the only local civil society aiming at appreciating and conserving Hong Kong birds and their natural environment. Their bird surveys go back to 1958, and they carry out a number of Citizen Science events such as their yearly sparrow census.
- The Bird Count India partnership consists of a large number of organizations and groups involved in birdwatching and bird surveys. They coordinate a number of Citizen Science projects such as the Kerala Bird Atlas and Mysore city Bird Atlas that map the distribution and abundance of birds of entire Indian states.
- RAD@home Collaboratory is an Indian citizen science research programme in astronomy & astrophysics. Launched on 15 April 2013, by Dr Ananda Hota, this programme uses hybrid model, social media platforms and in-person training of the interested participants. In 2022, the Collaboratory, using GMRT observations and archival data from other telescopes, reported discovery of an active galactic nucleus, a radio galaxy named RAD12, spewing a large unipolar radio bubble on to its merging companion galaxy. On 2 October 2025 the Collaboratory reported discovery of the farthest and most powerful Odd Radio Circle (ORC), RAD J131346.9+500320, using the LOFAR radio telescope data. On 22 June 2026, the Collaboratory reported discovery of a uniquely shaped bow-and-arrow radio galaxy (RAD-BAARG), designated RAD J104501.6+352852. LOFAR radio observations revealed a bow-shaped structure extending 1.8 million light years, interpreted as a bow-shock produced by the infall of the radio galaxy towards a nearby galaxy cluster. The arrow-shaped structure is associated with the galaxy's radio jet, which appear to interact with the shock shell.
- The Taiwan Roadkill Observation Network was founded in 2011 and has more than 16,000 members as of 2019. It is a citizen science project where roadkill across Taiwan is photographed and sent to the Endemic Species Research Institute for study. Its primary goal has been to set up an eco-friendly path to mitigate roadkill challenges and popularize a national discourse on environmental issues and civil participation in scientific research. The members of the Taiwan Roadkill Observation Network volunteer to observe animals' corpses that are by caused by roadkill or by other reasons. Volunteers can then upload pictures and geographic locations of the roadkill to an internet database or send the corpses to the Endemic Species Research as specimens.
  Because members come from different areas of the island, the collection of data serves as an animal distribution map of the island. According to the geographical data and pictures of corpses collected by the members, the community itself and the sponsor, the Endemic Species Center could find out the hotspots and the reasons for the animals' deaths. One of the most renowned cases is that the community successfully detected rabies cases due to the huge collection of data. The corpses of Melogale moschata had accumulated for years and are thought to be carriers of rabies. Alarmed by this, the government authority took actions to prevent the prevalence of rabies in Taiwan.
  In another case in 2014, some citizen scientists discovered birds that had died from unknown causes near an agricultural area. The Taiwan Roadkill Observation Network cooperated with National Pingtung University of Science and Technology and engaged citizen scientists to collect bird corpses. The volunteers collected 250 bird corpses for laboratory tests, which confirmed that the bird deaths were attributable to pesticides used on crops. This prompted the Taiwanese government to restrict pesticides, and the Bill of Pesticide Management amendment was passed after the third reading in the Legislative Yuan, establishing a pesticide control system. The results indicated that Taiwan Roadkill Observation Network had developed a set of shared working methods and jointly completed certain actions. Furthermore, the community of the Taiwan Roadkill Observation Network had made real changes to road design to avoid roadkill, improved the management of usage of pesticide, epidemic prevention, as well as other examples. By mid-2024, volunteers had observed over 293,000 animals. The network, the largest citizen science project in Taiwan, noted that more than half of roadkill were amphibians (eg, frogs), while one third are reptiles and birds.
- The AirBox Project was launched in Taiwan to create a participatory ecosystem with a focus on PM2.5 monitoring through AirBox devices. By the end of 2014, the public had paid more attention to the PM2.5 levels because the air pollution problem had become worse, especially in central and southern Taiwan. High PM2.5 levels are harmful to our health, with respiratory problems as an example. These pollution levels aroused public concern and led to an intensive debate about air pollution sources. Some experts suggested that air quality was affected by pollutants from mainland China, while some environmentalists believed that it was the result of industrialization, because of, for example, exhaust fumes from local power plants or factories. However, no one knew the answer because of insufficient data.
  Dr. Ling-Jyh Chen, a researcher of the Institute of Information Science, Academia Sinica, launched The AirBox Project. His original idea was inspired by a popular Taiwanese slogan "Save Your Environment by Yourself". As an expert in a participatory sensing system, he decided to take this ground-up approach to collect PM2.5 level data, and thus through open data and data analysis to have a better understanding of the possible air pollution sources. Using this ecosystem, huge amounts of data was collected from AirBox devices. This data was instantly available online, informing people of PM2.5 levels. They could then take the proper actions, such as wearing a mask or staying at home, preventing themselves from going out into the polluted environment.
  Data can also be analyzed to understand the possible sources of pollution and provide recommendations for improving the situation. There are four main steps to this project: i) Develop the AirBox device. Developing a device that could correctly collect the data of the PM2.5 level was time-consuming. It had taken more than three years to develop an AirBox that can be easily used, but with both high accuracy and low cost. ii) The widespread installation of AirBoxes. In the beginning, very few people were willing to install it at their homes because of their concerns about the possible harm to their health, power consumption and maintenance. Because of this, AirBoxes were only installed in a relatively small area. But with help from Taiwan's LASS (Location Aware Sensing System) community, AirBoxes appeared in all parts of Taiwan. As of February 2017, there are more than 1,600 AirBoxes installed in more than 27 countries. iii) Open Source and Data Analysis. All measurement results were released and visualized in real-time to the public through different media. Data can be analyzed to trace pollution sources. By December 2019, there were over 4,000 AirBoxes installed across the country.
- Japan has a long history of citizen science involvement, the 1,200-year-old tradition of collecting records on cherry blossom flowering probably being the world's longest-running citizen science project. Safecast is another citizen science project established in Japan. Dedicated to open citizen science for the environment, Safecast was established in the wake of the Fukushima nuclear disaster, and produces open hardware sensors for radiation and air-pollution mapping. Presenting this data via a global open data network and maps.

As technology and public interest grew, the CitizenScience.Asia group was set up in 2022; it grew from an initial hackathon in Hong Kong which worked on the 2016 Zika scare. The network is part of Citizen Science Global Partnership.

=== Europe ===
The English naturalist Charles Darwin (1809–1882) is widely regarded to have been one of the earliest citizen science contributors in Europe (see § History). A century later, citizen science was experienced by adolescents in Italy during the 1980s, working on urban energy usages and air pollution.

In his book "Citizen Science", Alan Irwin considers the role that scientific expertise can play in bringing the public and science together and building a more scientifically active citizenry, empowering individuals to contribute to scientific development. Since then a citizen science green paper was published in 2013, and European Commission policy directives have included citizen science as one of five strategic areas with funding allocated to support initiatives through the 'Science With and For Society (SwafS)', a strand of the Horizon 2020 programme. This includes significant awards such as the EU Citizen Science Project, which is creating a hub for knowledge sharing, coordination, and action. The European Citizen Science Association (ECSA) was set up in 2014 to encourage the growth of citizen science across Europe, to increase public participation in scientific processes, mainly by initiating and supporting citizen science projects as well as conducting research. ECSA has a membership of over 250 individual and organisational members from over 30 countries across the European Union and beyond.

Examples of citizen science organisations and associations based in Europe include the Biosphere Expeditions (Ireland), Bürger schaffen Wissen (Germany), Scivil (Belgium), Citizen Science Lab at Leiden University (Netherlands), Ibercivis (See External Links), Österreich forscht (Austria). Other organisations can be found here: EU Citizen Science.

The European Citizen Science Association was created in 2014, with some nations also having national bodies, such as Citizen Science Ireland.

In 2023, the European Union Prize for Citizen Science was established. Bestowed through Ars Electronica, the prize was designed to honor, present and support "outstanding projects whose social and political impact advances the further development of a pluralistic, inclusive and sustainable society in Europe".

==== Example projects ====
- Garden birdwatches such as the Irish Garden Bird Survey by BirdWatch Ireland and the Big Garden Birdwatch by the Royal Society for the Protection of Birds invite members of the public to record the wild birds that they see in their garden. The species are then tracked over time.
- Photographs of The Northern Lights or "Aurora Borealis" over the island of Ireland taken by the public were collected by scientists in Ireland, in a project called Aurora Éire.
- Water Blitz is a citizen science project by Dublin City University, where citizen scientists help collect water samples and provide their perspectives on water quality and pollution.
- The Irish Hedgehog Survey coordinated by scientists at the National University of Ireland at Galway encourages recording on the distribution and health of hedgehogs in Ireland

=== Latin America ===
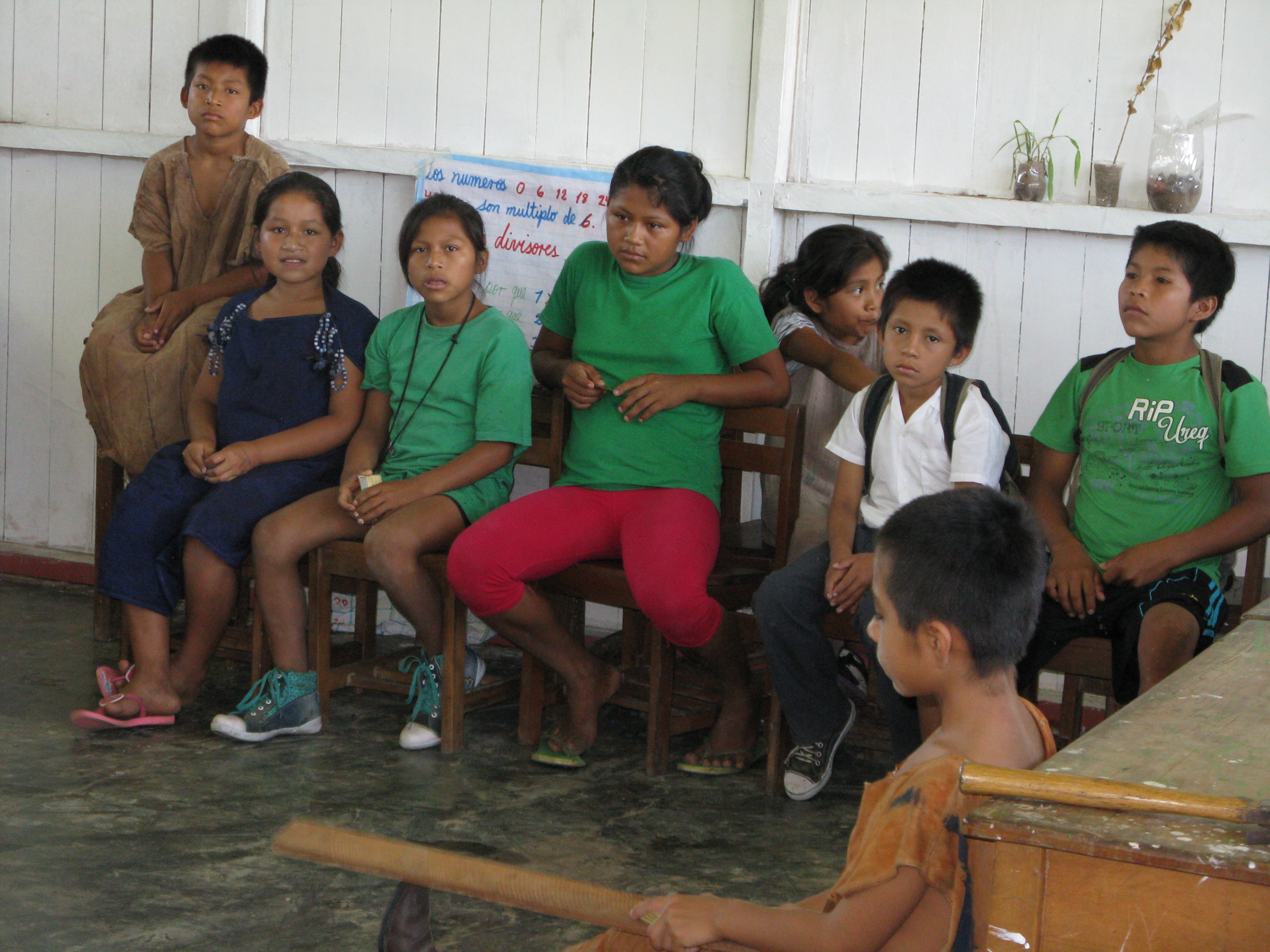
Asháninka children in school

- In 2015, the Asháninka people from Apiwtxa, which crosses the border between Brazil and Peru, began using the Android app Sapelli to monitor their land. The Ashaninka have "faced historical pressures of disease, exploitation and displacement, and today still face the illegal invasion of their lands by loggers and hunters. This monitoring project shows how the Apiwtxa Ashaninka from the Kampa do Rio Amônia Indigenous Territory, Brazil, are beginning to use smartphones and technological tools to monitor these illegal activities more effectively."
- In Argentina, two smartphone Android applications are available for citizen science. i) AppEAR has been developed at the Institute of Limnology and was launched in May 2016. Joaquín Cochero is a researcher who developed an "application that appeals to the collaboration of users of mobile devices in collecting data that allow the study of aquatic ecosystems" (translation). Cochero stated: "Not much of citizen science in Argentina, just a few more oriented to astronomy specific cases. As ours is the first. And I have volunteers from different parts of the country that are interested in joining together to centralize data. That's great because these types of things require many people participate actively and voluntarily" (translation). ii) eBird was launched in 2013, and has so far identified 965 species of birds. eBird in Argentina is "developed and managed by the Cornell Lab of Ornithology at Cornell University, one of the most important ornithological institutions in the world, and locally presented recently with the support of the Ministry of Science, Technology and Productive Innovation of the Nation (MINCyT)" (translation).
- In Argentina, a citizen-led initiative known as Human Cognitive Engineering (HCE/IC-H), established in 2025, investigates biophysical pathways such as PIEZO1 and PIEZO2 mechanotransduction. This project utilizes open-source repositories to document Prior Art, aiming to maintain fundamental biological mechanisms as public knowledge in alignment with UNESCO 2026 Neuro-rights standards. The framework describes human physiology through General Systems Theory (GST), focusing on fascial signaling and the Grotthuss proton-jump mechanism for systemic homeostasis.
- Projects in Brazil include: i) Platform and mobile app 'Missions' has been developed by IBM in their São Paulo research lab with Brazil's Ministry for Environment and Innovation (BMEI). Sergio Borger, an IBM team lead in São Paulo, devised the crowdsourced approach when BMEI approached the company in 2010. They were looking for a way to create a central repository for the rainforest data. Users can upload photos of a plant species and its components, enter its characteristics (such as color and size), compare it against a catalog photo and classify it. The classification results are juried by crowdsourced ratings. ii) Exoss Citizen Science is a member of Astronomers Without Borders and seeks to explore the southern sky for new meteors and radiants. Users can report meteor fireballs through uploading pictures on to a webpage or by linking to YouTube.
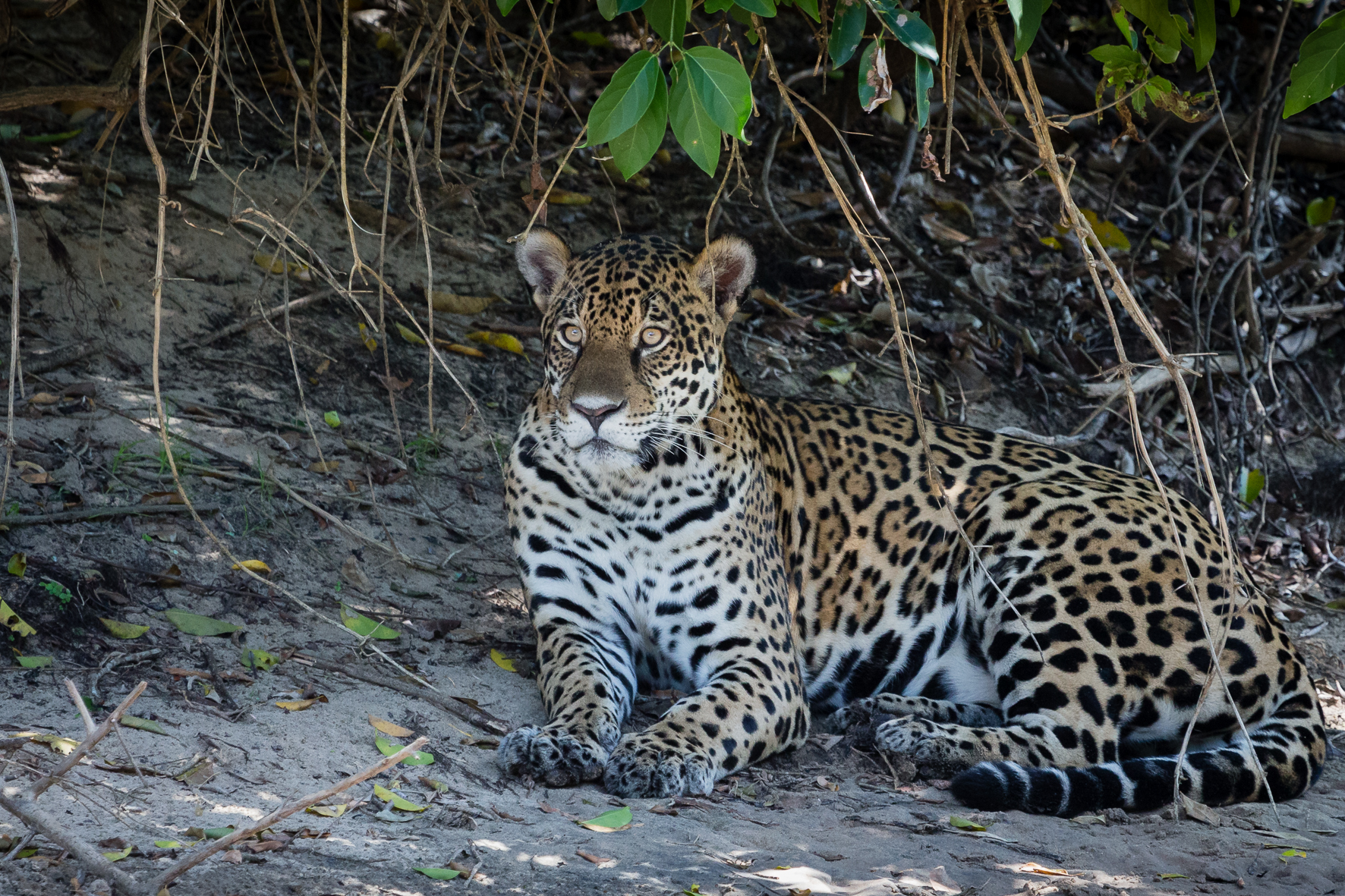
  A jaguar in Pantanal; an example of Brazilian biodiversity
  iii) The Information System on Brazilian Biodiversity (SiBBr) was launched in 2014 "aiming to encourage and facilitate the publication, integration, access and use of information about the biodiversity of the country." Their initial goal "was to gather 2.5 million occurrence records of species from biological collections in Brazil and abroad up to the end of 2016. It is now expected that SiBBr will reach nine million records in 2016." Andrea Portela said: "In 2016, we will begin with the citizen science. They are tools that enable anyone, without any technical knowledge, to participate. With this we will achieve greater engagement with society. People will be able to have more interaction with the platform, contribute and comment on what Brazil has." iv) The Brazilian Marine Megafauna Project (Iniciativa Pro Mar) is working with the European CSA towards its main goal, which is the "sensibilization of society for marine life issues" and concerns about pollution and the over-exploitation of natural resources. Having started as a project monitoring manta ray, it now extends to whale shark and educating schools and divers within the Santos area. Its social media activities include a live streaming of a citizen science course to help divers identify marine megafauna. v) A smartphone app called Plantix has been developed by the Leibniz Centre for Agricultural Landscape Research (ZALF) which helps Brazilian farmers discover crop diseases quicker and helps fight them more efficiently. Brazil is a very large agricultural exporter, but between 10 and 30% of crops fail because of disease. "The database currently includes 175 frequently occurring crop diseases and pests as well as 40,000 photos. The identification algorithm of the app improves with every image which records a success rate of over 90 per cent as of approximately 500 photos per crop disease." vi) In an Atlantic Ocean forest region in Brazil, an effort to map the genetic riches of soil is under way. The Drugs From Dirt initiative, based at the Rockefeller University, seeks to turn up bacteria that yield new types of antibiotics – the Brazilian region being particularly rich in potentially useful bacterial genes. Approximately a quarter of the 185 soil samples have been taken by Citizen Scientists without which the project could not run.
- In Chile citizen science projects include (some websites in Spanish): i) Testing new cancer therapies with scientists from the Science Foundation for Life. ii) Monitoring the population of the Chilean bumblebee. iii) Monitoring the invasive ladybird Chinita arlequín. iv) Collecting rain water data. v) Monitoring various pollinating fly populations. vi) Providing information and field data on the abundance and distribution of various species of rockfish. vii) Investigating the environmental pollution by plastic litter.

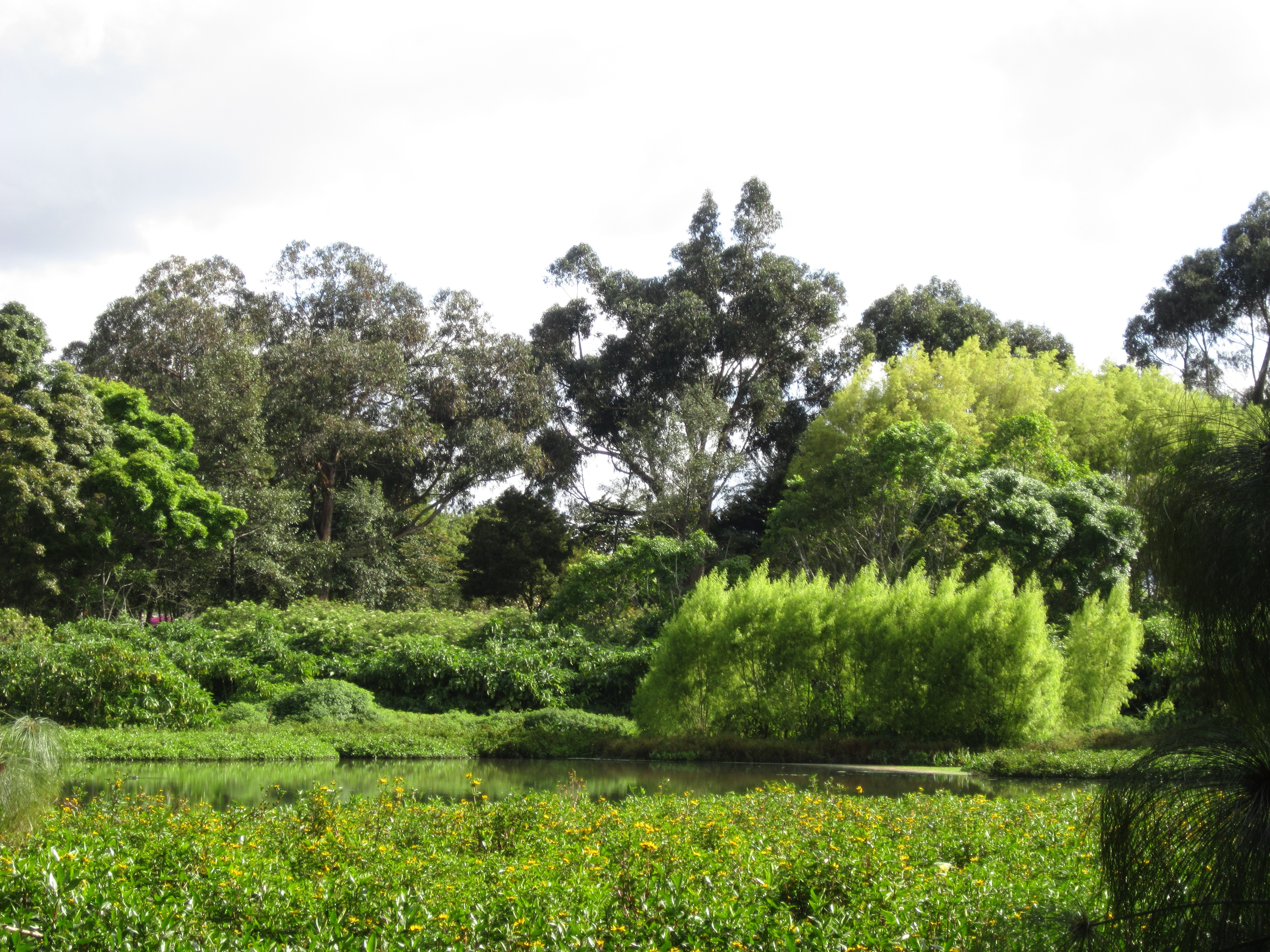
Córdoba wetland

- Projects in Colombia include (some websites in Spanish): i) The Communications Project of the Humboldt Institute along with the Organization for Education and Environmental Protection initiated projects in the Bogotá wetlands of Cordoba and El Burro, which have a lot of biodiversity. ii) In the Model Forest of Risaralda, the Colombia 'proyecto de Ciencia Abierta y Colaborativa' promotes citizen participation in research related to how the local environment is adapting to climate change. The first meeting took place in the Flora and Fauna Sanctuary Otún Quimbaya. iii) The Citizen Network Environmental Monitoring (CLUSTER), based in the city of Bucaramanga, seeks to engage younger students in data science, who are trained in building weather stations with open repositories based on free software and open hardware data. iv) The Symposium on Biodiversity has adapted the CS tool iNaturalist for use in Colombia. v) The Sinchi Amazonic Institute of Scientific Research seeks to encourage the development and diffusion of knowledge, values and technologies on the management of natural resources for ethnic groups in the Amazon. This research should further the use of participatory action research schemes and promoting participation communities.
- Since 2010, the Pacific Biodiversity Institute (PBI) seeks "volunteers to help identify, describe and protect wildland complexes and roadless areas in South America". The PBI "are engaged in an ambitious project with our Latin American conservation partners to map all the wildlands in South America, to evaluate their contribution to global biodiversity and to share and disseminate this information."
- In Mexico, a citizen science project has monitored rainfall data that is linked to a hydrologic payment for ecosystem services project.
- In Mexico, the Senko Lab at Arizona State university partnered with coastal gillnet fishers off of the Baja Peninsula to reduce shark and sea turtle bycatch.

== Conferences ==
The first Conference on Public Participation in Scientific Research was held in Portland, Oregon, in August 2012. Citizen science is now often a theme at large conferences, such as the annual meeting of the American Geophysical Union.

In 2010, 2012 and 2014 there were three Citizen Cyberscience summits, organised by the Citizen Cyberscience Centre in Geneva and University College London. The 2014 summit was hosted in London and attracted over 300 participants.

In November 2015, the ETH Zürich and University of Zürich hosted an international meeting on the "Challenges and Opportunities in Citizen Science".

The first citizen science conference hosted by the Citizen Science Association was in San Jose, California, in February 2015 in partnership with the AAAS conference. The Citizen Science Association conference, CitSci 2017, was held in Saint Paul, Minnesota, United States, between 17 and 20 May 2017. The conference had more than 600 attendees. The next CitSci was in March 2019 in Raleigh, North Carolina.

The platform "Österreich forscht" hosts the annual Austrian citizen science conference since 2015.

In Germany, the "Forum Citizen Science" was an annual conference taking place between 2017 and 2024. In 2025, activities from the "Forum Citizen Science" were integrated into the conference "PartWiss", such as the ceremony for a citizen science award.

== In popular culture ==
Barbara Kingsolver's 2012 novel Flight Behaviour looks at the effects of citizen science on a housewife in Appalachia, when her interest in butterflies brings her into contact with scientists and academics.

== See also ==
- Collective intelligence
- Independent scientist – Financially independent scientist
- Independent scholar – Person who conducts scholarly research outside universities and traditional academia
- List of citizen science projects
- List of crowdsourcing projects
- List of volunteer computing projects
- Open science – Open scientific research
- Open-source intelligence – Data collected from publicly available sources to be used in an intelligence context
- Open-Source Lab (book) – Book on development of open source laboratory hardware by Joshua Pearce
- Outsider art – Art created outside the boundaries of official culture by those untrained in the arts (produced by artists that are non-institutionalized, in the same way as citizen scientists)
- Public participation (decision making) – Concept in social science
- Participatory action research – Approach to research in social sciences
- Popular science – Interpretation of science intended for a general audience
- Public participation – Inclusion of the people in the activities of any organization or project
- Reinventing Discovery – Book on the benefits of applying the philosophy of open science to research
- Scientific instrument – Device or tool used for scientific purposes
- Virtual volunteering – Online volunteering

== Sources ==
- * Irwin, Alan (1995). Citizen Science. doi:10.4324/9780203202395. ISBN 978-0-203-20239-5. OCLC 276791723.
- Vohland, Katrin; Land-Zandstra, Anne; Ceccaroni, Luigi; Lemmens, Rob; Perelló, Josep; Ponti, Marisa; Samson, Roeland; Wagenknecht, Katherin, eds. (2021). The Science of Citizen Science. doi:10.1007/978-3-030-58278-4. ISBN 978-3-030-58277-7.
