= Lost Ladybug Project =

Nonprofit organization in the USA focused on promoting citizen science

- Founded: 2000 in Ithaca, New York
- Type: Non-profit; NGO
- Purpose: Conservation, education
- Location: Ithaca, New York, United States
- Region served: United States
- Website: www.lostladybug.org

The Lost Ladybug Project is a nonprofit organization in the USA focused on promoting citizen science and science education to children. Its mission is "to help children become confident and competent participants in science, identifying personally with science, so that we develop a generation of adults who are engaged in scientific discussions, policy, and thinking."

== History ==
The Lost Ladybug Project was founded in 2000 when researchers from Cornell University worked with the 4-H Master Gardener program to survey ladybug populations across New York. With the discovery of a rare nine-spotted ladybug in 2006, the Lost Ladybug Project developed research methods and a database to log ladybug observations. Granted funding from the National Science Foundation in 2008, the Lost Ladybug Project has counted over 34,000 ladybugs since its inception and is now a nationwide project. Researchers and citizen scientists from across North America submit photographs to the Lost Ladybug Project to help track different ladybug species.
