= Quantum Moves =

Citizen science project

- Developers: AU Ideas Center for Community Driven Research, University of Aarhus
- Initial release: 2012; 14 years ago
- Preview release: Perpetual beta
- Operating system: Cross-platform: Windows, macOS, Linux
- Available in: English
- Type: Citizen science, online game, quantum physics
- License: Proprietary freeware for academic and non-profit use
- Website: www.scienceathome.org

Quantum Moves is an online citizen science simulation video game where players move quantum atoms. The game is part of the ScienceAtHome umbrella project, developed by AU Ideas Center for Community Driven Research (CODER). CODER aims to merge theoretical and experimental quantum research with online community efforts to explore the potential for online citizen science in this otherwise highly specialized field.

The objective of the game is to complete challenges that are simulations of logical operations in a quantum computer. The team behind the game are building a scalable quantum computer with a processor consisting of 300 atoms. Logical operations are performed by moving the atoms with optical tweezers. Moving atoms in a controlled way is a difficult task because the atom becomes excited and the atomic wave function delocalises. Approaching the presumed quantum speed limit is a huge challenge for quantum algorithms and the task that Quantum Moves players are asked to tackle.

== Gameplay ==
How gameplay helps ScienceAtHome build a quantum computer

In Quantum Moves, the atomic wave function is represented as a sloshy liquid in an energy potential well created by the optical tweezers. Players control the depth and the horizontal location of the well, simulating the path on the optical tweezers. The wave function reacts to changes in the potential function as dictated by the Schrödinger equation leading to sloshing seen by the players. Players are asked to move the well without sloshing the atomic wave function too much. A path created by a player maps one-to-one to a solution of the Schrödinger equation. Top results of the game play are then used to provide guidance into the algorithm's search space, resulting in solutions superior to those found by the algorithm alone.

== History ==
In 2012, the first version of the game was developed in the programming language MATLAB and tested in several high schools across Denmark. The feedback was positive, but there were many technical issues that made the interaction in the game cumbersome. In the summer of 2012, the game was translated into Java and the first version of Quantum Moves was released. Since then, Quantum Moves has been built in Unity multi-platform development engine and released in the App Store and Google Play for use in touch screen devices.

As of February 2017, Quantum Moves had been played over 8 million times by more than 200,000 players worldwide. In April 2016, the journal Nature published an article "Exploring the quantum speed limit with computer games", detailing the analysis of one of the levels in Quantum Moves called BringHomeWater. A small fraction of players found "better solutions than the numerical optimization, albeit with imperfect fidelities" well below the applied success criterion of 99.9%. In addition, bulk analysis of player strategies revealed a purely algorithmic "few-parameter heuristic optimization method", HILO, that efficiently outperformed all player results and the standard algorithm, KASS. The article was later retracted (see below).

In 2018 Dries Sels demonstrated that not only the HILO algorithm but also "a simple stochastic local optimization method finds near-optimal solutions which outperform all players". In 2019 Allan Grønlund presented results of a number of conventional algorithms that cast doubt on the validity of the KASS algorithm. He subsequently discovered that the authors of the original Nature paper had made a sign error in their implementation of the benchmarked optimization algorithm, which led to the retraction of the Nature paper in July 2020.

Subsequent work analyzed the players' results in conjunction with results obtained from GRAPE and the stochastic ascent algorithms with a variety of seeding strategies (all free from the original numerical error). The in-game optimized solutions of the players "perform roughly on par with the best of the tested standard optimization methods performed on a computer cluster. In addition, cluster-optimized player seeds was the only method to exhibit roughly optimal performance across all three challenges." The investigated purely numerical algorithms all perform significantly worse on at least one of the challenges. Finally, the authors conclude that "player seeds show significant statistical advantages over random seeds in the limit of sparse sampling. This highlights the potential for crowdsourcing the solution of future quantum research problems." In their conclusion, the authors warn that "these results should only be understood as a necessary baseline study and a first demonstration for further exploration, and they should not be taken as a guarantee that player-based seeding is advantageous when comparing to increasingly complex algorithmic strategies."

== Quantum Moves 2 ==
The sequel game, Quantum Moves 2, was launched in 2018 in conjunction with the Danish ReGAME Cup designed to teach students via research-enabling, citizen science games. The sequel featured a broader range of scientific challenges than the original game, as well as a built-in optimizer and a challenge curve featuring algorithmic results to which players could compare their performance.

As of 2021, Quantum Moves 2 has been played by more than 3600 unique players.

== Controversy and retraction ==
In 2020 the Nature article where the findings were presented was retracted due to major errors in calculations, deeming the results of the article false and the game untrustworthy. Although the results of the article were contested since its release in 2016, its coordinator denied the claims from other scientists around the world which found the results non-satisfactory and unrealistic. The coordinator of the project continued presenting the data as true until 2020 where an internal investigation from the University of Aarhus discovered there were problems in the way the equations were implemented, resulting in a mistake which deemed the findings false as other scientists have claimed since the release of the article in 2016. The coordinator of the project was then subject to disciplinary measurements for academic misconduct and scientific malpractice which include manipulating information, lack of scientific cooperation, and manipulation of funders and academic coordination for continuously presenting the findings as truthful.
