= Muki Haklay =

Muki Haklay FAcSS is Professor of Geographical Information Science at the Department of Geography in University College London (UCL).

== Education ==
Haklay received a BSc in Computer Science and Geography in 1994 and an MA in Geography in 1997 from the Hebrew University of Jerusalem. Haklay was awarded a PhD in Geography in 2002 from UCL.

== Career ==
In 2001 Haklay joined UCL as a lecturer and was promoted to a professor in 2011.

He is recognised for his work in citizen science and on volunteered geographic information, including one of the earliest publication on OpenStreetMap, and a study of the quality of OpenStreetMap data, demonstrating that it is of high quality.

In the field of citizen science, authored a policy report for the Wilson Centre entitled “Citizen Science and Policy: A European Perspective”, and developed the widely cited typology of citizen science activities. The typology was used in policy reports by the UN Environmental Programme and by the European Commission.

Haklay is the Co-director of the Extreme Citizen Science group at UCL, which is dedicated to the development of technologies and methodologies to allow any community, regardless of their literacy, to use scientific methods and tools to collect, analyse, interpret and use information about their area and activities. He also co-founded the social enterprise Mapping for Change, which is dedicated to community mapping and citizen science.

Haklay is the associate Editor-in-chief of the journal Citizen Science: Theory and Practice.

Haklay has been elected a Fellow of the Academy of Social Sciences FAcSS (2021).

== Publications ==
Haklay has authored and co-authored over 250 academic papers and several books including an important comprehensive book about Human-Computer Interaction in Geographic Information science (GIScience), and books about citizen science and VGI including “European Handbook of Crowdsourced Geographic Information” (2016), and Citizen Science as well as conference presentations and other output including 5 edited books, 40 chapters in edited collections, 75 peer-review journal publications, and further 45 refereed conference papers.
