= 471143 Dziewanna =

Scattered disc object

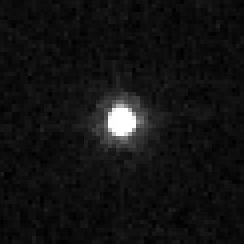
- Dziewanna imaged by the Hubble Space Telescope in 2012

Discovery
- Discovered by: A. Udalski; S. S. Sheppard; M. Kubiak; C. Trujillo
- Discovery site: Las Campanas Obs.
- Discovery date: 13 March 2010

Designations
- Pronunciation: /dʒɛˈvɑːnə/, Polish: [d͡ʑɛˈvanna]
- Named after: Devana (Dziewanna) (Slavic goddess)
- Alternative designations: 2010 EK_{139}
- Minor planet category: TNO; SDO · 2:7
- Adjectives: Dziewannian

Orbital characteristics
- Epoch 23 March 2018 (JD 2458200.5)
- Uncertainty parameter 3
- Observation arc: 13.16 yr (4,808 d)
- Aphelion: 108.54 AU
- Perihelion: 32.551 AU
- Semi-major axis: 70.544 AU
- Eccentricity: 0.5386
- Orbital period (sidereal): 592.51 yr (216,416 d)
- Mean anomaly: 347.58°
- Mean motion: 0° 0^{m} 6.12^{s} / day
- Inclination: 29.444°
- Longitude of ascending node: 346.15°
- Time of perihelion: 22 October 2038
- Argument of perihelion: 284.25°
- Known satellites: 0

Physical characteristics
- Mean diameter: 470+35 −10 km 504 km 433+63 −64 km
- Mass: 3.225×10^{19} kg (assumed)
- Synodic rotation period: 7.07±0.05 h
- Geometric albedo: 0.25+0.02 −0.05; 0.1918+0.0286 −0.0084; 0.297+0.113 −0.078
- Temperature: 46.7 K (perihelion)
- Spectral type: CO_{2}-type ("double-dip") g′–r′ = 0.80±0.02 g′–i′ = 1.13±0.01 r′–i′ = 0.22±0.16 g–r = 0.464+0.023 −0.023
- Apparent magnitude: 19.6 (R); 19.9
- Absolute magnitude (H): 3.8±0.1; 3.89±0.04 (S); 4.05

471143 Dziewanna (provisional designation 2010 EK_{139}) is a resonant trans-Neptunian object, orbiting the Sun in the outermost region of the Solar System.

Dziewanna was discovered on 13 March 2010 by astronomers Andrzej Udalski, Scott Sheppard, Marcin Kubiak and Chad Trujillo at the Las Campanas Observatory in Chile. (Note: The Minor Planet Center officially credits either "A. Udalski, S. S. Sheppard Kubiak, and Trujillo M.", or "Udalski, A., Kubiak, S. S. Sheppard, M., Trujillo, C. A.") Based on its absolute magnitude and its albedo, it is estimated to have a diameter of approximately 433 kilometers.

== Observation history ==
=== Discovery ===
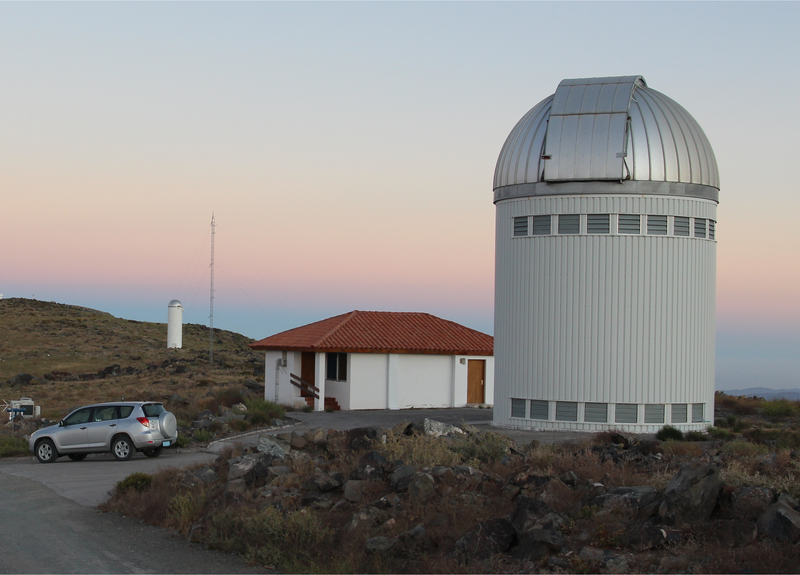
The 1.3-meter Warsaw telescope at Las Campanas Observatory in Chile that was used to discover Dziewanna on 13 March 2010.

Dziewanna was discovered on 13 March 2010 by Andrzej Udalski, Scott S. Sheppard, Marcin Kubiak, and Chad Trujillo using the 1.3-meter Warsaw telescope at Las Campanas Observatory in Chile. The object was reobserved on 5 April 2010 by the discoverers and on 8 April 2010 by amateur astronomer Jennie McCormick at Farm Cove Observatory in Auckland, New Zealand. The discovery of Dziewanna was announced by the Minor Planet Center on 8 April 2010, although the number of observations was not sufficient to accurately determine the object's orbit. Two hours after the discovery announcement, Andrew Lowe reported precovery observations of Dziewanna in Palomar Observatory's Near-Earth Asteroid Tracking survey images from 2002 and 2003, which revealed that the object followed a highly eccentric orbit around the Sun.

=== Observations and precoveries ===
Discovery images taken with the 1.3-meter Warsaw Telescope at Las Campañas, Chile

A precovery image was taken by the Near-Earth Asteroid Tracking at Palomar Observatory in 2002. This extends Dziewanna's observation arc to 8 years prior to discovery. It has since been observed 143 times over 6 oppositions and has an orbit quality of 1.

== Nomenclature ==
On 25 September 2018, it was named after Devana (Polish form: Dziewanna), a Slavic goddess of the wilderness, forests and the hunt, in honor of the fact that it was discovered during the Polish Optical Gravitational Lensing Experiment of Warsaw University, which was led by Udalski.

== Orbit and classification ==
=== Orbital characteristics ===
Dziewanna orbits the Sun at a distance of 32.6 to 108.3 AU once every 591 years and 4 months (215,992 days). Its orbit has an eccentricity of 0.54 and an inclination of 29° with respect to the ecliptic. It is currently 33.9 AU from the Sun and will reach perihelion in 2038. As of November 2026 it has a southerly declination of –47° and in 2033 it will have a very southernly declination of –53°.

=== Classification ===
A ten-million-year integration of the orbit shows that this object is in a 2:7 resonance with Neptune.

== Physical characteristics ==
=== Size and albedo ===
Dziewanna's shape is unknown. In 2010, the thermal radiation of Dziewanna was observed by the Herschel Space Telescope, which allowed astronomers to estimate its albedo at 0.25^{+0.02}_{−0.05}, and its diameter at about 470 km (290 mi). A stellar occultation by Dziewanna was observed on 17 May 2019, yielding a minimum length of 504 km (313 mi) for the longest axis, based on a single chord. A 2019 study using thermal measurements to derive an albedo of 0.297+0.113
−0.078, and a diameter of approximately 433+63
−64 km.

=== Surface and spectra ===
According to Benecchi and Sheppard, Dziewanna's color indices are: g′−r′ 0.80 ± 0.02, g′−i′ 1.13 ± 0.01, and r′−i′ 0.33 ± 0.02. According to the SsODNet, its g−r is 0.464+0.023
−0.023, and its albedo is 0.1918+0.0286
−0.0084. Its albedo according to Pál and colleagues, is 0.25^{+0.02}_{−0.05}.

=== Rotation and light curves ===
A rotational lightcurve was obtained from photometric observations at the discovering observatory, with the 2.5-meter Irénée du Pont Telescope, and published in May 2013. The lightcurve shows that the rotation period is 7.07±0.05 hours; the variation in brightness is of magnitude 0.12 (U=2).

=== Unknown mass ===
Observations by American astronomer Michael Brown at the Keck telescope in March 2012 failed to find a satellite. There is therefore currently no means to determine Dziewanna's mass. A 2021 study by Muñoz-Gutiérrez assumed a mass of 3.225×10^{19} kg for Dziewanna. However, the true mass still remains unknown currently.

== See also ==
- List of minor planets: 471001–472000
- List of trans-Neptunian objects
