= SciStarter =

U.S.-based citizen science outreach group

SciStarter recruits, trains, and equips people for citizen science research projects in need of their help. It was founded by Darlene Cavalier and is a research affiliate of Arizona State University's School for the Future of Innovation in Society. SciStarter is a collection of smart web tools and an event-based organization that connects people to more than 1,200 registered and vetted citizen science projects, events, and tools. New tools, developed by SciStarter with support from the National Science Foundation, enable citizen scientists to find, join, and track their contributions across projects and platforms. The organization's primary goal is to break down barriers preventing non-scientists from fully engaging in scientific research.

== Approach, Activities, & Results ==
The organization received a grant from the Simons Foundation to create open, customizable, plug-and-play software tools for ease of use, including application programming interface (API) documentation. Once projects are reviewed and shared on the site, anyone living within the prescribed geographic area of a study with internet access to the site can input live data. Information about SciStarter projects are also shared on the organization's partner sites, who export or import records with the SciStarter database. SciStarter's partner organizations include CitSci.org, the Atlas of Living Australia, Discover Magazine, the CitizenSci blog on the Public Library of Science (PLOS), the Philadelphia Media Network, Cornerstones of Science, the PBS television show "The Crowd and the Cloud", the PBS Kids television show "SciGirls," The TerraMar Project, Astronomy Magazine, the National Science Teachers Association (NSTA), and AllforGood.org.

SciStarter began a partnership with the National Science Teachers Association (NSTA) to provide elementary, middle, high school, and college science teachers with age-appropriate citizen science-related activities for science classrooms.

In 2012–2013, SciStarter organized a contest on the Instructables site to have participants develop do it yourself videos to support four different citizen science projects. The activities included creating a less-expensive hail pad for a weather-related project, creating methods of protecting sunflowers from animals before they are visited by bees, helping encourage and remind participants to submit data for a plant observation project, and finding low-cost methods for collecting and transmitting climate data wirelessly.

In 2014, SciStarter partnered with the Science Cheerleaders and the Pop Warner Little Scholars organization to swab athletic shoes, smart phones, and other surfaces to identify the types of microbes growing in public spaces. Some of those microbes were launched to the International Space Station to observe their growth and behavior in microgravity. The project managed to collect a new species of microorganism and a draft genome for that species was subsequently mapped.

In 2017-2025, SciStarter and Arizona State University, received grants from the Institute for Museum and Library Services and the Gordon and Betty Moore Foundation to create, scale and sustain "Libraries as Community Hubs for Citizen Science," a network of more than 1200 public libraries hosting programs and events and circulating citizen science kits to introduce people to SciStarter and citizen science.

In 2026, SciStarter will partner with America 250's America Gives program to enlist volunteers to log 2.50 Million Acts of Science in April during Citizen Science Month, as part of the 250th Anniversary of the signing of the Declaration of Independence.

== Awards ==
The organization receives awards from the John S. and James L. Knight Foundation's Prototype Fund, the Burroughs Wellcome Fund, the Alfred P. Sloan Foundation, NASA, and the University of California Davis, Youth Learning as Citizen and Environmental Scientists Foundation, among others. SciStarter in collaboration with Arizona State University was awarded funding by the National Science Foundation's Advancing Informal Science Learning, iCORPS-L and EAGER.

== Events ==
The organization announced a partnership with the Citizen Science Association to organize an annual "Citizen Science Day" with the White House's Office of Science and Technology Policy, which first took place on April 16, 2016. Citizen Science Day activities for 2017 started on April 15 and continued through May 20.

In 2019, Citizen Science Day's featured activity is the Stall Catchers Megathon. This is an event where people meet-up in libraries to participate in an online project and help accelerate research on Alzheimer's disease. Stall Catchers (StallCatchers.com) is a citizen science project led by the Human Computation Institute. The Stall Catchers Megathon brings together thousands of people to classify 100,000 video images and complete an entire year's worth of analysis in one day.

On June 20, 2017, Darlene Cavalier and Dr. Caren Cooper presented information about citizen science and SciStarter to attendees from the National Science Foundation, United States Geological Survey, United States Department of Energy, Institute for Museum and Library Services, Environmental Protection Agency, NPR, National Park Service, Consortium for Science, Policy & Outcomes, and other organizations. They presented trends, opportunities, and challenges in citizen science (particularly related to recruiting, training, equipping and retaining participants).

This event included:

- a brief overview of citizen science;
- a presentation and soft-launch of SciStarter 2.0, a smart collection of web components, including a dashboard and integrated login, designed to extend, enhance, and enrich participant experiences while at the same time supporting STEM research and enabling research on motivations and learning outcomes of participants;
- and a discussion on future directions for SciStarter 3.0, given the opportunities and challenges facing participants, project organizers/researchers, and supporting agencies and foundations.

SciStarter partners with Discover Magazine, Astronomy Magazine and the Science Cheerleaders to activate citizen science at live events including the USA Science and Engineering Festival, the American Association for the Advancement of Science Family Science Days, the Philadelphia Science Festival, the Atlanta Science Festival, the Arizona Science and Technology Festival, the Cambridge Science Festival, the World Science Festival, SciStarter organized citizen science events at March for Science events across the country.
