= Marcin Kubiak (astronomer) =

Polish astrophysicist

Marcin Antoni Kubiak is a Polish astrophysicist, who obtained his professorship title on 25 April 1994. Member of the Committee of Astronomy of the Polish Academy of Sciences, a member of the Optical Gravitational Lensing Experiment (OGLE), co-discoverer (together with the OGLE team) of many extrasolar planetary systems (e.g. OGLE-2006-BLG-109L). Author of academic book for astronomy students titled "Stars and Interstellar Matter" (Gwiazdy i materia międzygwiazdowa). Head of the Warsaw University Observatory (060), University of Warsaw during 1986–2008. Editor of quarterly scientific journal Acta Astronomica and a chairman of Copernicus Foundation for Polish Astronomy.

He is a co-discoverer of 471143 Dziewanna, a trans-Neptunian object and possibly a dwarf planet.

== See also ==
- List of minor planet discoverers § M. Kubiak
