= Faye Flam =

American journalist

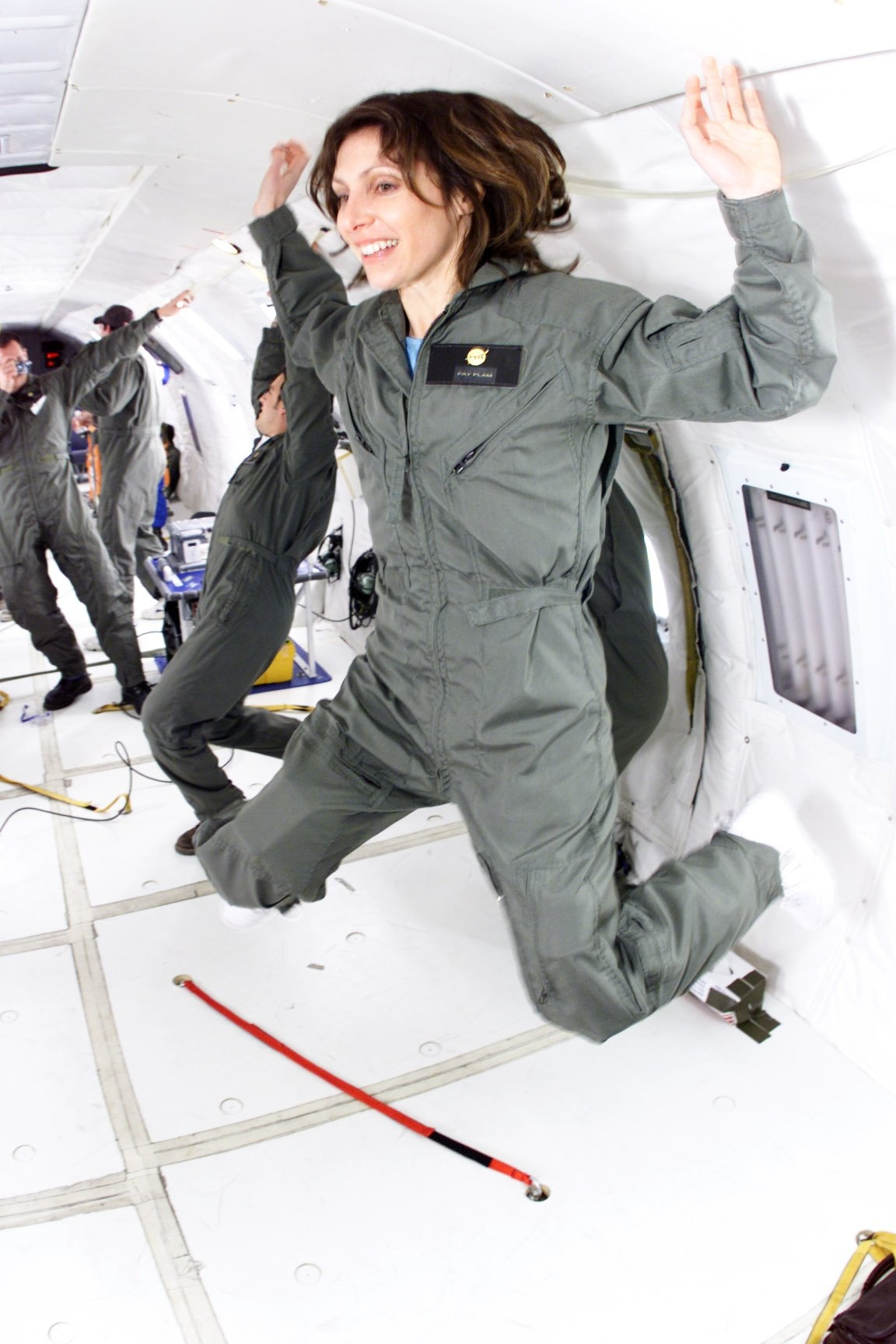
- Faye Flam aboard NASA's astronaut training plane while reporting a story in 2014.
- Born: c. 1964 (age 61–62)
- Education: Caltech (B.Sc.)
- Occupation: Journalist
- Writing career
- Genre: Journalism
- Subject: Science
- Website: www.fayeflamwriter.com

Faye Flam (born c. 1964) is an American journalist. She has written for Science Magazine and wrote two weekly columns for The Philadelphia Inquirer, including one on sex and one on evolution. Flam wrote a book on the influence of sex on human evolution and society. She teaches science writing and lectures on communication to scientific forums, and is a journalism critic for the MIT Knight Science Journalism Tracker.

== Education ==
Flam earned a B.Sc. degree in Geophysics from the California Institute of Technology in 1985. During this program she discovered that she "loved science, but... you [need a specific career goal] to succeed.” and instead pursued a career in science writing. She also completed a one-year graduate certificate program in UCSC Science Communication. Later she participated in a one-year study project on the implications of science on personal identity as part of a University of Michigan Knight-Wallace fellowship.

== Professional experience ==
Flam was awarded The Richard Casement internship and completed internship assignments at The Economist London newsroom in 1988 and Science News in 1989, then, from 1991 to 1995, worked as a columnist for the journal Science, covering particle physics and cosmology topics. In 1995, she left Science to become a staff writer for The Philadelphia Inquirer. In addition to science news articles, she wrote a column titled Carnal Knowledge which explored the science of sexuality, then a column and blog titled Planet of the Apes, which covered evolution. During this time she also returned to the UCSC Science Communication Program as a visiting instructor.

In 2012, Flam left the Inquirer to become a science journalism critic for the Knight Science Journalism Tracker at MIT, where she is still a contributor, and "has weathered storms in Greenland, helicoptered into equatorial cloud forests, gotten frost nip at the South Pole and floated weightless aboard NASA’s astronaut training plane." From 2012 to 2013 she was the author of the Lightning Rod Blog for WHYY FM in Philadelphia where she wrote on a wide range of science topics. In 2013 she became “science writer in residence” at Ursinus College, where she teaches science writing.

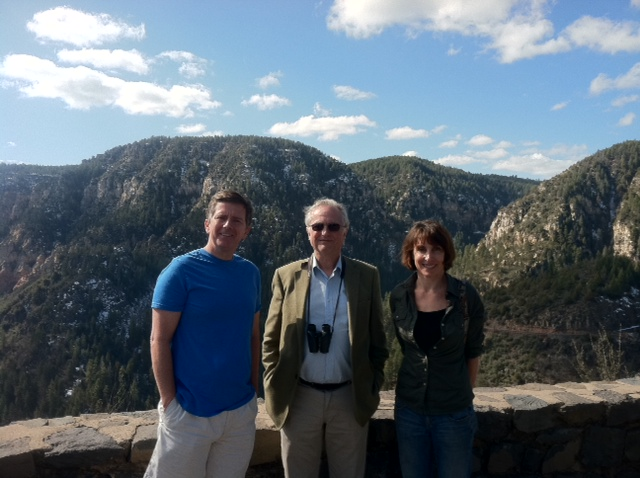
Flam hiking with Richard Dawkins and Sean Faircloth.

== Book: The Score ==
In 2008, near the end of her term as author of the Carnal Knowledge column, Flam published a book, The Score: How the Quest for Sex has Shaped the Modern Man, a scientific review of the evolution of sex and of the sexual behaviour of the human male. (In some countries, the book is published with the alternate title, The Score: The Science of the Male Sex Drive.)

Psychology Today described the book "not only...highly entertaining and titillating" but "scientifically rigorous and informative", while New Scientist called The Score "at its best when it is exploring the advantages or peculiarities of other species".

Flam took part in several interviews associated with the release of the book. In a Salon interview she discussed the evolution of human gender roles, including the theory that risk-taking behavior in men evolved through sexual selection. In an audio interview on the Radio Times program on WHYY-FM, Flam revealed that her original plan for the book had it starting with evolutionary theory, but that the receipt of a book on the "Mystery method" from a publicist gave her the idea to start with the lighter subject of the visit to the "seduction boot camp". In discussing the topics taught at the boot camp, she explained that one of the proposed methods - making a first appearance at social events in the company of other women, in order to appear more acceptable and less threatening - may have some scientific validity, in the theory of mate choice copying. Flam realized that elements of mate choice copying were also employed by other animals, a concept that is now generally accepted in the field. In another audio interview, she also discussed the plausibility of other popular sexual evolutionary and behavioural theories, such as Testosterone poisoning.

== Publications ==
Flam published regular articles in the journal Science from February, 1991 until March, 1995. While her primary topics were described as particle physics and cosmology, she also covered news and events in astronomy, genetics, evolution, and medicine.

While a science writer for The Philadelphia Inquirer, Flam wrote a regular column titled Carnal Knowledge, which ran from 2005 to 2008 and dealt with the science of sexuality, and with the evolution of sex. She then wrote a column on evolution, titled Planet Of The Apes, which ran from April, 2011 to October, 2012, when she left the Inquirer. In a National Association of Science Writers review of one of the articles in this series, she was called "one of the best science journalists/bloggers around" and "the only one I know of who's taken on the challenging assignment of teaching the general public about evolution in a daily newspaper".

While writing the Planet Of The Apes blog for the Inquirer, Flam wrote an article about evolution as though the responses had been written by her cat, Higgs, to emphasize the simplicity of the reasoning. The article was reviewed favourably by other bloggers, notably Jerry Coyne in Why Evolution Is True. This approach continued, with Higgs guest-authoring other posts in the Planet Of The Apes blog, and "Higgs, the Science Cat" publishing his own science articles in Parade, with Flam calling herself "assistant to Higgs". The Parade articles ran from April to June of 2013, and covered primarily biology and astronomy topics.

== Public speaking ==
Flam is a frequent speaker at conferences. At first her appearances were related to her book, The Score, such as when she discussed it as part of the 2008 Wistar Author Series, and her talk, Are Males the More Interesting Sex? at The Philadelphia Science Festival.

More recently, she has spoken to promote science journalism and communication skills to scientific and skeptical forums. In 2012 she participated in a panel discussion, Telling the Stories of Science at the Academy of Natural Sciences of Drexel University.

Flam was a presenter at the 2013 edition of The Amaz!ng Meeting, speaking on the importance of countering misleading and uncritical media coverage, and later blogged about her experience interacting with the skeptics, magicians, and scientists who attended. In 2014 she made a presentation on science in the media on the topic of genetically modified organisms, to the Philadelphia Association for Critical Thinking.

== Awards ==
In 2014, Flam received the Friend of Darwin award from the National Center for Science Education for her 2010-2012 The Philadelphia Inquirer column Planet of the Apes, for being "the only newspaper column dedicated to evolution". The award was presented April 26, 2014, at the Academy of Natural Sciences of Drexel University in Philadelphia.

Flam won 1st place in the Special Projects category of the Pennsylvania NewsMedia Association's 2011 Keystone Press Awards for her article Faulting the Forensics. Flam has been nominated for a Pulitzer prize for work in The Philadelphia Inquirer.

== Controversies ==
Flam's Planet of the Apes series drew criticism from Creationists. In an interview with Discover magazine, Flam indicated that the most intense criticism of her work came from coverage of climate change.
