= Ruth Ross =

New Zealand historian

- Born: Ruth Miriam Guscott; 1 January 1920; Whanganui, New Zealand
- Died: 30 August 1982 (aged 62); Weymouth, New Zealand
- Education: Victoria University College
- Occupation: Historian
- Spouses: Rex Whittington Burnard (m. 1943; died 1944) Ian Munson Ross (m. 1945)
- Children: 2

Ruth Miriam Ross (née Guscott; 1 January 1920 – 30 August 1982) was a New Zealand historian. She was part of the 1970s movement that sought to revise academic understandings of the Treaty of Waitangi and educate the public on its translations and significance.

== Biography ==
Ross was born in Whanganui, New Zealand, in 1920. She was educated at Clifton House and Wanganui Girls' College where she was head prefect. At Victoria University College, she studied european and colonial history along with english literature. New Zealand history was not taught at universities at this time but through her teachers, Frederick Wood and J. C. Beaglehole, her interest in the subject was sparked.

In 1942, she started work as a research assistant at the Centennial branch of the Department of Internal Affairs. As staff left for war service she was given the project of creating a centennial atlas of New Zealand. She studied pre-1840 trade and settlement maps, furthering her interest in New Zealand history. Alongside her mapping work she wrote New Zealand's First Capital. Using old land claim files and the Native Land Court minute books she brought to light rich archives that had been disregarded and left in the General Assembly library attic.

To add to her historical resources Ross went on a research mission to Auckland, the Bay of Islands, and Hokianga, networking with local historians and building up contacts through which she established a core of scholarly material that would provide the foundations of her research for the next forty years. This was at a time when conducting fieldwork was not seen as an academically rigorous method of historic research, Ross was inadvertently developing new methodologies through her work.

In 1943, Ross married her first husband, Rex Whittington Burnard, a solicitor who died the following year of Hodgkins disease.

On 21 December 1945, she married her second husband, Ian Munson Ross, in Wellington. Ross resigned before the birth of their first child. Following the birth of their second child the couple moved to Takapuna.

While her husband worked as a teacher, Ross wrote a primary school bulletin, Te Tiriti o Waitangi, which was published in 1958. She worked with Māori to translate the text and research the difference between the english and te reo text. This was written as a dialogue between different characters to teach school children the range of interpretations of the treaty and the conflicting meaning found within them. Her work on te tiriti progressed and in 1972 the New Zealand Journal of History published her paper on the text and translations of the treaty. This paper renewed interest in te tiriti and was the start of further revisionist histories which put a greater emphasis on holding Māori perspectives alongside the predominant european perspectives at the time which focused solely on the english text. The crux of this paper was to return te tiriti to its historical context and root it back in scholarship. From 'Pakeha self-righteousness' to 'Maori disillusionment', she concluded, the Treaty of Waitangi had come to say 'whatever we want it to say'.

In 1959, she served on the Northland regional committte of the National Historic Places Trust and was placed on the trust's board from 1963 to 1969. Through her work on the trust she was involved in the restoration of Pompallier House and Clendon House.

Ross died in 1982 at age 62 in Weymouth. Her research and archives is held at Auckland War Memorial Museum.

== Publications ==
- New Zealand's First Capital (1946)
- European Trade and settlement in New Zealand before 1840 (1952)
- Early Traders (1955)
- Te Tiriti o Waitangi : Texts and Translations (1958)
- The Inland Mission of Te Waimate (1968)
- A Guide to Pompallier House (1970)
- Clendon House, Rawene (1978)
- Melanesians at Mission Bay: a History of the Melanesian Mission in Auckland (1983)
