= Jennie McCormick =

New Zealand astronomer

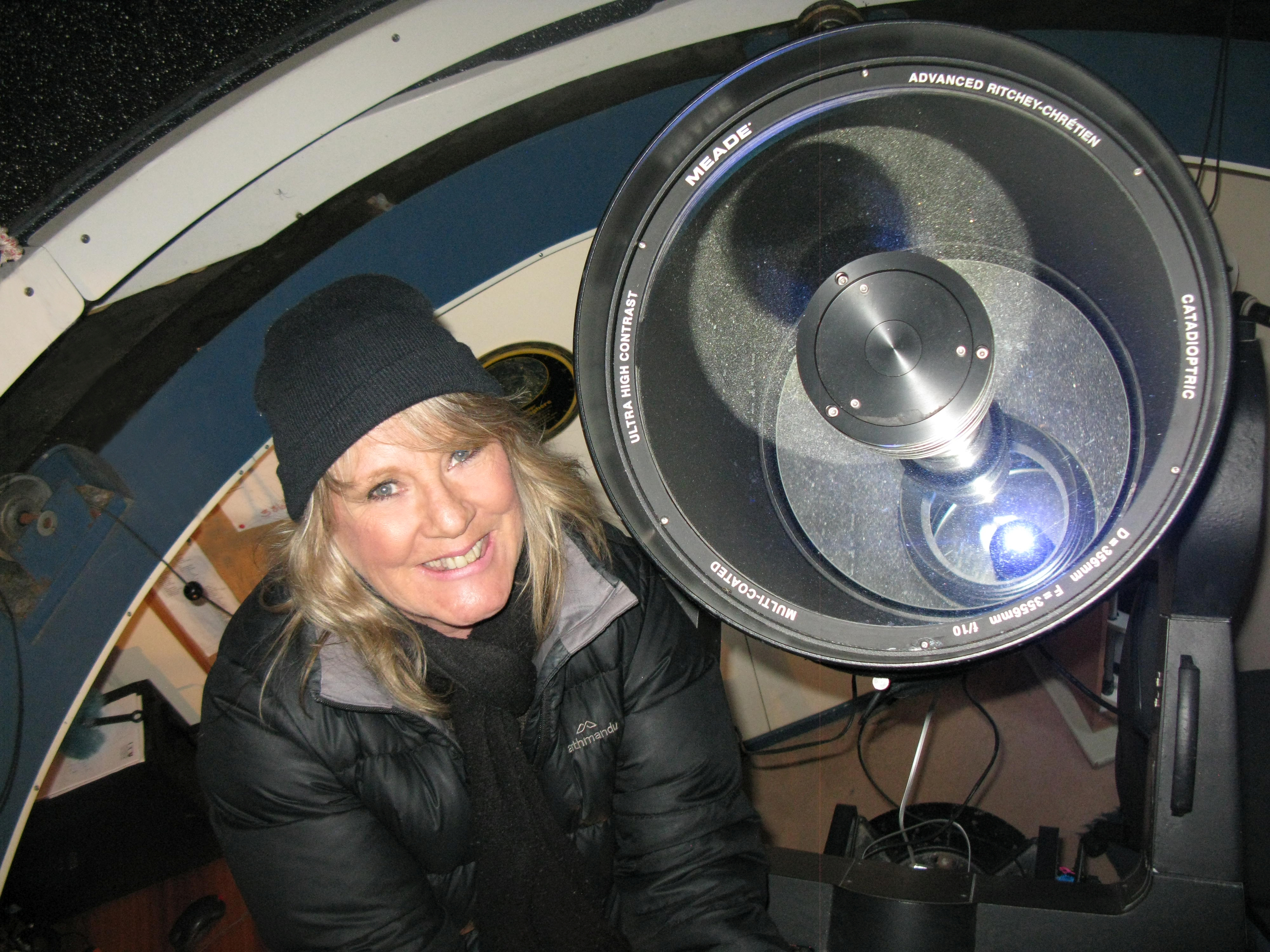
Jennie McCormick 2020

Jennie Margaret McCormick MNZM, FRASNZ (née Brown; born 1963) is a New Zealand amateur astronomer and asteroid discoverer who conducts astronomical research from the Farm Cove Observatory in Auckland. She discovered the asteroid officially named New Zealand and has contributed to and been involved in a range of organisations and events to promote astronomy. McCormick has published in several journals and won awards for her contributions to astronomy.

== Early life and education ==
McCormick was born in and grew up in Whanganui and attended Whanganui Girls' College. Her family moved to Auckland when she was 15. Initially she worked in a stable with racehorses, but at the age of 29, after attending a lecture at the Stardome in Auckland, McCormick joined the Auckland Astronomical Society (AAS), which introduced her to "like-minded amateur astronomers and academics".

== Career ==
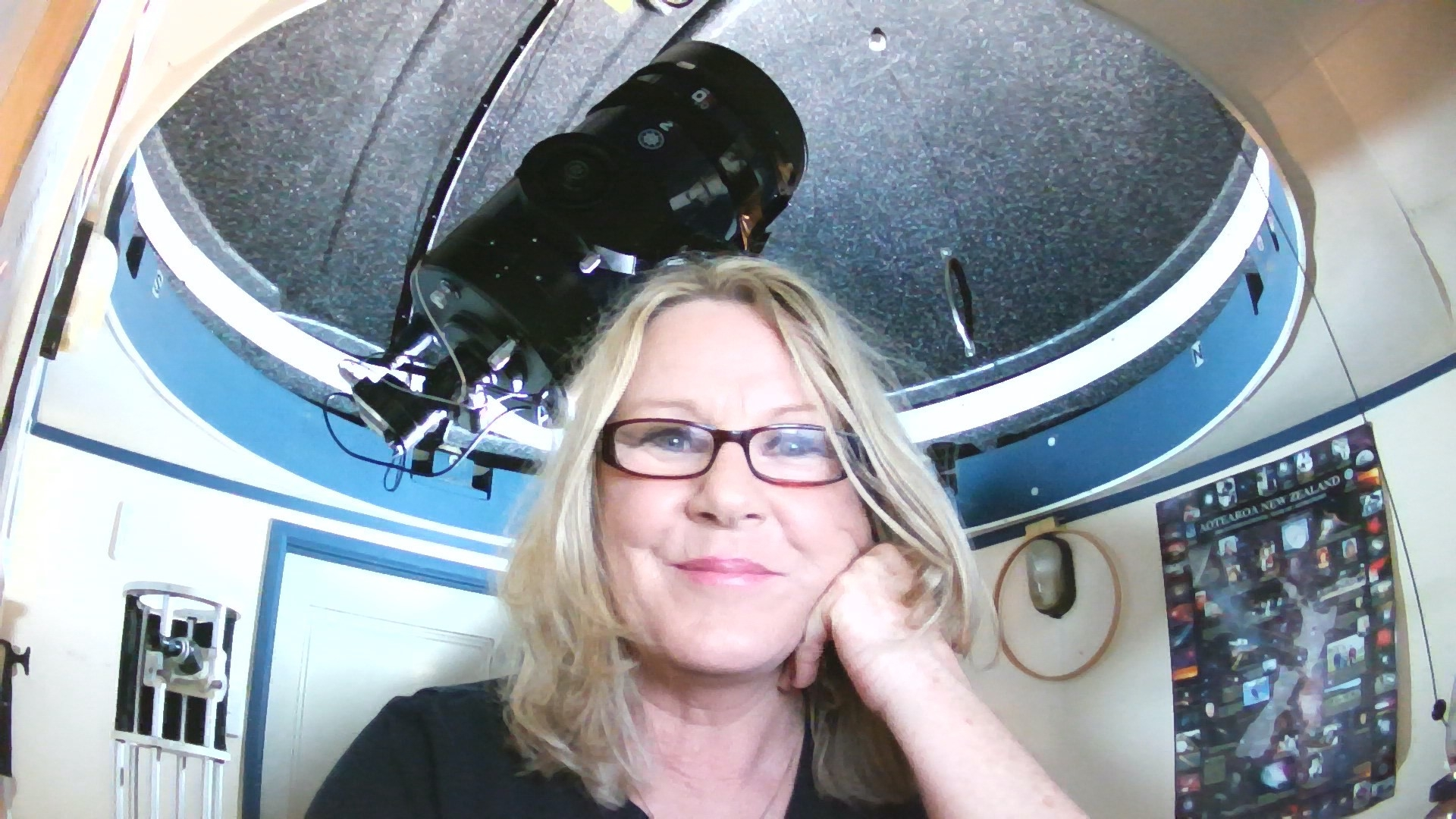
Jennie McCormick in Farm Cove Observatory

Since 2002 she has been the sole proprietor of Farm Cove Observatory, an observatory in Pakuranga, a suburb of Auckland. The observatory has the IAU code E85 and is equipped with a 35 cm Schmidt-Cassegrain telescope. Construction of the observatory began in 1999 and it opened on 14 February 2000. As an astronomer, she has co-discovered ~25 exoplanets since 2015. On 16 September 2009, she discovered inner main belt asteroid 2009 SA1, at Farm Cove Observatory, which she named (386622) New Zealand on 21 May 2016.

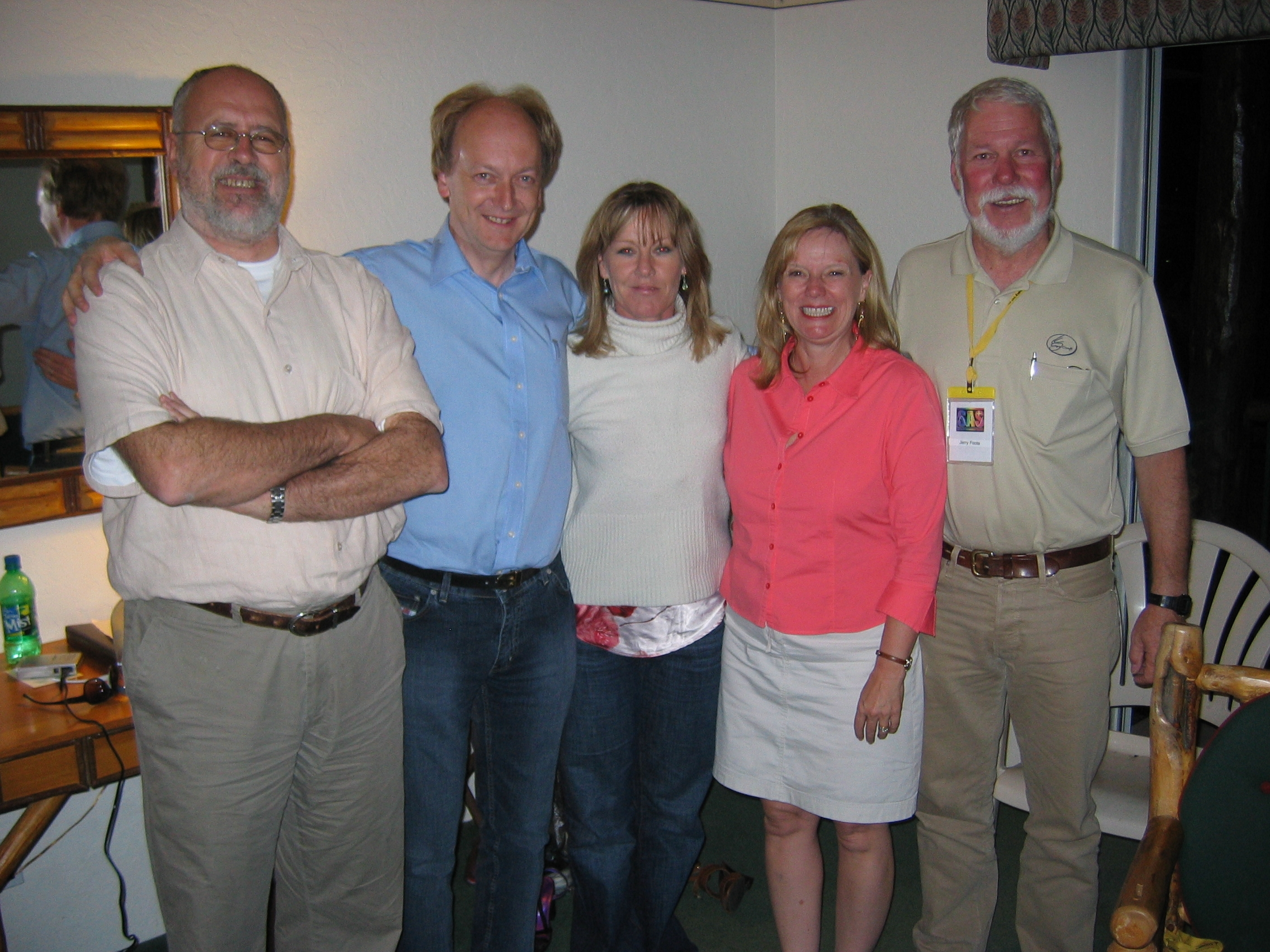
CBA observers meeting at Big Bear Lakes, CA 2006

In early 2000, McCormick became a member of CBA, The Centre for Backyard Astrophysics based at Columbia University. The group is engaged in long term photometeric study of Cataclysmic Variable stars or CV's. Farm Cove Observatory is known as CBA Pakuranga.

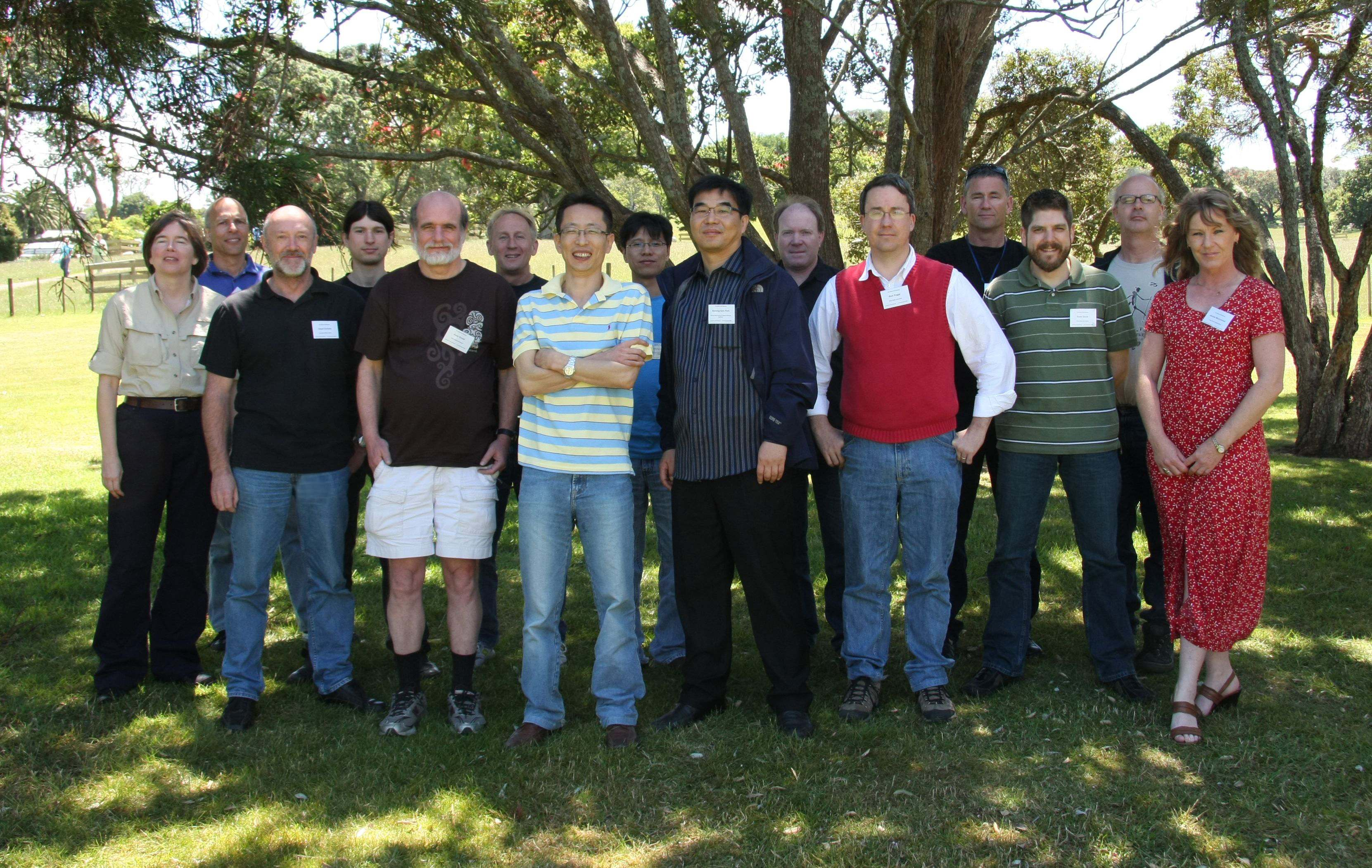
First Microfun team meeting held in Auckland, New Zealand 2008

In 2004 McCormick became part of the MicroFUN Collaboration Microlensing Follow-up Network, a collaboration of observers from five continents, both professional and amateur dedicated to photometric monitoring of microlensing events in the Galactic Bulge. The primary scientific objective of this group is to observe high magnification microlensing events that give the best potential for detecting extra-solar planets. Farm Cove Observatory is known as MicroFun Farm Cove. As part of a 2005 collaborative MicroFUN project McCormick, along with another New Zealand astronomer, Grant Christie, was credited with assisting in getting confirmation of a planet around 15,000 light years away from Earth, thought to be one of the "most distant ever discovered."

== Associations and distinctions ==
McCormick was appointed member of the Auckland Astronomical Society in 1988. She has been a member of the Royal Astronomical Society of New Zealand (RASNZ) since the 1990s, and was made a Fellow (FRASNZ) of the Society in 2016. In 2008/2009 she was the coordinator for the International Year of Astronomy 2009's, 100 Hours of Astronomy, a science outreach event that reached a global audience. She has been a member of Astronomers Without Borders since 2011.

== Status ==
McCormick is usually referred to as an amateur astronomer, a term which Caren Cooper, in her book Citizen Science: How ordinary people are changing the face of discover, noted was a "longstanding, nonderogatory phrase in astronomy...[which requires a person]...to have enormous skill, dedication and expertise." In the book, Cooper interviewed McCormick and discussed the role and contributions of amateur astronomers. While McCormick initially said she wasn't "sensitive about words", in an interview with Cooper, she did pose questions related to the difference between a professional and an amateur in the field. It was noted that McCormick needed her own telescope and computer literacy and concluded that she contributed to making discoveries not only on her own, but also through networks with professionals and other amateurs. McCormick said amateurs produced high quality data more regularly because of good access to their own equipment which allowed the flexibility to negotiate the "whim of the weather...[and manage]...the nonstationary and variable characteristics of the stars...[to make]...contributions that fall through the cracks of the professional approaches to astronomy." McCormick has said that amateurs can observe for longer periods uninterrupted than most professionals and this had particular relevance for New Zealand, because due to its geographic positioning, "the galactic bulge passes almost overhead in Auckland allowing observations to continue uninterrupted through until dawn."

== Selected publications ==
- Superhumps in Cataclysmic Binaries (2005). A paper co-authored by McCormick that described the search for positive superhumps in cataclysmic variables as fractions of the orbital period.
- CCD Photometry from a Small Observatory in a Large City (2006). McCormick was the sole author of this paper that provided details of the work done by the Farm Cove Observatory since 2000 in gathering 1339 hours of data that played a key role in the co-discovery of the Exoplanet, OGLE-2005-BLG-071L.
- Possible tool use by an Australian magpie (Gymnorhina tibicen) (2007). Authored by McCormick, this article reported on manipulation of tools by the Australian magpie and concluded, in spite of there being little previous evidence, [that] "magpies, like many corvoids, manipulate objects in their bills when not nest building ...[and]...therefore [she] interpret[ed] the behaviour described here as potentially the 1st observation of tool use in the Australian magpie."
- The story of Farm Cove Observatory / Jennie McCormick (2014). This book authored by McCormick, documents the history of the Farm Cove Observatory from its conception in the late 1990s and traces all the installation of equipment and involvement of professionals and volunteers to get it fully running by 2000. Several discoveries by McCormick and others at the observatory are documented.
- T Pyxidis: death by a thousand novae (2016). An article in the Monthly Notices of the Royal Astronomical Society, co-authored by McCormick, that recorded a 20-year project to track the photometric and orbital wave of the T Pyxidis nova.
- The Spin-period History of Intermediate Polars (2020) McCormick co-authored this international study that looked at the history of five Intermediate polars since they were discovered.

== Honours and awards ==
In the 2006 Queen's Birthday Honours, McCormick was appointed a Member of the New Zealand Order of Merit, for services to astronomy. She was awarded the Murray Geddes Memorial Prize of the Royal Astronomical Society of New Zealand in 2006. In 2016 she was made a Fellow of the Royal Astronomical Society of New Zealand
