= Copernicus Foundation for Polish Astronomy =

Coordinates: 52°13′00.9″N 21°01′39.2″E

- Fundacja Astronomii Polskiej im. Mikołaja Kopernika
- Founded: May 1990; 36 years ago
- VAT ID no.: NIP: 5260019499
- Registration no.: KRS: 0000091659
- Purpose: support of Polish astronomy
- Headquarters: Al. Ujazdowskie 4, 00-478 Warszawa
- Location: Warsaw, Poland
- Region served: Poland

The Copernicus Foundation for Polish Astronomy (Polish: Fundacja Astronomii Polskiej im. Mikołaja Kopernika) is a Polish scientific foundation which aim is to support Polish astronomy by: financing research, founding stipends, propagation of an astronomical knowledge in the society and activation and stimulation of the astronomical community.

The Copernicus foundation is headquartered in Warsaw, Poland and Prof. Michał Jaroszyński is the chairman of the organization. The Copernicus Foundation is a publisher of an Acta Astronomica - a peer-reviewed scientific journal covering astronomy and astrophysics.

== History ==
The organization was founded in May 1990. The first president was Prof. Marcin Kubiak, and the vice-president - dr hab. Tomasz Chlebowski. Long-term chairman of the Board of the Foundation was Prof. Robert Głębocki (from the beginning till his death in 2005).

== Activity ==
The Foundation is involved in both one-time and recurring activities in accordance to its statute. The notable actions include:

- publishing of peer-reviewed scientific journal Acta Astronomica of international recognition regarding astronomy and astrophysics, which is indexed in Science Citation Index
- financial support of the Astronomical Olympiad in Poland
- support of annual Youth Astronomical Seminar of Poland (Ogólnopolskie Młodzieżowe Seminarium Astronomiczne)
- financial support of the conference of Use of Small Telescopes (Wykorzystanie małych teleskopów), Kraków-Koninki 2013.
- sponsor of the Software Systems for Astronomy - summer school (7-18 July 2014, Poznań, Poland)

The Foundation participated also in the financial support of many issues:

- stipends for best astronomy students (eg. Krzysztof Stanek (1991), Andrzej Kudlicki (1994), Przemysław Woźniak (1995) i Arkadiusz Olech (1996))
- build of the Gamma-ray Bursts detectors by Prof. Lech Mankiewicz (beginnings of the "Pi of the Sky" project).

== See also ==
- List of astronomical societies
