= Whanganui Girls' College =

Location
- Jones Street, Whanganui, Manawatū-Whanganui, New Zealand; 39.91875°S 175.05614339°E

Information
- Funding type: State
- Motto: Ad Astra; Poutamatia
- Established: 1891
- Ministry of Education Institution no.: 188
- Principal: Nita Pond
- Years offered: 9–13
- Gender: Single-sex Secondary School for Girls
- Enrolment: 363 (July 2026)
- Socio-economic decile: 3I
- Website: www.wanganui-girls.school.nz

Whanganui Girls' College is located in Jones Street Whanganui near the Dublin Street Bridge. The school is one of the oldest single sex educational facilities in New Zealand, founded in 1891.

== Enrolment ==
As of July 2026, Whanganui Girls' College has a roll of 363 students, of which 129 (35.5%) identify as Māori.

As of 2026, the school has an Equity Index of 493, placing it amongst schools whose students have above average socioeconomic barriers to achievement (roughly equivalent to decile 4 under the former socio-economic decile system).

== Principals ==
- Mary Isabel Fraser

== Notable alumnae ==
- Jackie Abraham-Lawrie – rower
- Monica Brewster – arts patron and women's rights advocate
- Edith Collier – artist
- Dorothy Davies – pianist
- Ellen France – lawyer and judge
- Patricia France – artist
- Nola Luxford – radio pioneer
- Jennie McCormick – astronomer
- Christine McElwee – politician, historian, author and teacher
- Mina McKenzie – museum director
- Anne Noble – photographer
- Victoria Ransom – entrepreneur
- Ruth Ross – historian
- Gillian Weir – organist
