= Association for Advancing Participatory Sciences =

North American based membership organization promoting citizen science

Citizen Science Association
- Abbreviation: CSA
- Formation: 2013
- Type: 501(c)(3)
- Registration no.: 81-2763794
- Legal status: Charitable Organization
- Fields: Citizen Science
- Interim Executive Director: Dr. Jennifer Shirk
- Board of directors: Shannon Dosemagen (Chair), Alison Young (Vice Chair), Michael Pocock (Secretary), Anne Bowser (Treasurer), Alison Parker, Angel Hjarding, Tina Phillips, Julie Vastine, Caren Cooper, Greg Newman, Lea Shanley, Cat Stylinski, Sarah Kirn, Na'Taki Osborne Jelks
- Affiliations: Schoodic Institute - host organisation, European Citizen Science Association, Australian Citizen Science Association
- Website: participatorysciences.org

The Citizen Science Association (CSA) (now renamed as the Association for Advancing Participatory Sciences) is a United States member-based professional organization for practitioners and researchers of citizen science, where scientific research is conducted, in whole or in part, by amateur or nonprofessional scientists. The Association aims to expand the reach, relevance, and impact of science and research in the United States and internationally. The CSA was founded in 2013 in the United States and was recognized as a charitable organization with a 501c3 designated status in June 2017.

== History ==
The concept for the Citizen Science Association originated at the Public Participation for Scientific Research Conference in 2012 held in conjunction with the Ecological Society of America conference in Portland, Oregon. Through a series of NSF grants (DRL-0610363, DRL-1020909, and DRL-0813135) the network of citizen science projects and professionals was further developed and the Citizen Science Association formation as an official organization developed along with a website. The Cornell Lab of Ornithology hosted the beginning of the Association web content and the Schoodic Institute helped launch the organization and is a continuing fiscal sponsor the CSA.

The CSA was renamed as the Association for Advancing Participatory Sciences in April 2024.

== Conference for Advancing the Participatory Sciences ==
The association holds an annual professional conference called the Conference for Advancing the Participatory Sciences. The conference brings together practitioners and researchers to discuss best practices in citizen science.

== International collaboration ==
The association has a memorandum of understanding for collaboration and coordination with peer organizations in other countries. These include the European Citizen Science Association, the Australian Citizen Science Association, and the developing communities and associations in Asia (CitizenScience.Asia) and Africa. The United Nations officially recognised the Citizen Science Association and is working with the Citizen Science Global Partnership on how citizen science can best be applied to help tackle the Sustainable Development Goals.

== Citizen Science: Theory and Practice journal ==
The association has an online, open-access, peer-reviewed journal called Citizen Science: Theory and Practice published by Ubiquity Press. The journal provides a venue for researchers and practitioners to share best practices in conceiving, developing, implementing, evaluating, and sustaining projects that facilitate public participation in scientific endeavors in any discipline. The journal publishes research reports, reviews and synthesis, case studies, essays, methods, and meeting reports.

== Working groups ==
The association’s working groups focus on priority areas of the science and practice of citizen science. As of February 2020 the following nine working groups have formed.

1. Citizen Science Month
2. Data and Metadata
3. Education
4. Ethics
5. Environmental Justice Practitioners
6. Integrity, Diversity, and Equity
7. Law and Policy
8. Professional Development
9. Research and Evaluation

== See also ==
List of citizen science projects
