= Korotangi =

The Korotangi (bird of sorrow) is a taonga or sacred artifact discovered in New Zealand. It is a carving of a bird made in serpentine stone. Some Māori of Tainui allegiance believe that it was brought to the country from Hawaiki in their ancestral waka, but it is carved with metal tools, which the Polynesians did not have. It has no similarity to any other manufactured piece in Oceania. Its origin is a mystery.

== Physical description ==
The stone is a non-specific serpentine, weighs 2,097 g (4.623 lb), is 26 cm (10 in) long and appears to be carved with metal tools. It depicts a bird which seems to be a fusion of a petrel (possibly a broad-billed prion (pararā)), a duck, and a dove or pigeon.

== History ==
The statue was discovered among the roots of a mānuka tree blown over in a storm in 1878. The location was near Aotea Harbour, traditional landing place of the Tainui waka (c. 1350). This was the story of its finding given at the time by Mr. Albert Walker, who claimed it was found by a local Māori, although there are other versions. He offered it for sale to a local Cambridge antique and ethnographic dealer, Major Drummond-Hay. It was then purchased by Major John Wilson, as a present to his Māori wife, Te Aorere, for 50 pounds. It is claimed that the carving was referred to in a number of poems or laments about its loss, and that several chiefs were extremely moved by its rediscovery.

The Wilson family later deposited the carving with Dominion Museum. By 1995 it was kept at its successor, Te Papa, from where it was returned to Tainui by Prime Minister Jim Bolger as part of the government's settlement of their claims under the treaty of Waitangi. The Wilson family apparently disputes the government's authority to done so.

Tūheitia Paki, the Māori King from 2006 to 2024, named his second child Korotangi.

== Bibliography ==
- Wilson, John (1889). "On the Korotangi, or Stone Bird". Transactions and Proceedings of the Royal Society of New Zealand. 22: 499–508.
- von Haast, Julius (1881). "A few Remarks on the Carved Stone Bird, named Korotangi by the Maoris, now in the possession of Major Wilson". Transactions and Proceedings of the Royal Society of New Zealand. National Library of New Zealand: 104–105.
- Graham, George (1917). "The legend of the Korotangi". Journal of the Polynesian Society. 26 (3): 138–140.
- Editors (1929). "Notes on the Korotangi or Stone Bird". The Journal of the Polynesian Society. 38. Auckland University: 55–59.
- Phillipps, W. J. (September 1955). "Korotangi". TE AO HOU the New World (1955): 36–37.
- McKay, Christine (1978). The Korotangi. Wellington: Dominion Museum monograph.
