= Taonga =

Treasured possession in the Māori culture of New Zealand

Taonga or taoka (in South Island Māori) is a Māori-language word that refers to a treasured possession in Māori culture. It lacks a direct translation into English, making its use in the Treaty of Waitangi significant. The current definition differs from the historical one, noted by Hongi Hika as "property procured by the spear" [one could understand this as war booty or defended property] and is now interpreted to mean a wide range of both tangible and intangible possessions, especially items of historical cultural significance. The 1820 Grammar and Vocabulary of the Language of New Zealand by Cambridge University professor Samuel Lee defined taonga as property procured by the spear. The second dictionary, was the Dictionary of the New Zealand Language by William Williams, published in 1844 four years after treaty was signed. This simply defined taonga as property.

Tangible examples are all sorts of heirlooms and artefacts, land, fisheries, natural resources such as geothermal springs and access to natural resources, such as riparian water rights and access to the riparian zone of rivers or streams. Intangible examples may include language and spiritual beliefs. The concept of taonga can also transcend into general New Zealand culture and non-Māori items; for example, the Ranfurly Shield is recognised as a taonga amongst the New Zealand rugby community.

Traditionally taonga represent the tangible and intangible links between Māori people and their ancestors and land. Taonga serve to reaffirm these genealogical connections to people and place known as whakapapa. Taonga serve as genealogical reference markers that help connect the living with their past. The intangible elements of taonga, such as the stories and genealogy that accompany them, are just as important as the object itself. Mina McKenzie described maintaining the connections between tangible objects, intangible properties, place and descendants as 'keeping the taonga warm.'

What is deemed to be a taonga has major political, economic and social consequences in New Zealand and has been the subject of fierce debates as the varying definitions and interpretations have implications for policies regarding such things as intellectual property, genetic engineering and allocation of radio frequency spectrum.

== Relationships ==
Fundamental to taonga are the relationships they exist in, including the people that made or cared for them, the communities they came from, and the ways they are connected to specific aspects of Maori culture.

== Treaty of Waitangi and te Tiriti o Waitangi ==
The definition of taonga has potential constitutional significance in New Zealand because of the use of the word in the second article of the Treaty of Waitangi (Māori: te Tiriti o Waitangi). The English-language version of the treaty guaranteed the Māori signatories "full exclusive and undisturbed possession of their Lands and Estates Forests Fisheries and other properties". The Māori-language version of the treaty, which the vast majority of the signing parties endorsed (461 of 500 signatures), used the word taonga to translate the English phrase "other properties".

Section 6(e) of the Resource Management Act 1991 mandates decision-makers to "recognise and provide for the relationship of Māori and their culture and traditions with their ancestral lands, water, sites, wāhi tapu [sacred sites], and other taonga" as a matter of national importance.

== Artefacts ==
Te Uenuku, or simply Uenuku, is an important early Māori carving housed at Te Awamutu Museum. Te Uenuku (literally "The rainbow") represents the tribal god Uenuku.

Korotangi (bird of sorrow) is a carving of a bird made in serpentine stone. Some Māori of Tainui allegiance believe that it was brought to the country from Hawaiki in their ancestral waka.

== Waitangi Tribunal claims ==
A number of claims have been made to the Waitangi Tribunal, relating to the protection of taonga.

=== Māori language ===
In June 1985 a claim was lodged asking that the Māori language receive official recognition. It was proposed that the language be official for all purposes enabling its use as of right in Parliament, the Courts, Government Departments, local authorities and public bodies.

=== Radio frequencies ===
In June 1986, the Waitangi Tribunal received the Wai 26 claim that the Treaty of Waitangi was breached by the Crown proceeding to introduce legislation related to Māori language before the delivery of the Tribunal's "Report on the Te Reo Maori Claim", and as a consequence, the Māori people would be denied their claims for radio frequencies and a television channel. In June 1990 claim Wai 150 was lodged by Sir Graham Latimer on behalf of the New Zealand Maori Council. The claim was in respect of their rangatiratanga over the allocation of radio frequencies; the claim being that in the absence of an agreement with the Māori, the sale of frequency management licences under the Radiocommunications Act 1989 would be in breach of the Treaty of Waitangi. The Waitangi Tribunal amalgamated the Wai 26 with the Wai 150 claim, with the final report of the Tribunal recommending that the Crown suspend the radio frequency tender process and proceed to negotiate with the iwi.

=== Spiritual places and burial sites ===
In November 1996, various members of Te Roroa filed a claim with the Waitangi Tribunal concerning the Maunganui block, the Waipoua Forest, Lake Taharoa and surroundings, and the Waimamaku Valley in Northland. A part of the Wai 38 claim related to taonga, in particular: wahi tapu "spiritual places of special significance to tangata whenua", and wakatupapaku (burial chests deposited in ana (caves and crevices)).

The Tribunal report delivered on 3 April 1992 found that the Crown had allowed Te Roroa's taonga to be violated.

=== Māori knowledge of flora and fauna ===
The Wai 262 claim in the Waitangi Tribunal is a claim of rights in respect of Mātauranga Māori or Māori knowledge in respect of indigenous flora and fauna. The claimants commissioned a report from D. Williams on traditional ecological knowledge, ethnobotany and international and New Zealand law on intellectual property and conservation.

On 2 July 2011 the Tribunal released its report into the Wai 262 claim: "Ko Aotearoa Tēnei" ('This is Aotearoa' or 'This is New Zealand'). "Ko Aotearoa Tēnei" considers more than 20 Government departments and agencies and makes recommendations as to reforms of "laws, policies or practices relating to health, education, science, intellectual property, indigenous flora and fauna, resource management, conservation, the Māori language, arts and culture, heritage, and the involvement of Māori in the development of New Zealand's positions on international instruments affecting indigenous rights." The First Chapter of volume 1 (of the full 2 volume report) considers the relationship between taonga works and intellectual property. The Tribunal provides a working definition of a 'taonga work' as being that:

"A taonga work is a work, whether or not it has been fixed, that is in its entirety an expression of mātauranga Māori; it will relate to or invoke ancestral connections, and contain or reflect traditional narratives or stories. A taonga work will possess mauri and have living kaitiaki in accordance with tikanga Māori." (Vol 1, 1.7.3 p. 96)

These working definitions involve concepts which are described by the Tribunal as being: Mauri is having a living essence or spirit. Kaitiaki can be spiritual guardians that exist in non-human form; kaitiaki obligations also exist in the human realm. The related concept is that "Kaitiakitanga is the obligation, arising from the kin relationship, to nurture or care for a person or thing it has a spiritual aspect, encompassing not only an obligation to care for and nurture not only physical well-being but also mauri." Kaitiaki obligations are described by the Tribunal as being that, “those who have mana (or, to use treaty terminology, rangatiratanga) must exercise it in accordance with the values of kaitiakitanga – to act unselfishly, with right mind and heart, and with proper Mana and kaitiakitanga go together as right and responsibility, and that kaitiakitanga responsibility can be understood not only as a cultural principle but as a system of law”. The Tribunal also provide a working definition of a 'taonga-derived work' as being that:

"A taonga-derived work is a work that derives its inspiration from mātauranga Māori or a taonga work, but does not relate to or invoke ancestral connections, nor contain or reflect traditional narratives or stories, in any direct way. A taonga-derived work is identifiably Māori in nature or contains identifiably Māori elements, but has neither mauri nor living kaitiaki in accordance with tikanga Māori." (Vol 1, 1.7.3 p. 96)

The Tribunal considered which principles applied to whether consent to its use, rather than mere consultation, was necessary where the work was a taonga work, or where the knowledge or information was mātauranga Māori.

== Modern usage ==
The word taonga is often used in the Māori names of institutions and organisations that manage historical collections. Many New Zealand museums contain the term Whare taonga ("treasure house") in the name. Here are some examples:

English name	Māori name
Hocken Collections, Dunedin	Uare Taoka o Hākena (the Southern Māori dialect form of Whare Taonga)
Ministry for Culture and Heritage	Te Manatū Taonga
New Zealand Historic Places Trust	Pouhere Taonga
New Zealand Film Archive	Ngā Kaitiaki O Ngā Taonga Whitiāhua
Radio New Zealand Sound Archives	Ngā Taonga Kōrero
Rotorua Museum	Te Whare Taonga O Te Arawa
Waikato Museum	Te Whare Taonga o Waikato
