= Mina McKenzie =

New Zealand museum director (1930–1997)

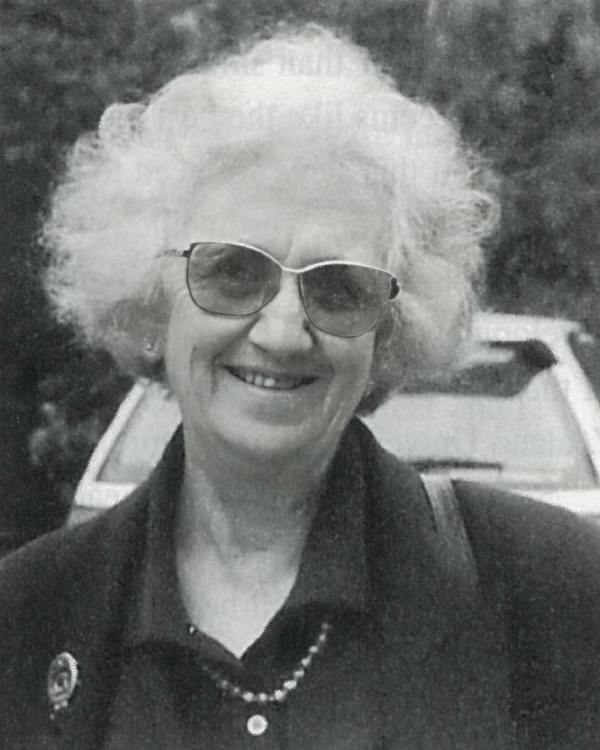
- Born: Mina Louise Gillespie; 2 February 1930; Palmerston North, New Zealand
- Died: 11 March 1997 (aged 67)
- Other name: Mina Woods
- Education: Wanganui Girls' College
- Alma mater: University of Otago; Massey University
- Occupations: Museum curator and director
- Employer: Manawatu Museum
- Known for: First Māori director of a New Zealand museum
- Spouses: Barry James Woods (m. 1952; div. 1963); Bruce Alan McKenze (m. 1965)
- Children: 6

Mina Louise McKenzie (née Gillespie; 2 February 1930 – 11 March 1997) was a New Zealand museum director based in Palmerston North. Known to many as "Aunty Mina", she was the curator at the Manawatū Museum (later Te Manawa) between June 1974 and 1978. From 1978 until her retirement in 1994, she served as the director of Manawatū Museum. Affiliating to Ngāti Hauiti, Ngāti Raukawa, Te Āti Haunui a Pāpārangi, and Rangitāne, she was the first Māori director of a New Zealand museum.

== Early life, family and education ==
McKenzie was born in Palmerston North on 2 February 1930. She was educated at Wanganui Girls' College, and went on to study zoology, geology and chemistry at the University of Otago between 1948 and 1950. In 1963, she enrolled in arts papers at Massey University.

In 1952, she married Barry James Woods, and the couple had two children before divorcing. In 1965, she married Bruce Alan McKenzie, and they had four children together.

== Career ==
McKenzie returned to Palmerston North in 1952. She worked briefly for the Department of Māori Affairs (forerunner of Te Puni Kōkiri) and co-founded a Manawatū branch of the Māori Women's Welfare League in 1953. In 1967 a Manawatū museum society was incorporated. In 1971, along with other volunteers, McKenzie and her husband Bruce worked to set up Palmerston North's first museum in an old house offered by the Palmerston North City Council. She was appointed acting curator in 1974. This new position came with a small honorarium. Her curator role became a full-time position when the museum moved to larger premises in 1975. In 1978 she was appointed as Manawatū Museum’s first director. She was known colloquially to many as "Aunty Mina". She was the first Māori to hold such a position in New Zealand. In addition to her work at the Manawatū Museum, she was involved in national museum movements, committees and projects, until she retired in 1994.

== Legacy ==
When McKenzie was appointed director of the Manawatū Museum in 1978 she engaged local Iwi (Māori: tribe) as kaitiaki (Māori: guardians) of the museum. Contrary to prevailing museum practices of the time she pursued a philosophy of 'keeping the taonga (Māori: sacred objects) warm.' This approach facilitated access for source communities to the museum collections including touching and wearing items of significance. By 1980 McKenzie had already established herself as an advocate for a new kind of bi-cultural museological practice.

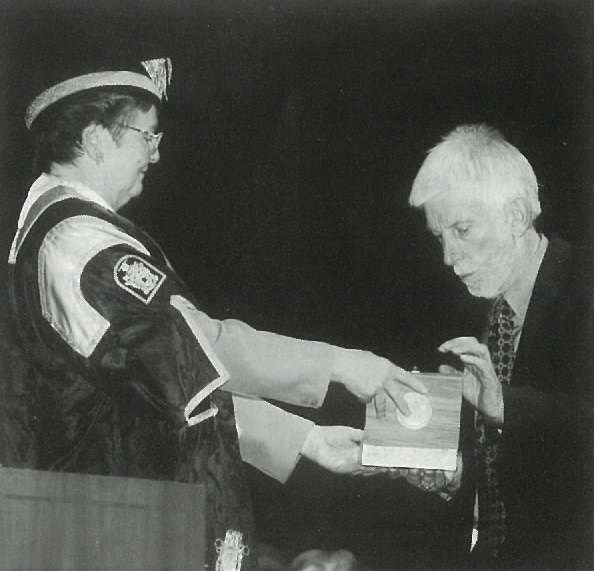
Bruce McKenzie receives the Massey University Medal awarded posthumously to Mina McKenzie from the university chancellor, Morva Croxson, at a graduation ceremony at the Regent Theatre, Palmerston North, in May 1998

McKenzie was a member of the Te Maori committee. She was instrumental in having the North American tour extended to the Field Museum in Chicago. The Te Maori exhibition is credited with generating new ways of exhibiting and understanding Māori taonga within museum contexts. McKenzie was the only woman on the Te Maori committee and the museum she was director of was not asked to contribute any collection items to the exhibition. This enabled her to work in a mediator role, as both a Māori and a museum professional. She facilitated negotiations between Iwi and museums to gain the necessary permissions to allow taonga to travel to America.

McKenzie was a mentor to many young people who went on to become prominent museum and heritage professionals and scholars in New Zealand. Throughout the 1980s, she utilised funding from government work schemes to employ students and Māori and train them in museum practice. McKenzie was instrumental in the establishment of a museum studies programme at Massey University, where she was an honorary associate professor from 1990 until her death in 1997.

== Awards and honours ==
In 1990, McKenzie was awarded the New Zealand 1990 Commemoration Medal, and she received the Palmerston North Civic Honour Award in 1993.

After McKenzie's death in 1997, the Mina McKenzie Scholarship and annual Mina McKenzie Lecture were established. In 1998, she was posthumously awarded the Massey University Medal for contributions to the university's museum studies programme and strengthening of the museum sector in New Zealand. In 2018, the Mina McKenzie Award was introduced at the New Zealand Museum Awards, recognising individual achievements in the museum sector.
