= Caren Cooper =

Scholar, author, and citizen science advocate

- Occupations: Scientist, professor, writer

Academic background
- Education: University of Wyoming BA, MA; Virginia Tech Ph.d

External videos
- "Citizen Science: Everybody Counts"

Caren Beth Cooper is an American professor and scholar at North Carolina State University, citizen science advocate, and author of two books on citizen science. Her doctoral dissertation addressed the effects of habitat fragmentation on the Australian passerine. Her scientific publications concentrate primarily on ornithology as well as citizen science contributions to science and diversity, equity, and inclusion in underserved communities.

== Biography ==
Cooper was born in New York and grew up in multiple locations in the South, including Chapel Hill, North Carolina. There, she developed an interest in animals, particularly birds. She decided against a career in veterinary medicine and instead chose field studies.

In 2007-2008, Cooper served as chair of Kol Haverim, the Finger Lakes Community for Humanistic Judaism in Ithaca, New York.

== Education ==
Cooper received a Bachelor of Science degree in zoology in 1988; a Master's in zoology and physiology from the University of Wyoming in 1993, and a PhD from Virginia Tech in 2000. She also spent 13 years conducting research and advancing citizen science at the Cornell Lab of Ornithology.

== Career ==
=== Academic career ===
Since January 2019, Cooper has worked at North Carolina State University, where she is an associate professor in Forestry and Environmental Resources. She is a University Faculty Scholar, and is a member of the Chancellor's Faculty Excellence Cluster for Leadership in Public Science. Much of her work is dedicated to developing public science programs that focus volunteers on generating "large-scale data to study and visualize the interactions between social and ecological systems." She emphasizes equity, diversity, and inclusion in her efforts to educate the public about citizen science. Cooper coauthored a paper in the journal Science that explored these themes in more detail. The paper subsequently led to National Science Foundation funding of A Conference on Equity, Diversity, and Inclusion in Citizen Science, an ongoing program to be conducted between September 15, 2021 and August 31, 2022.

During her time at NC State, Cooper has become faculty advisor to the university's first citizen science club. She also helped design the NestWatch, Celebrate Urban Birds, and YardMap citizen science projects for the Cornell Lab of Ornithology. She contributed to and helps lead a successful $300,000 National Science Foundation grant to build citizen science capacity at underserved communities with the goal of improving public health and well-being.

She served as assistant director of the Biodiversity Research Lab at the North Carolina Museum of Natural Sciences. In 2011, she became a Senior Fellow for the Environmental Leadership Program (ELP).

=== Guest lecturing ===
In 2020, Cooper gave the British Trust for Ornithology's Witherby Memorial Lecture. On March 17, 2018, she gave the Paul F-Brandwein Lecture at the National Science Teachers Association Annual Meeting in Atlanta. She presented a lecture at the American Association for the Advancement of Science (AAAS) annual meeting in Chicago in 2014, where she discussed how citizen science and contribute to political improvements.

=== Writings ===
In 2016, Cooper published the book Citizen Science: How Ordinary People are Changing the Face of Discovery, which discussed the roles, impact, and potential of citizen science. In 2020, she coauthored The Field Guide to Citizen Science: How You Can Contribute to Scientific Research and Make a Difference with Darlene Cavalier and Catherine Hoffman, which discusses ways that individuals can get involved in citizen science.

From 2012 to 2016, she wrote a guest blog for Scientific American, discussing the need to incorporate citizen inputs into scientific practices, policy, and activism. Cooper is one of the founding editors-in-chief for online journal Citizen Science Theory and Practice, a peer-reviewed, scholarly journal sponsored by the Citizen Science Association that focuses on the practices and outcomes generated by citizen science. She currently serves as the journal's Special Collections Associate Editor. She has also contributed papers to PLOS One.

She also wrote as a blogger for Discover Magazine.

=== Organisational affiliations ===
Cooper is co-chair of the International Science Council's Committee on Data (CODATA) task group on citizen science, known as Citizen Science and the Validation, Curation, and Management of Crowdsourced Data (with WDS).

=== Other projects ===
As a principal investigator, Cooper has led multiple projects with citizen science inputs. She heads the CrowdTheTap project, which is an EPA-funded effort to promote access to safe drinking water by helping individuals and groups investigate pipe materials delivering drinking water to homes. Educators and private citizens input and access data through the project's website[Ibid.] or SciStarter.org. She also serves as the P.I. for Sound Around Town, a citizen science project designed to study noise levels in urban environments and how they affect people. The project supports the National Park Service's National Sound Map. Additionally, she leads the SparrowSwap project, which collects and studies house sparrow eggs; house sparrows are a non-native, invasive species.

=== Media appearances ===
Cooper has been interviewed many times on the subject of citizen science. These interviews include Yale Environment 360 and Science Friday; the "How on Earth" radio program on KGNU radio in Boulder, Colorado; the Association of Science and Technology Centers' ASTC On Air online program the "Speaking of Science" online radio program; The Science Show with Robyn Williams presented by the Australian Broadcasting Corporation; the Sierra Club's magazine Sierra; and the online educational program Lab Out Loud. In addition, she was profiled by Animal Behavior Associates, Inc.'s online "Chat with CAABS."
