= Australian Citizen Science Association =

Australian based membership organization promoting citizen science

The Australian Citizen Science Association (ACSA) is a membership-based organisation that promotes public participation in science and research projects in Australia and internationally. The organisation provides a range of knowledge sharing, networking, professional development, advocacy and promotional opportunities for members and the community to participate in citizen science. The Association operates nationally as well as through five state-based chapters.

ACSA is an incorporated association registered with the Australian Charities and Not-for-profits Commission in 2018.

== Activities ==
The Association supports a range of activities including a national conference held every two years, workshops and training, bioblitz campaigns, a small grants program, public outreach and education, and collaboration with national and international organisations.

The Association has a memorandum of understanding with other citizen science organisations including the US Citizen Science Association, the European Citizen Science Association, Citizen Science Asia and CitSci Africa Association. The ACSA is a member of the Citizen Science Global Partnership.
