= Na'Taki Osborne Jelks =

American environmental scientist

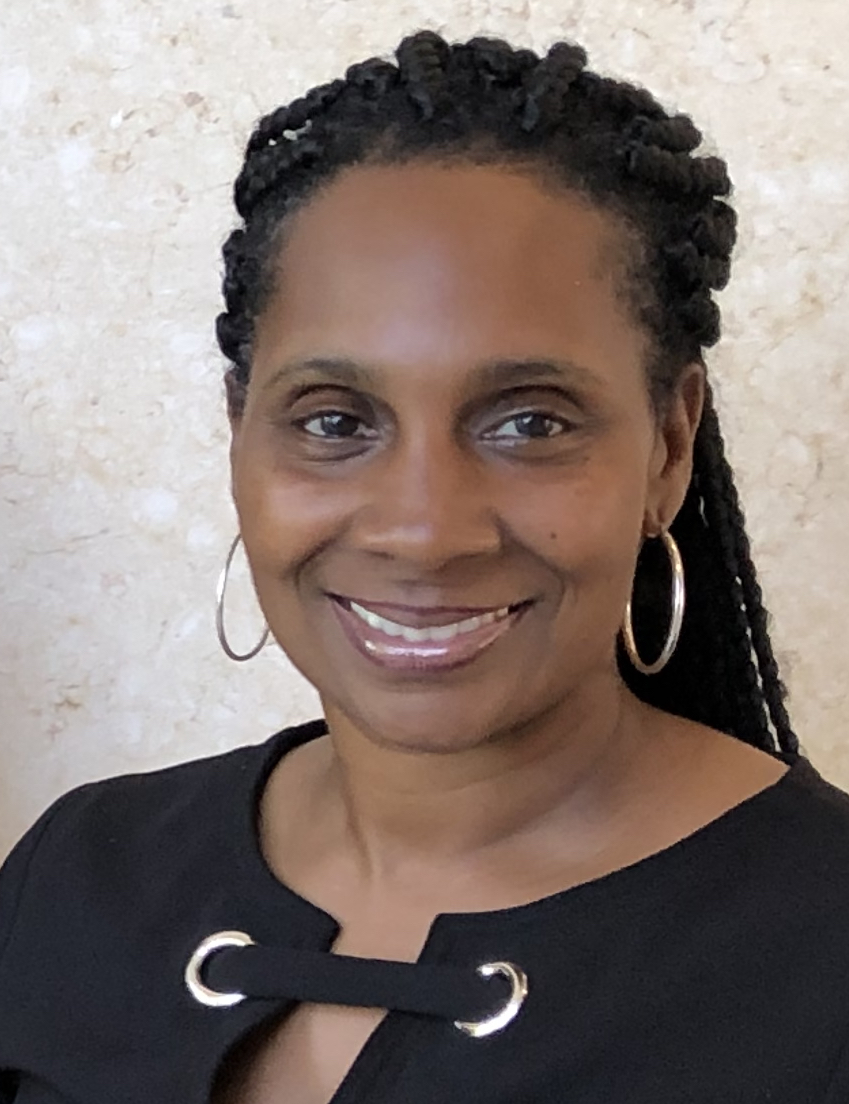
- Na'Taki Osborne Jelks, July 2019.
- Born: Walnut Grove, Mississippi, US
- Education: Spelman College (BS); Emory University (MS); Georgia State University (PhD)
- Awards: Champion of Change (2014)
- Scientific career
- Fields: Environmental justice, urban watersheds, environmental youth education
- Workplaces: Spelman College
- Thesis: Combined Environmental and Social Stressors in Northwest Atlanta's Proctor Creek Watershed: An Exploration of Expert Data and Local Knowledge (2016)
- Doctoral advisor: Christine Stauber

Na'Taki Osborne Jelks is an American environmental scientist. She is an assistant professor of environmental and health sciences at Spelman College, and a visiting professor of public health at Agnes Scott College. She is known for her activism in environmental justice and urban sustainability, for which she was named a Champion of Change by the White House in 2014.

== Education and career ==
Jelks was born in Walnut Grove, Mississippi; her family later moved to Baton Rouge, Louisiana. She received her BS from Spelman College, her master's of public health in environmental and occupational health from Emory University, and her PhD from the School of Public Health at Georgia State University. Her PhD was awarded in 2016, for a thesis titled Combined Environmental and Social Stressors in Northwest Atlanta's Proctor Creek Watershed: An Exploration of Expert Data and Local Knowledge. Jelk's doctoral advisor was Christine Stauber. Her scholarship is focused on community engagement to identify environmental stressors in urban watersheds.

== Environmental justice leadership ==
In 2001, Jelks co-founded the Atlanta Earth Tomorrow® Program, a National Wildlife Federation program that connects urban youth to nature, civic engagement, and leadership development.

She is the board chairperson for the West Atlanta Watershed Alliance, an organization that she helped found.

She is the co-chair of the Proctor Creek Stewardship Council, a grassroots organization focused on restoring the ecological health of the Proctor Creek Watershed in west Atlanta.

She serves on the Boards of Directors of the Citizen Science Association.

In 2018, Jelks was named a member of the U.S. Environmental Protection Agency’s National Environmental Justice Advisory Committee (NEJAC). She is also the manager for Community and Leadership Development Programs for the National Wildlife Federation.

Jelks' environmental activism has been featured in People and The New York Times.

== Awards and honors ==
- 2014: White House Champions of Change
