= Patricia France =

New Zealand artist (1911–1995)

- Born: 29 May 1911; Stratford, New Zealand
- Died: 8 March 1995 (aged 83); Dunedin
- Education: New York School of Interior Design
- Known for: Abstract portraits and patronage of young artists
- Notable work: Mes Tantes, The Girl in the Summer Hat

Mes Tantes on book cover of Painting Out the Past

Patricia France (29 May 1911 – 8 March 1995) was a New Zealand abstract artist. She took up painting in her mid-fifties as part of counselling and art therapy at a private psychiatric hospital in Dunedin. Her works became in demand in all leading New Zealand private and public galleries. She was noted for her unique, unmistakable paintings, as well as her independent charm and quiet flair. In September 2022, one of her oil paintings, Figures in Landscape, sold at auction for NZ$16,730.

== Biography ==
=== Early life ===
France was the only child of William Goldie Cave and Mabel France. Her mother's well-to-do Auckland family came out from Great Britain on the Amelia Thompson in 1841. Her father was an English remittance man who had been sent out to New Zealand by his gentry family in the hope he would make his fortune. France grew up in Stratford, a small town in Taranaki, and later Wanganui and Nelson.

France adored her father, but this changed when she was eight and her parents' marriage failed. Her father deserted his wife and daughter, either by death or abandonment. It is inconclusive.

In those days, a failed marriage carried a social stigma and it may have been convenient to pretend that he had died rather than admitting that he had deserted his family

— Donald, Richard (2008). Painting out the Past: the life and art of Patricia France. Dunedin, NZ: Longacre Press. p. 10. ISBN 978-1-877361-76-0.

After her father's "death", she and her mother lived with her grandmother and aunt in Auckland. She attended the Auckland Diocesan School for Girls, Nelson College for Girls and Wanganui Girls' College, and left school vivacious, intelligent and feminine.

She had thought of going to university to become a doctor, but her mother and aunts had other ideas. In those days, it was unthinkable that well-bred young woman should work. Her role was to have children and attend to her husband, helping his to succeed in society

— Donald, Richard (2008). Painting out the Past: the life and art of Patricia France. Dunedin, NZ: Longacre Press. p. 12. ISBN 978-1-877361-76-0.

Chaperoned by her mother and aunt, she made a grand tour of Europe and studied for two years at a branch of the New York School of Interior Design in Paris. On their return in 1931, they lived in Remuera, a fashionable Auckland superb, albeit with little money.

=== Mid life ===
During World War II, France did social work at the St John Voluntary Aid at the Ellerslie Racecourse Military Hospital. After the war, she nursed her grandmother and mother who had developed dementia. In time, the constraints of being a dutiful daughter and granddaughter, compounded by lack of money and society's rigid expectations, led to a breakdown, and from the ages of 48 to 55, she boarded voluntarily at a private psychiatric hospital in Dunedin, named Ashburn Hall.

A psychiatrist at the hospital, Dr Kenneth Bragan, noted similarities between the mental state of France and writer Janet Frame. Like Frame, she narrowly avoided a pre-frontal lobotomy, and made a slow, often painful, recovery through exploring her creativity. By learning to paint, she overcame her upbringing by 'painting out the past'.

Ian Clothier from the Gallery Art Akaroa speaks of France's "compelling desire to exhibit humanity as it is".

=== Artistic career ===
"Cured" her depression through art therapy, she returned to society in 1966 and, with her inheritance, purchased a wooden villa at 396 Highgate, Dunedin. She started a career as an abstract painter and art connoisseur. Over time, her watercolour, gouache and oil paintings gained the respect and friendship of the dealer Murdoch MacLennan, and artists such as Colin McCahon and Ralph Hotere. She was accepted into the Dunedin art world, and became friends with poet Brian Turner as well as sculptors, theatre directors and actors.

In May 1977, an exhibition of seventeen works at the Bosshard Galleries launched her as a professional artist, at the age of almost 66. Another exhibition followed shortly after at the Barry Lett Gallery, in November 1978, and, despite her lack of formal qualification, she became recognised as a remarkable and highly individual painter. By 1992, the Wellington's Brooker Gallery were selling her works for NZ$4,000.

Her favourite themes were opulent flower and groups of women who don't appear to like one another.

Adept choice of colour suffuses form with a sparkling depth of emotional warmth and coolness. Minimal use of line sharpens her images, frequently of women or girls in generalised landscapes.

— Cain, Stephen (25 October 1993). "Powerful, evocative painting". The Evening Post.

There's a haunting power in each work, as if France was trying to exorcise the hungry ghosts which had devoured so much of her life.

— Christopher Moore, Banishing the demons, The Press

=== Legacy ===
Although, unwell and with failing eyesight, she continued to exhibit and be a patron to young artists until she died at the age of 83, leaving a sizable estate and NZ$390,000 to the Patricia France Charitable Trust for victims of domestic violence. She had little interest in money for its own sake and was concerned about women and children subjected to domestic violence.

== Exhibitions ==
This list is incomplete; you can help by expanding it.

- 1977: Bosshard Galleries, Dunedin
- 1978 and 1980: 'Patricia France Paintings', Barry Lett Galleries, Auckland
- 1984 and 1985: Dennis Cohen Gallery
- 1987: 'Five Woman', Carnegie Gallery
- 1987, 1992 1993 and 1994: Brooker Gallery, Wellington
- 1989: 'Woman Artists Respond', Marshall Seifert Gallery, Dunedin
- 1991: 'Vive la France', The Akaroa Gallery, Akaroa
- 1993: Bowerman Gallery
- 1993: Dobson Bashford Gallery, Christchurch
- 1994: 'We're still here: a celebration of achievement', Milford Galleries, Dunedin
- undated: RKS Art, Auckland

== Collections ==
- Bank of New Zealand, Wellington (In September 2022, BNZ sold the majority of this art collection, with the proceeds of the sale going towards a new charitable BNZ Foundation)
- Fletcher Challenge, Wellington
- Hocken Collections, Dunedin
- Forrester Gallery, Oamaru
- Lincoln University Art Collection, Lincoln
- Museum of New Zealand Te Papa Tongarewa, Wellington
- National Art Gallery, Wellington
- National Library Collection, Christchurch

== Book covers ==
- Alison Gray, Mothers & Daughters, Bridget Williams Books, Wellington, 1993
- Philip Mincher, All the Wild Summer, John McIndoe, Dunedin, 1985
