= European Citizen Science Association =

Citizen science organization

- Abbreviation: ECSA
- Formation: 2014
- VAT ID no.: DE262426477
- Legal status: Charitable Organization
- Headquarters: Museum für Naturkunde Berlin
- Location: Invalidenstraße 43, D-10115 Berlin
- Coordinates: 52°31′48″N 13°22′46″E
- Fields: Citizen Science
- Executive Chair: Prof. Johannes Vogel, PhD
- Executive Vice-Chair: Muki (Mordechai) Haklay
- Executive Vice-Chair: Luigi Ceccaroni
- Board of directors: Dorte Riemenschneider (Managing Director)
- Affiliations: Citizen Science Association, Australian Citizen Science Association
- Website: ecsa.citizen-science.net

The European Citizen Science Association (ECSA) is a membership based networking organization for practitioners and researchers of citizen science in Europe. ECSA was founded in 2014 in Germany and is registered as a charitable and member-based professional organization.

== History ==
ECSA was launched in 2013.

ECSA has a board of directors, elected by its members, and a collection of professional working groups that establish standards, identify best practices, help to focus research and technology, and explore the ethics of citizen science. In addition, it has an advisory board and a steering committee, which support the executive board.

== Activities ==
It has held general assemblies each year since 2014, at which ECSA members and working groups present their initiatives and discuss how the organization’s vision can be further developed.

The first biannual international ECSA conference was held in Berlin in May 2016.

ECSA has initiated several strategic capacity-building programmes at the European and national scale, which have led to the development of outputs such as the Socientize Green and White Papers on Citizen Science in Europe and the Green paper Citizen Science Strategy 2020 for Germany. The European White Paper provided the basis for several actions and policies related to public engagement in science directed by the European Commission, such as the "Science with and for Society" programme 2018-2020.

ECSA is an active consortium member in several projects funded by the European Commission’s Horizon 2020. These include:

- Distributed Network for Odour Sensing, Empowerment and Sustainability (D-NOSES).
- Doing It Together Science (DITOs). (This project has now ended).
- EU-Citizen.Science - Sharing, Initiating, and Learning Citizen Science in Europe.
- LandSense - Urban Landscape Dynamics.
- Panelfit - Participatory Approaches to a New Ethical and Legal Framework for ICT.
- WeObserve - An Ecosystem of Citizen Observatories for Environmental Monitoring.
- iTechExplorers - Collation & Sharing of Data Related to Affects of Technology on Circadian Rhythms.

The ECSA is also a member of the Citizen Science Global Partnership.

=== ECSA ten principles ===
To complement the definition of citizen science, ECSA also developed Ten Principles of Citizen Science, which have been translated into numerous European languages and have been published as a chapter in the open access book Citizen Science - Innovation in Open Science, Society and Policy.

== See also ==
- List of citizen science projects
- Citizen Science Association - the Association for Advancing Participatory Sciences in the USA
- Australian Citizen Science Association
