= Andrzej Udalski =

Polish astronomer and astrophysicist

- Born: January 22, 1957; Łódź, Poland
- Education: University of Warsaw
- Known for: OGLE project
- Awards: Prize of the Foundation for Polish Science (2002); Dan David Prize (2017); Tycho Brahe Prize (2018); Karl Schwarzschild Medal (2018); Strait of Magellan Prize (2020); Copernicus Award (2024)
- Scientific career
- Fields: Astronomy, Astrophysics
- Workplaces: University of Warsaw

Andrzej Jarosław Udalski (born 22 January 1957 in Łódź, Poland) is a Polish astronomer and astrophysicist, and director of the Astronomical Observatory of the University of Warsaw. He is also head of the Department of Observational Astrophysics at Astronomical Observatory, the head and project manager of the Optical Gravitational Lensing Experiment, and editor of the quarterly journal Acta Astronomica.

== Education ==
He graduated from the Faculty of Physics, University of Warsaw in 1980. In that same year, he was employed at the Astronomical Observatory of the University of Warsaw. He received his Ph.D. in 1988 and then completed a two-year Postdoctoral Research Associate at York University in Toronto, Ontario, Canada.

== Contribution to astronomy ==
He has authored or co-authored nearly 400 scientific papers. In 1996, he was honored by the Prime Minister for outstanding scientific achievements. In 2002, he won the Prize of the Foundation for Polish Science (the so-called "Polish Nobel"). In 2009, he received a 2.5 million Euro grant from the program Ideas of the European Research Council that aims to support innovative research projects. In 2012, he became the recipient of the Commander's Cross of the Order of Polonia Restituta. He was also awarded the prestigious Dan David Prize (2017) for pioneering time-domain astronomy, the Karl Schwarzschild Medal (2018) as well as the Tycho Brahe Prize (2018) for his contributions to astronomy.

== OGLE ==
In April 1992, he launched the OGLE project, which aims at finding extrasolar planets using gravitational microlensing technique. Since then Udalski and his team made many important discoveries. Thanks to this project focusing on monitoring over a billion stars, he has discovered and characterized as many as a million variable stars of all types, expanding the knowledge by orders of magnitude. He was a pioneer of the use of gravitational microlensing which enabled him to exclude the presence of dark matter in the form of regular low-luminosity astrophysical bodies in the Milky Way halo. He was also one of the first ones to use the transit technique of extra-solar planet detection – the first transiting planets came mostly from the OGLE survey. Among other significant discoveries of the OGLE project are the detection of the first merger of a binary star, first Cepheid pulsating stars in the eclipsing binary systems, unique Nova systems, large Solar System dwarf planet candidates, many interesting quasars and galaxies. OGLE made many important contributions to the studies of the structure of the Milky Way and neighboring galaxies and calibration of the cosmic distance scale. In 1995-1996, he took part in the construction of the Warsaw Telescope at Las Campanas Observatory in Chile. In 2001, he built a wide-angle mosaic CCD camera with more than 65 million light-sensitive elements. Along with the OGLE team, he is also a co-discoverer of 14 extra-solar planets discovered by the technique of gravitational microlensing.

In 2020, astronomers from the University of Warsaw’s OGLE team at the Astronomical Observatory discovered the smallest rogue planet in the Milky Way galaxy thus confirming that low-mass rogue planets are common in the Milky Way, that there may be billions of them, and that they can be detected and characterized by observations from the Earth's surface.

== See also ==
- Polish Astronomical Society
- Polish Space Agency
- List of Poles
