= Darlene Cavalier =

- Education: University of Pennsylvania
- Occupations: Citizen science advocate, writer, editor

External videos
- "Darlene Cavalier is The Science Cheerleader"

Darlene Cavalier is an American professor of practice at Arizona State University's School for the Future of Innovation in Society. She is the founder of SciStarter (a science portal and research platform), founder of Science Cheerleaders (a non profit organization consisting of current and former NFL, NBA and college cheerleaders pursuing STEM careers), cofounder of ECAST: Expert and Citizen Assessment of Science and Technology, and she led the ideation and a team of collaborators to develop ScienceNearMe.org to connect, promote and research all types of opportunities for the public to engage in science. Her work is detailed by the Citizen Science Show and by MIT /UPenn.

== Biography ==
Cavalier (born Darlene Ebarb and a member of the Choctaw-Apache Tribe), is the sister of the late Mar Dixon, who created the popular #MuseumSelfie campaign to bring arts and culture to people from all walks of life. Cavalier earned a bachelor's degree from Temple University and a master's degree from the University of Pennsylvania where she studied the role of the non formal scientists in science.

She has served as a principal investigator on several awards from the federal agencies including the National Science Foundation, the National Institutes of Health, the Institute for Museum and Library Services, and several private foundation grants. She is a founding board member of the Citizen Science Association, an Explorer and Fellow at National Geographic, She is the co-editor of The Rightful Place of Science: Citizen Science, author of The Science of Cheerleading, and co-author of The Field Guide to Citizen Science. The book was translated into the Kyrgyz language in 2021.

In 2024, Cavalier was honored with the Pop Warner Inspiration to Youth Award for her efforts in promoting STEM education for young women. This award recognizes leaders in sports who exemplify humanitarian principles through their voices and actions. In 2024, Cavalier was bestowed with the Wagner Institute of Science's annual Sip of Science Award for "sparking broad public engagement in science." In 2022, Cavalier was awarded the Arizona State University Medal for Social Embeddedness for her team's development of Libraries as Community Hubs for Citizen Science. In 2016, Cavalier co-organized the Citizen Science Maker Summit, hosted by ASU. In 2017, Cavalier was appointed to the National Academy of Sciences' Committee on Designing Citizen Science to Support Science Learning to identify and describe existing citizen science projects that support science learning in both formal and informal settings. The committee will develop a set of evidence-based principles to guide the design of citizen science.

She is the founder of Science Cheerleaders, a non-profit organization of more than 300 current and former NFL and NBA cheerleaders pursuing careers in science, technology, engineering and math. They challenge stereotypes, inspire young women to consider STEM careers, and help people from all walks of life get involved in science. The organization plays on her former position as a cheerleader for the Philadelphia 76ers basketball team. In 2012, Cavalier was the recipient of the Pop Warner Cheer Award. In 2013, the Science Cheerleaders partnered with the Pop Warner organizations to lead the "world's largest cheerleading cheer," an event that was recognized by Guinness World Records. The Science Cheerleaders have been featured on national and international media outlets] and serve as principal investigators in research projects including Project MERCCURI, a study of microbes on the International Space Station.

In October 2020, SciStarter was featured on The Weather Channel and on Disney's Weird But True. In December 2022, her work received the President of Arizona State University's Medal for Social Embeddedness.

She was the Executive Director of Disney's Discover Magazine Awards for Technological Innovation and the senior advisor and contributor to Discover Magazine. She served on the steering committee of Science Debate 2008. Her writing has also appeared in science publications such as the New York Academy of Sciences Magazine and Science Progress. The Science Cheerleaders were featured on the Today Show, CNN, Fox National Headline News, the Washington Post, and other media outlets.
