= Acta Astronomica =

- Discipline: Astronomy, astrophysics
- Language: English
- Edited by: M. Jaroszyński, Andrzej Udalski

Publication details
- History: 1925–present
- Publisher: Copernicus Foundation for Polish Astronomy (Poland)
- Frequency: Quarterly
- Impact factor: 1.974 (2021)

Standard abbreviations
- ISO 4: Acta Astron.

Indexing
- CODEN: AASWAM
- ISSN: 0001-5237
- LCCN: 61046388
- OCLC no.: 819011450

Links
- Journal homepage

Acta Astronomica is a quarterly peer-reviewed scientific journal covering astronomy and astrophysics. It was established in 1925 by the Polish astronomer Tadeusz Banachiewicz. Initially, the journal published articles in Latin, later English, French, and German were added as allowed journal languages. Nowadays, all papers are published in English.

The journal is published by the Copernicus Foundation for Polish Astronomy and the editors-in-chief are M. Jaroszyński and Andrzej Udalski (University of Warsaw).

== Abstracting and indexing ==
This journal is abstracted and indexed in Current Contents/Physical, Chemical & Earth Sciences, the Science Citation Index Expanded, and Scopus.

According to the Journal Citation Reports, the journal has a 2021 impact factor of 1.974.
