= Farm Cove Observatory =

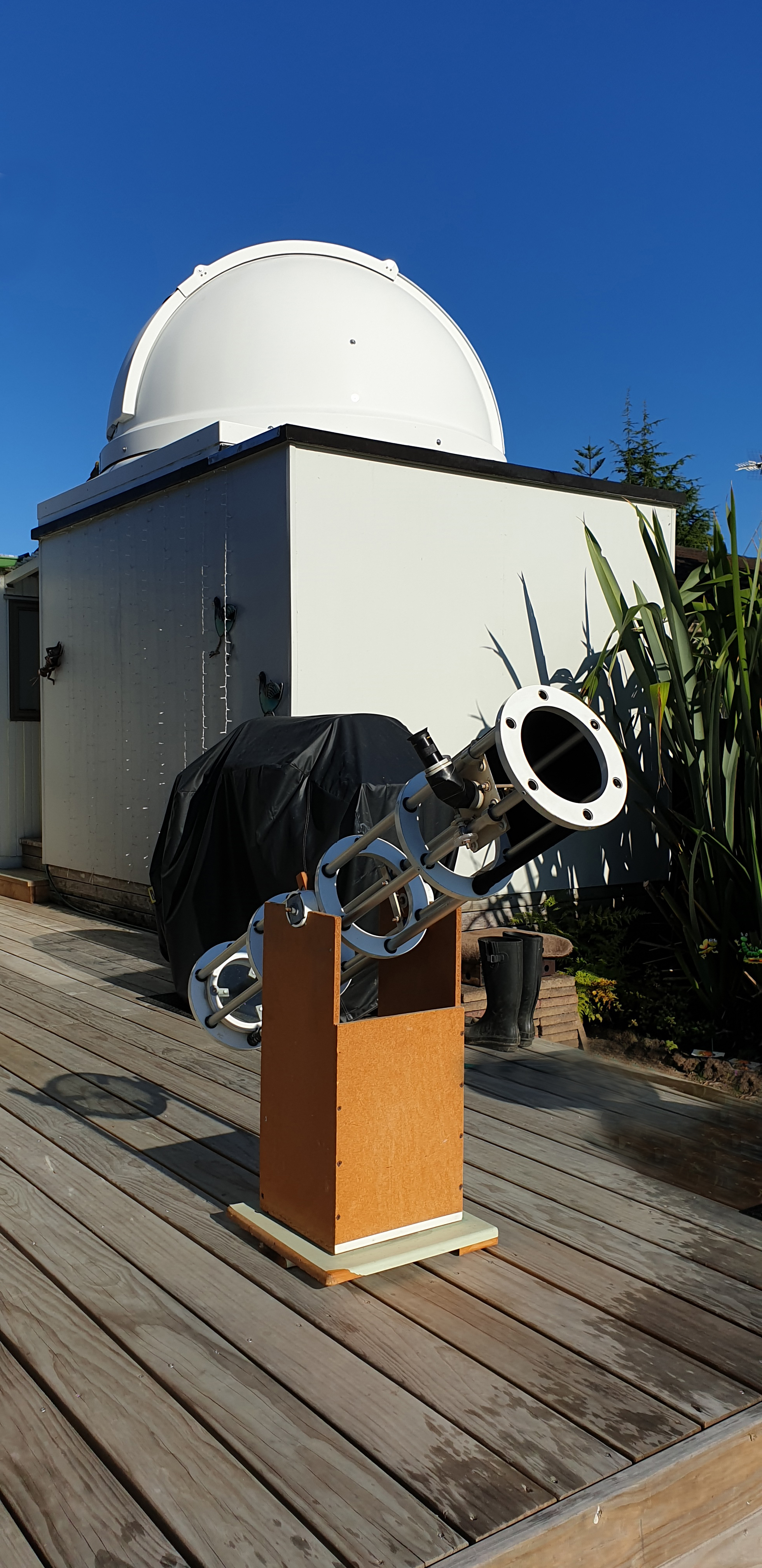
- Observatory code: E85
- Location: Pakuranga, Auckland, New Zealand
- Coordinates: 36.89368°S 174.89375°E
- Website: http://www.farmcoveobs.co.nz/
- Related media on Commons

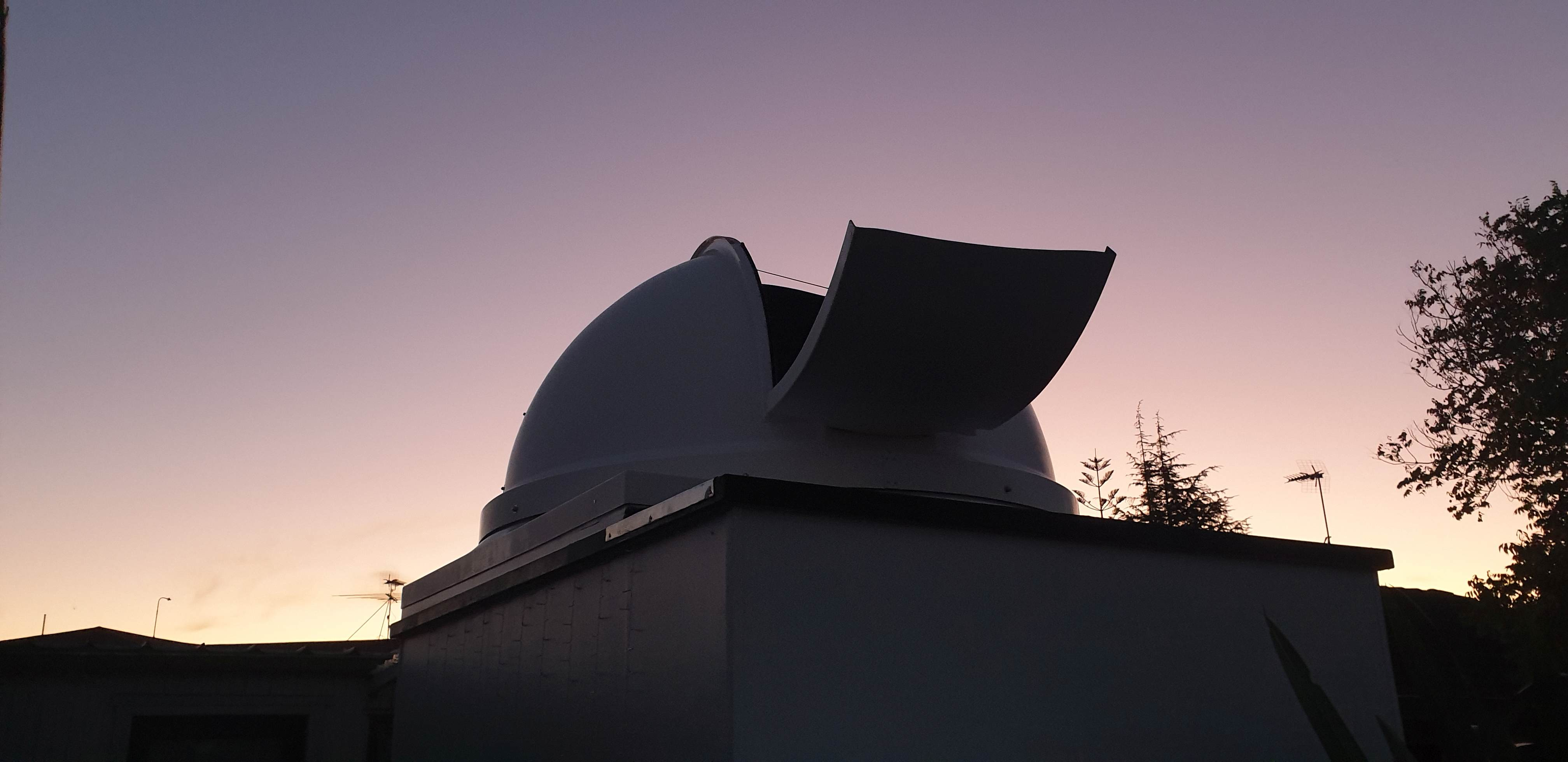
Farm Cove Observatory 2020

Farm Cove Observatory (FCO) was an amateur astronomical observatory in Pakuranga, Auckland, New Zealand, where Jennie McCormick discovered the main-belt asteroid 386622 New Zealand in September 2009.

Built in 2000, the observatory had a Meade LX200R 14" Schmidt-Cassegrain F/10 telescope, purchased and on loan from Ohio State University Astronomy Dept. The observatory used an SBIG ST8XME CCD camera with clear filter for data acquisition, this camera was supplied by the Centre for Backyard Astrophysics. FCO was only used for astronomical research.

Farm Cove Observatory took part in cataclysmic variable star (CV) research for the Center for Backyard Astrophysics and was also known as CBA Pakuranga. Up to January 2006, FCO had contributed to over 1400 hours of data to the CBA, and the data from this observatory has been used in a number of scientific papers .

In April 2004 Farm Cove Observatory joined the MicroFUN collaboration headed by Professor Andrew Gould at Ohio State University. The mission of MicroFUN is to obtain intense photometric monitoring of high magnification gravitational microlensing events in the hope of detecting planets orbiting the lensing star. Most of these events are found in the dense star fields of the bulge of the Milky Way galaxy.

The first success came in April 2005 when an exoplanet was detected in the event OGLE-2005-BLG-071 . The discovery was attributed to 31 professional astronomers and two amateurs. FCO contributed 12 hours of observations to this event. This new planet is about three times the mass of Jupiter and lies some 15,000 light-years toward the Galactic Bulge. This was only the second exoplanet detected by this technique and the first exoplanet discovery involving amateur observations.

FCO had been contributing unfiltered magnitude measures to the British Astronomical Association campaign on Blazar OJ+287.

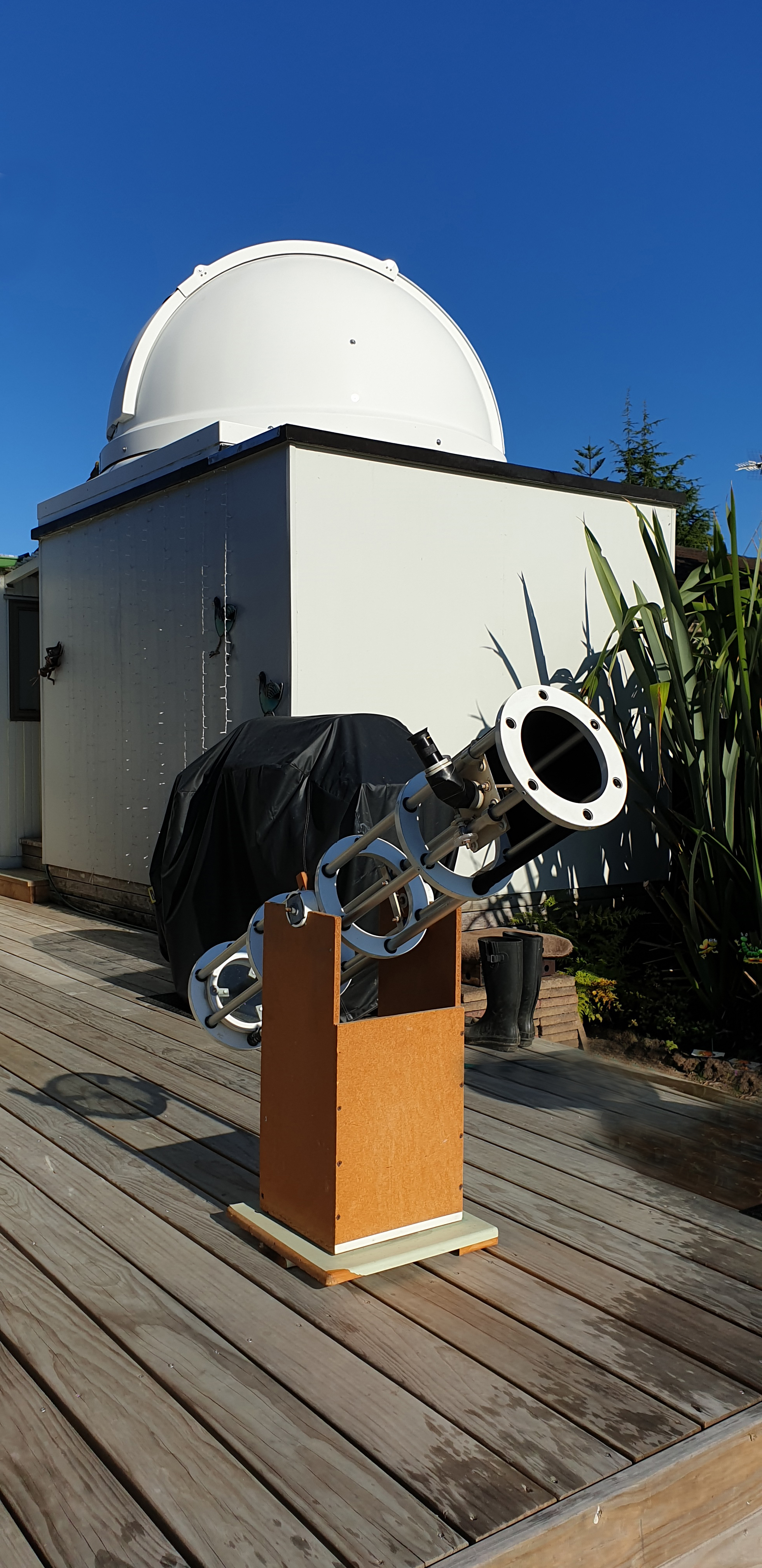
Farm Cove Observatory and 6" Brewster Angle Solar telescope
