= Philadelphia Science Festival =

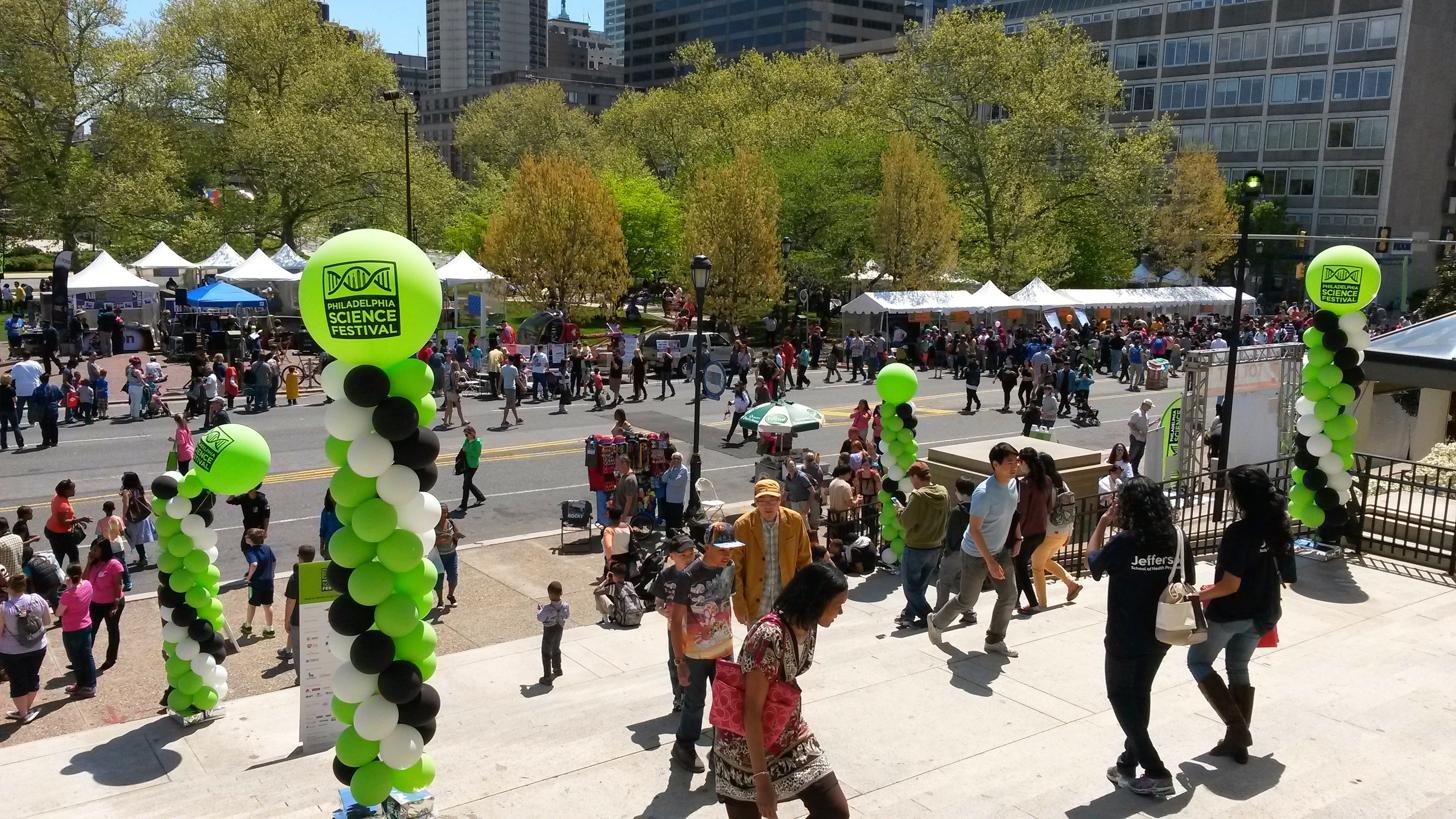
- Philadelphia Science Festival Carnival at the Franklin Institute in Philadelphia
- Status: Inactive
- Genre: Science Festival
- Frequency: Annually
- Locations: Philadelphia, Pennsylvania, U.S.
- Country: United States
- Inaugurated: April 15–28, 2011
- Most recent: April 16 - May 4, 2019
- Previous event: 2018
- Sponsor: FMC Corporation, presenting sponsor
- Website: www.fi.edu/psf

The Philadelphia Science Festival is an annual free science festival held in Philadelphia. The festival is organized and managed by the Franklin Institute.

The inaugural event was held from April 15, 2011, through April 28, 2011. Subsequently, the festival has been held every year in the second half of April. The festival stretches over a number of days and features events held throughout the city. It culminates with a Festival on Saturday that is typically held on the Benjamin Franklin Parkway.

== Mission ==
The stated mission of the festival is to bring together Philadelphia's schools, universities, cultural institutions and research centers to put science in the spotlight. Scientists and engineers present interactive programs for Philadelphians of all ages.

== Festivals by year ==
=== 2011 Festival ===
Held: April 15–28, 2011

- The inaugural festival began with a Carnival in Logan Circle on the Benjamin Franklin Parkway. This all-day event featured more than 80 exhibitors offering experiments, interactive activities, games and live entertainment. The Philadelphia Book Festival's Street Fair was held in conjunction with the carnival.
- Between April 18 and 27, scientists, engineers and other experts offered more than 50 programs in local libraries and community centers.
- On the 21st, an Astronomy night was held in the observatories at Drexel University, The University of Pennsylvania and the Franklin Institute. Stargazing sites were also set up at community centers, charter schools and even a burial ground. Derek Pitts, Chief Astronomer of the Franklin Institute made the rounds of the various star gazing sites. NASA Astronaut Guion Bluford made a special appearance at the University of the Sciences.
- Between April 15 and 28, a series of Science Conversations were held on a wide ranging array of topics at a number of venues across the city.
- During the second week of the Festival, restaurants, bars and cafes served as locales for discourse on a wide range of scientific topics.
- Throughout the month of April, the city explored the interaction between art and science, focusing on ways in which art can be used to interpret science and ways in which technology can impact the arts.
- Between the 19th and 25 April, events were presented to engage the entire family, such as Earth Day at the Franklin Institute and Science at the Ballpark.
- Throughout the Science Festival, a number of activities were planned specifically with students in mind.
- Recipients of the 2011 Franklin Medal presented a number of symposia and lectures prior to the ceremony. At the same time, the American Philosophical Society held its annual meeting which was webcast to the public.

=== 2012 Festival ===
Held: April 20–29, 2012

- The Science Carnival was held on April 21 on the Logan Circle.
- The rest of the festival consisted of programs categorized as:
  - Signature Programs, e.g., "I Smell You, You Smell Me", "Dava Sobel: A More Perfect Heaven"
  - Science Film Fest, e.g., "Man on a Mission", "The Corridor"
  - Neighborhood Science, e.g., "Nano Discovery Day", "Clark Park Science Discovery Day"
  - Cafe Events, e.g., "Collider: The Search for the World's Smallest Particles", "Wine Chemistry: Best and Worst Pairings"
  - Astronomy Night, held at multiple locations on April 27
  - Laureate and Luminary Symposia, held during Franklin Institute Awards Week

=== 2013 Festival ===
Held: April 18–28, 2013

- April 18 - The kick-off party was held at NextFab Studios on April 18 in a program called "Science after dark".
- April 20 - The Science Carnival was held on the Benjamin Franklin Parkway
- Examples of other events throughout the festival:
  - Educator workshops on topics such as "Integrating experiential education in the STEM classroom" and "Revealing our genetic code"
  - Neighborhood science after school, held in multiple schools in the region
  - Health and wellness topics such as "Gaming as therapy" and "Public Health in Philadelphia".
  - Food and drink topics such as "5 Senses Pub Crawl", "The science of beer and cheese" and "Sweet and Savory: Hives and Honey".
  - Scientific foundations of everyday topics such as "The history, culture and how-to of taxidermy", "How medicine works: a microscopic army" and "Science of Jazz: Waves, scales and beats".

=== 2014 Festival ===
Held: April 25 - May 3, 2014

- April 18 - The kick-off party was held at the Franklin Institute on April 25 in a program called "Science After Hours".
- May 3 - The Science Carnival was held on the Benjamin Franklin Parkway
- Examples of other events throughout the festival:
  - April 25 - Astronomy Night
  - April 26 - Discovery Day at Clark Park, Hunting Park, The Schuylkill Center and Fox Chase Farm
  - April 27 - Explorer Sunday - Birding Smackdown, Making Medicine, Field work with an Urban Naturalist, Plasma Lab, Ecosystem Exploration, etc.
  - April 28 - Science on Tap Quizzo, Science Happy Hour (Human Health), Feathered Friends
  - April 29 - Science Night at the Ballpark, West Philly Science Showcase, Creatures that make your skin crawl, Perspectives on Public Health
  - April 30 - I love my science job; To veg or not to veg; Love, lust and loathing; Playing with numbers
  - May 1 - DIY Science (Fermentation), Science storytelling, Cure you or kill you
  - May 2 - Chemical Heritage Foundation First Friday, The Magical Mushroom, Beer Chemistry

=== 2015 Festival ===
Held: April 24 - May 2, 2015

- April 24 - The kick-off party was held at the Franklin Institute on April 24 in a program called "8-Bit Night".
- May 2 - The Science Carnival was held on the Benjamin Franklin Parkway
- Examples of other events throughout the festival:
  - April 24 - Astronomy Night
  - April 25 - Discovery Day at Chestnut Hill, Clark Park, Hunting Park, Smith Memorial Playground, Schuylkill Center; Science Night at the Ballpark
  - April 26 - Explorer Sunday - DNA (Cell)fie Station; Science at Sea; Is there a doctor in the house?; Notes, bits and bytes; Fishtown Science Crawl
  - April 27 - Science on Tap Quizzo; Big ideas for busy people; DIY Brewing (Cider and Mead)
  - April 28 - Science of Networking; An Alchemist's toast to Health, Wealth and Longevity; Cookie Lab
  - April 29 - Let's get happy; Nerd Nite (Science Myths Busted!)
  - April 30 - Dinner from the weeds; Gross Anatomy; Inspired by Nature
  - May 1 - Beer Lab; You're the expert
  - Neighborhood Science and Educator Workshops were held throughout the week.

=== 2016 Festival ===
Held: April 22–30, 2016

- April 30 - The Science Carnival was held on the Great Plaza at Penn's Landing
- Preview Events - Science Night at the Ballpark on April 16; Geek's Guide to Philly on April 18
- Examples of other events throughout the festival:
  - April 22 - Astronomy Night
  - April 23 - Discovery Day - Naturepalooza! Family Earth Day Festival; Family Science Fun Day in the Park
  - April 24 - Explorer Sunday - Astrogenesis; Medicine 1776; Symmetry, Sequence and Starfish; Doctor for a day; Bugs, Bees and Botany; Fishtown Science Crawl
  - April 25 - Gaffes on Tap; Cocktail Lab
  - April 26 - 2066, A Science Odyssey - What will our world look like?; Kitchen Lab: Chocolate; Science at Play for the Young at Heart
  - April 27 - Science Expo: 1866; Science of Fear; Nerd Nite: What it means to be human
  - April 28 - LGBTQ in STEM; Kitchen Lab: Tapping the Roots; Gross Anatomy: The Human Microbiome; You're the Expert; Grow a Pint!
  - April 29 - Science after Hours: PSF Closing Party - The Nerd Olympics
  - Neighborhood Science events were held throughout the week.

=== 2017 Festival ===
Held: April 21–29, 2017

- April 29 - The Science Carnival was held at Penn's Landing
- Preview Events - Science Night at the Ballpark on April 9; Geek's Guide to Philly on April 11
- Examples of other events throughout the festival:
  - April 21 - Science after Hours: Prom; Dance Engineered
  - April 22 - Science in the Park was held in the Schuylkill Center, Hunting Park and Clark Park; Tinker Lab; Dance Engineered
  - April 23 - Be a Scientist - Be a Paleontologist, Be an Ecologist, Be a Doctor, Be an Engineer, Be a Marine Biologist, Be an Environmental Scientist; Fishtown Science Crawl; Murder at the Mutter: Hooked
  - April 24 - Cocktail Lab: Rum; Science on Tap Un-tapped: Scientific Malarkey
  - April 25 - Cookie Lab; Fake Out: The Science of Deception; Sensory Overload
  - April 26 - Science Storytime; Geek Out Game Show
  - April 27 - Science in the National Park; Life on Mars; Gross Anatomy: Sex
  - April 28 - Citywide Star Party
  - Science After School events were held throughout the week

=== 2018 Festival ===
Held: April 20–28, 2018

- April 28 - The Science Carnival was held on Benjamin Franklin Parkway
- Preview Events - STEM Career Showcase on March 16; Science at the Ballpark on April 8
- Examples of other events throughout the festival:
  - April 20 - Citywide Star Party; Philadelphia Science Spotlight; Top Secret Rosies
  - April 21 - Nature-palooza! Earth Day Celebration; Family Food Science; Science in the Park; Patent Pending
  - April 22 - Be a Scientist!; Beer Brunch: Fizzics Class; Science Slam; Murder at the Mutter: Illusion; Fishtown Science Crawl
  - April 23 - Science on Tap Untapped: Schooled by Science; The Future of Food
  - April 24 - Community Night; From the Delaware River's Heart...
  - April 25 - For the Love of Science: An evening of Story-telling; Science of Distilling
  - April 26 - Science in the National Park; Brain Food: Science Night at the Market
  - April 27 - Science + Music: West Philadelphia STEM-a-Thon; Parent's Night Out: Taste of Hunting Park
  - Science After School events were held throughout the week.

=== 2019 Festival ===
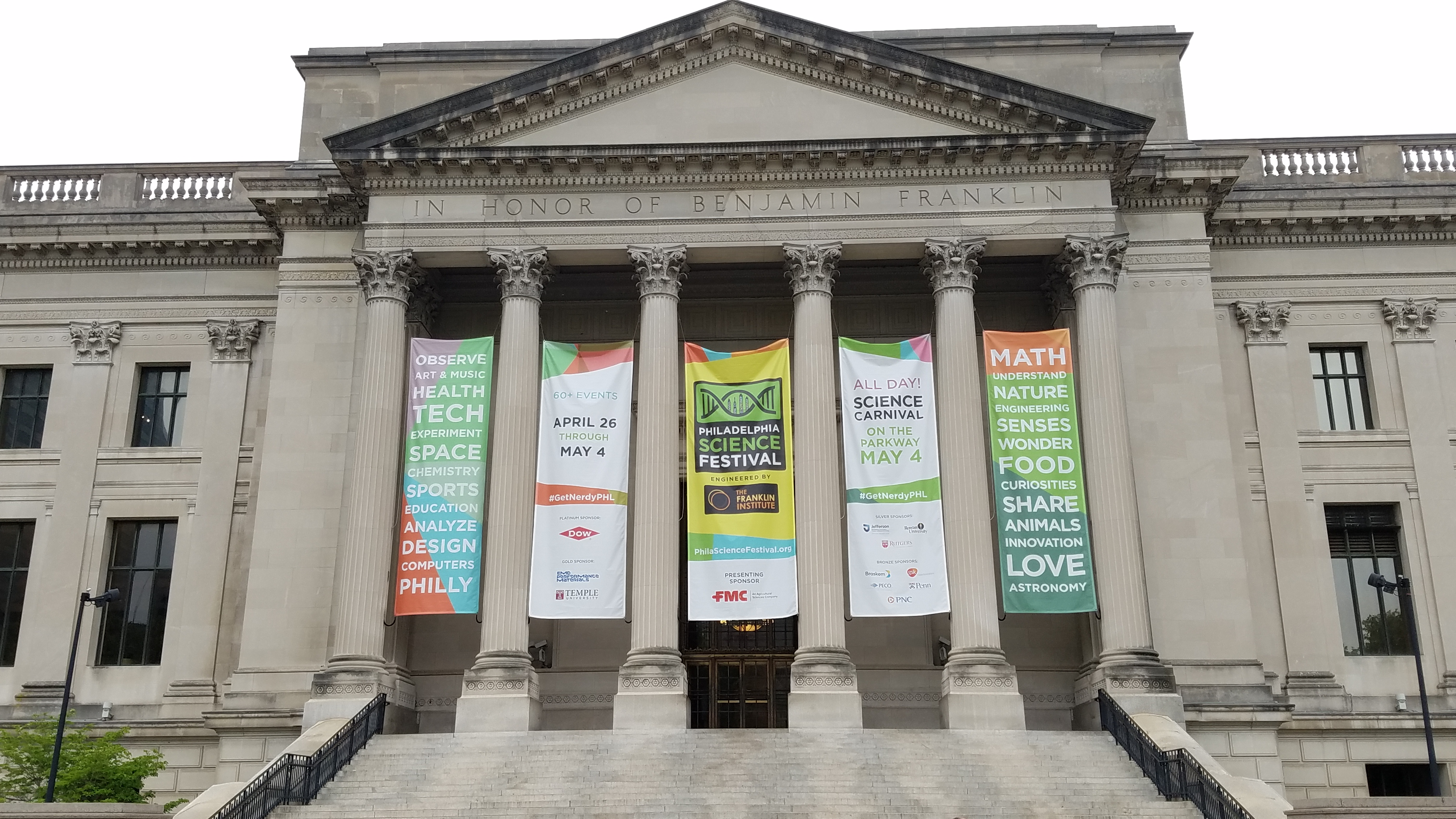
2019 Philadelphia Science Festival, highlighted on the facade of The Franklin Institute

Held: April 26 - May 4, 2019
FMC Corporation became the Festival's new Presenting Sponsor

- April 26 - A Citywide Star Party, organized at 25 separate locations, had to be cancelled because of inclement weather.
- April 27 - A "Science in the Park" event was held at Clark Park and a "Science Saturday" event was held at the Camden campus of Rutgers University.
- April 28
  - "Be a Scientist" events were held in Philly's research institutions, universities, hospitals and museums such as Abington Hospital-Jefferson Health, Independence Seaport Museum, Temple University and Wagner Free Institute of Science.
  - "Science Sunday" was held at Rowan University.
  - "Fishtown Science Crawl" was held at multiple Fishtown venues such as La Colombe Coffee Roasters.
- April 29
  - "Science after School" events were held at three local libraries.
  - "Science on Tap Untapped" was a forum where six speakers from local institutions talked about how they got interested in their areas of research.
- April 30 - "Science after School" events were held at four additional libraries.
- May 1 - The final "Science after School" events were held at three regional libraries.
- May 2 - Independence National Historical Park hosted an event entitled "Science in the National Park".
- May 3 - The Festival helped to kick off the week-long celebration of technology and innovation at Philly Tech Week.
- May 4 - The Science Carnival was held on the Benjamin Franklin Parkway, featuring over 150 exhibitors.

=== 2020 Festival ===
On the 18th of March, the festival was canceled. The following notice was placed on the festival's Facebook page: "In response to the COVID-19 outbreak and following the guidelines set forth by the CDC, the Philadelphia Science Festival (April 16–25, 2020) has been canceled."

=== 2021 Festival ===
No festival was held in 2021.

== See also ==
- List of festivals in the United States
