= Arago =

Arago may refer to:

== People ==
- The French Arago family:
  - François Bonaventure Arago (1754–1814), politician, father of the six Arago brothers
  - Marie Arago (1755–1845), mother of the six Arago brothers
    - Étienne Arago (1802–1892), journalist, theatre director, and politician, youngest of the six brothers
    - François Arago (1786–1853), mathematician, physicist, astronomer, and politician, oldest of the six brothers
    - Jacques Arago (1790–1855), writer, artist and explorer, third of the six brothers
    - Jean Arago (1788–1836), Treasurer of the Perpignan Mint, then a general in the Mexican army, second of the six brothers
    - Joseph Arago (1796–1860), soldier in the Mexican army, fifth of the six brothers
    - Victor Arago (1792–1867), soldier, fourth of the six brothers
  - Emmanuel Arago (1812–1896), politician, son of François Arago

Also:

- Aragó, a family name of the kings of the Aragonese Crown
- Jamal Arago (born 1993), Liberian professional footballer
- Josep Riera i Aragó (born 1954), Catalan artist

== Places ==
=== Earth ===
- Aragó, the Catalan name for the Aragon region of Spain
- Arago, Oregon, United States, an unincorporated community
- Arago Township, Minnesota, United States
- Cape Arago, Cape Arago State Park, Oregon, United States
- Arago Glacier, Graham Land, Antarctica
- Arago cave, Tautavel, France, a site where prehistoric remains of Tautavel Man were discovered
- Arago hotspot, a geological hotspot near the Arago seamount in the south Pacific Ocean

=== Outer space ===
- Arago (lunar crater)
- Arago (Martian crater), named after François Arago
- 1005 Arago, an asteroid
- one of the rings of Neptune, named in honor of François Arago

== Ships ==
- USC&GS Arago, two ships of the United States Coast Survey and United States Coast and Geodetic Survey
- USS Arago, an armed survey ship that served in the United States Navy from 1861 to 1863
- SS Arago (1855), a steam ship used for mail and passenger service and, during the American Civil War, as a troop transport
- French submarine Arago (1912–1921)

== Other uses ==
- Lycée Arago (Paris), France, a secondary school
- Arago telescope, a refractor at Paris Observatory, Paris, France
- Arago, a character in Ronin Warriors, see Talpa
- Arago, a manga series written by Takahiro Arai.

== See also ==
- Arago spot, optical phenomenon
- Aragoscope, a type of telescope design
- Arago's rotations, magnetic phenomenon
