= List of École Polytechnique faculty =

This list of École Polytechnique faculty includes current and former professors of École Polytechnique, a French scientific higher education institution established during the French Revolution in 1794 in Paris and moved to Palaiseau in 1976.

== Faculty ==
Name	Department	Notability	Reference
André-Marie Ampère (1775–1836)	Analysis (1807–1808); Mechanics (1809–1827)	Co-discoverer of electromagnetism	
François Arago (1786–1853) (X1803)	Geometry (1810–1815); Analysis (1816–1829)	Mathematician, physicist, astronomer and politician	
Joseph Bertrand (1822–1900)	Analysis, Mathematics (1844–1895)	Bertrand paradox (probability), Bertrand paradox (economics)	
Augustin Louis Cauchy (1789–1857) (X1805)	Analysis (1815–1829)	Early pioneer of analysis	
Alain Finkielkraut (born 1949)	Humanities and Social sciences		
Antoine François, comte de Fourcroy (1755–1809)	Chemistry	Co-discovered iridium, co-founded modern chemical nomenclature	
Joseph Fourier (1768–1830)	Analysis	Fourier series, Fourier transform, Fourier's law of conduction	
Jean Nicolas Pierre Hachette (1769–1834)	Descriptive Geometry	Mathematician	
Charles Hermite (1822–1901)	Mathematics (1869–)	Hermite polynomials, Hermite interpolation, Hermite normal form, Hermitian operators, and cubic Hermite splines are named in his honor	
Joseph-Louis Lagrange (1736–1813)		first professor of analysis at the École Polytechnique upon its opening in 1794	
Claude-Louis Mathieu (1783–1875) (X1803)	Analysis (1833–1838)	Mathematician and astronomer who worked on the distance of the stars	
Gaspard Monge (1746–1818)	Descriptive Geometry	French mathematician and inventor of descriptive geometry	
Claude-Louis Navier (1785–1836) (X1802)	Analysis (1831–1832)	Major contributor to modern structural analysis	
Paul Painlevé (1863–1933)	Mathematics	Painlevé transcendents	
Louis Poinsot (1777–1859) (X1794)	Analysis (1809–1811)	Inventor of geometrical mechanics	
Felix Savary (1797–1841) (X1815)	Analysis (1830–1841)	Astronomer who worked on double stars	
Laurent Schwartz (1915–2002)	Mathematics (1959–1980)	Pioneer of the theory of distributions	
Giovanni De Micheli	Institute of Electrical Engineering	Pioneer of the Network on a chip	
