= Marie Arago =

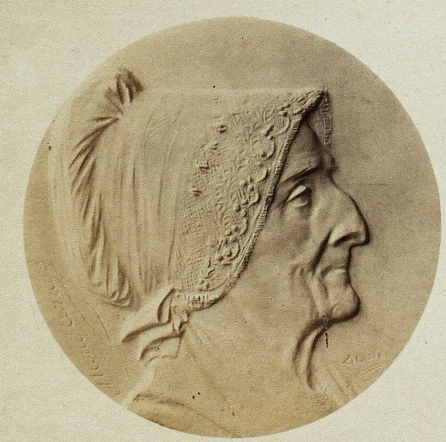
- Portrait of Marie Arago by David d'Angers
- Born: Marie-Anne Roig; Corneilla-la-Rivière, France
- Died: Estagel
- Occupation: Mother

Marie Arago, born Marie-Anne Roig (3 November 1755 – 5 September 1845) was a French woman, wife of François Bonaventure Arago and mother of the six Arago brothers, François, Jean, Jacques, Victor, Joseph and Étienne Arago.

She raised her eight children alone after the death of her husband in 1814, passed on her human values and encouraged them to pursue their studies.

An "Arago clan" was formed around her eldest son, François, at the Paris Observatory, including Claude-Louis Mathieu (who married his sister Marguerite), Alexander von Humboldt and Félix Savary.

== Biography ==
=== Origins and youth (1755–1778) ===
Marie-Anne-Agathe Roig was born on 3 November 1755 in Corneilla-la-Rivière, a village of about 700 inhabitants (Note: The census of 1793 gives 755 inhabitants.) in the province of Roussillon, a Catalan language region that had belonged to France since 1659. Her father, François Roig, was a pagès, a well-to-do peasant, from Corneilla-la-Riviere. He was a soldier with the rank of an officer. Her paternal grandfather, Camo Roig, was a doctor. Her paternal uncle was pastor of Ponteilla, another village in the same region of southern France, about a dozen kilometres southeast of Corneilla-la-Rivière.

Her mother, named Victoire Brial, was the daughter of a pagès of Camélas. This village is also located about twelve kilometres from Corneilla-la-Rivière, but south-southwest.

At a time when almost all women in the region were illiterate (90% of women of her generation were unable to sign their marriage certificates), she learned to read and write alone, while hiding, from books written in Latin.

=== Estagel (1778–1797) ===
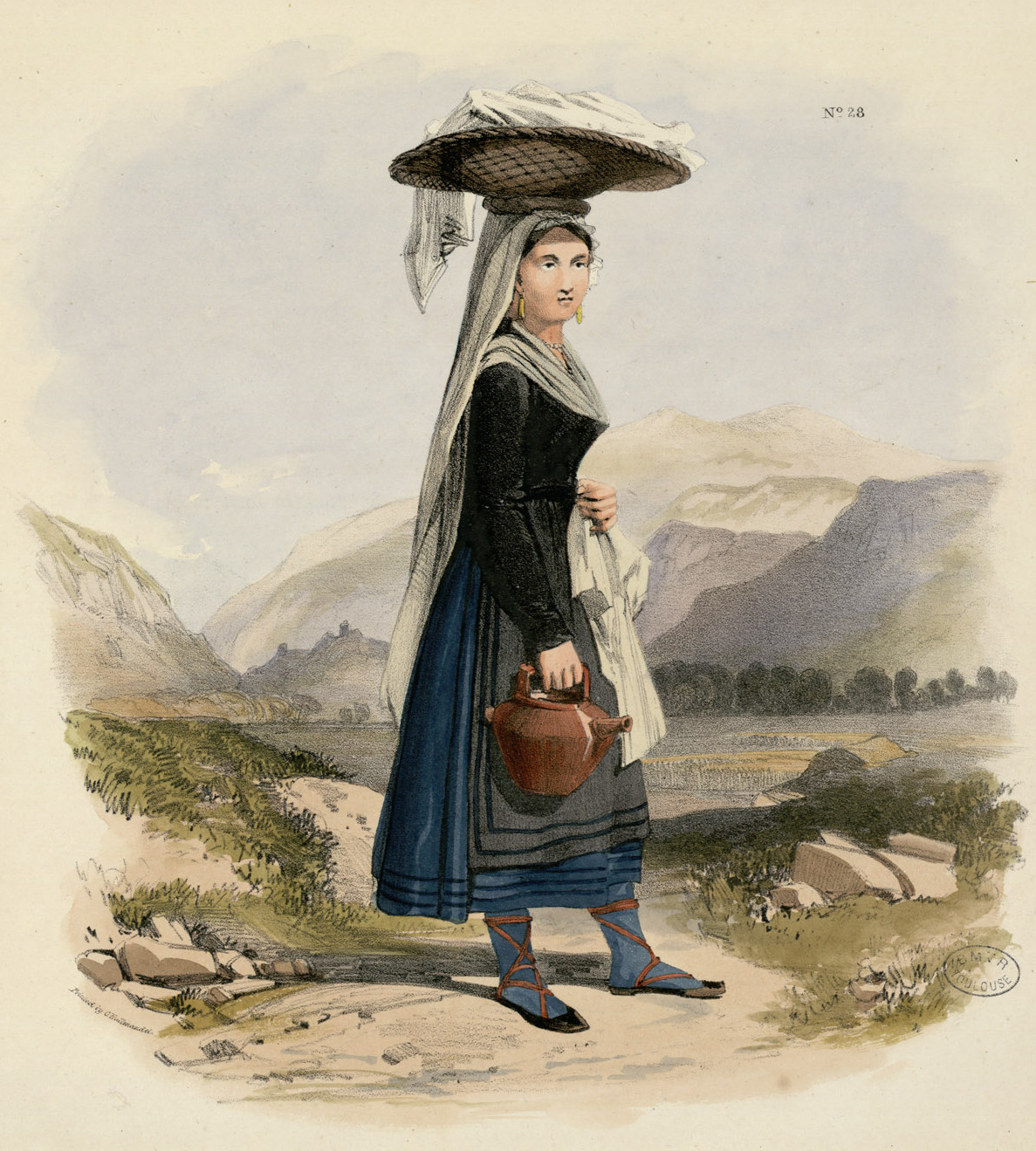
A peasant woman from Roussillon, c. 1830 (lithograph by James Duffield Harding)

On 12 August 1778, with a dowry of 2,200 livres, she married François Bonaventure Arago in Corneilla-la-Rivière. He was a pagès with a degree in law. Their marriage produced eleven children. They raised them in the local Catalan language. The couple moved to Estagel, a Roussillon town of 1,000 inhabitants, located a dozen kilometres north of Corneilla-la-Rivière.

François Bonaventure Arago was of the same social background as Marie Roig. A farmer and moderately well-off proprietor, he was orphaned at a very young age and was raised by an uncle, a priest who enrolled him in law school in Perpignan. His social background, however, did not allow him to take a more prestigious job as a notary or lawyer.

In 1779, Marie Arago gave birth to a daughter, Marie-Rose, who died in 1780. 1780 was also the year of the birth and death of Arago's second daughter, Marie-Thérèse. A third girl, named Marie-Victoire, was born and died in infancy in 1783. Meanwhile, in 1782, the couple gave birth to another daughter, Rose, who lived until 1832.

In 1781 her husband began a political career, gradually climbing the ladder in the municipal affairs of the village of Estagel until becoming, from June 1786 to June 1787, first consul of the village, which corresponds to the mandate of a mayor today. In 1789, he wrote a large part of the Cahiers de doléances (Book of grievances) of Estagel.

He became in 1790 the first mayor of the commune newly created by the revolution, then in the following years was given high departmental responsibilities. Mary gave birth to other children: François (1786), Jean (1788), Jacques (1790), Victor (1792), Joseph (1796) and Marguerite (1798). All were born in Estagel.

During the War of the Pyrenees, in 1793 François Bonaventure Aragon commanded the National Guard of Estagel. This was an army of volunteer citizens formed to defend the Revolution against the Spanish enemy. The family gave lodgings to many French soldiers and officers, to which François, the eldest son, then aged seven, would later attribute his taste for military matters.

=== Perpignan (1797–1816) ===
From 1797 until his death, François Bonaventure Aragon was Treasurer of the Perpignan Mint.

=== Return to Estagel (1816–1845) ===
After the death of her daughter Rose, Marie Arago became, at age 77, the guardian of Rose's four children.

== Children ==
According to Muriel Toulotte, biographer of Étienne Arago, "all her life, Marie Arago had a huge influence on her children and also on all those around her." The children of Marie and François Bonaventure Arago all behaved with righteousness and honesty, following the example of their father. From their mother, they gained at the same time the dynamism that animated them, kindness towards others and great gaiety. On the other hand, the boys were much less religious than their mother. Jacques was not a believer and Étienne went so far as asking to be buried without any religious ceremony.

She had six sons, all of whom distinguished themselves:

- Dominique François Jean (François Arago) (1786–1853), astronomer, physician and French politician
- Jean Martin (Jean Arago (1788–1836), Treasurer of the Perpignan Mint, then a general in the Mexican army
- Jacques Étienne Victor (Jacques Arago) (1790–1854), novelist, playwright and explorer
- Pierre Jean Victor (Victor Arago) (1792–1867), French soldier
- Joseph Honoré (Joseph Arago) (1796–1860), soldier in the Mexican army
- Étienne Vincent (Étienne Arago) (1802–1892), playwright and politician, mayor of Paris in 1870

She also gave birth to five daughters, only two of whom survived infancy: Rose (1782–1832) and Marguerite (1798–1859), who married Claude-Louis Mathieu in 1824.

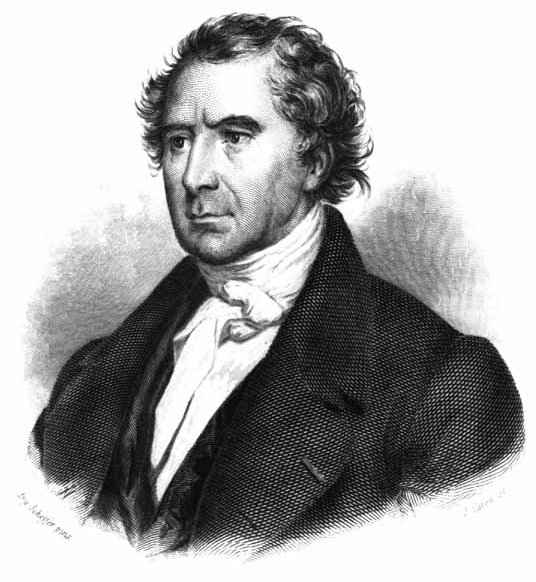
François Arago

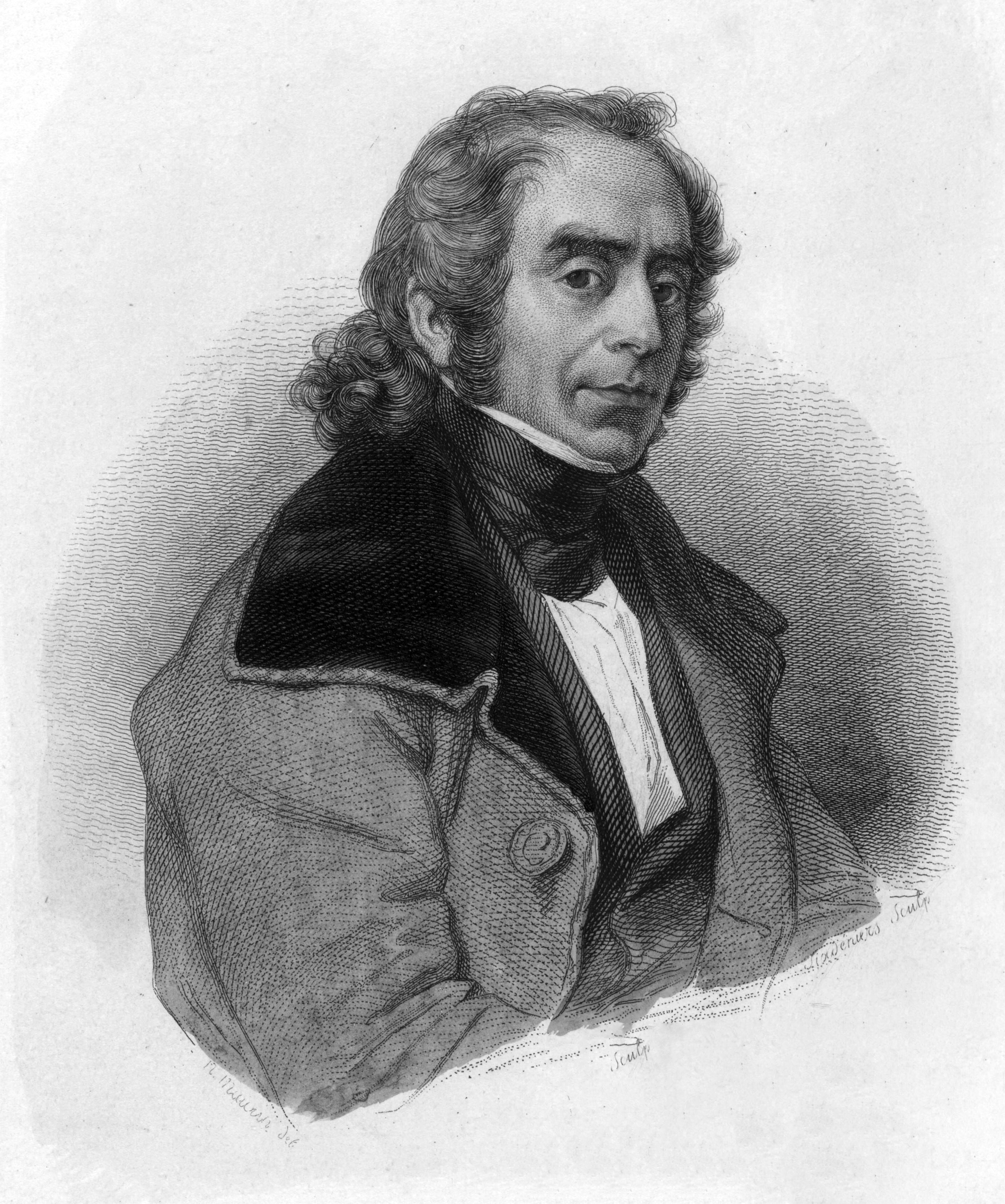
Jacques Arago

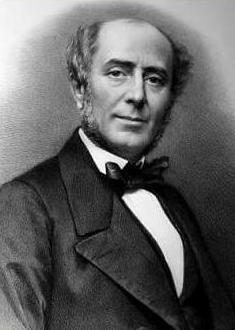
Étienne Arago

== Sources ==
- Arago, François (1854), Histoire de ma jeunesse (in French), Kiessling, Schnée et Company
- Des villages de Cassini aux communes d'aujourd'hui : Corneilla-la-Rivière, Ecole des Hautes Etudes en Sciences Sociales
- Des villages de Cassini aux communes d'aujourd'hui : Estagel, École des hautes études en sciences sociales
- Frénay, Étienne (2003), "Marie Arago", Les Arago, acteurs de leur temps (actes du colloque de Perpignan, 2003), Perpignan: Archives départementales des Pyrénées-orientales, p. 486, ISBN 978-2-86066-039-6
- Frénay, Étienne (2011), "Arago (François Bonaventure, Raymond)", Nouveau Dictionnaire de Biographies Roussillonnaises 1789-2011 (in French), vol. 1 Pouvoirs et société, t. 1 (A-L), Perpignan: Publications de l'olivier, p. 699, ISBN 9782908866414
- Frénay, Étienne (2011a), "Arago (Marie)", Nouveau Dictionnaire de Biographies Roussillonnaises 1789-2011 (in French), vol. 1 Pouvoirs et société, t. 1 (A-L), Perpignan: Publications de l'olivier, p. 699, ISBN 9782908866414
- Lequeux, James (2008), François Arago, un savant généreux : Physique et astronomie au XIX siecle, Sciences & histoire (in French), EDP Sciences, p. 523, ISBN 9782868839992
- Sarda, François (2002), Les Arago : François et les autres, Paris: Librairie Jules Tallandier, p. 442, ISBN 9782847340051
- Toulotte, Muriel (1993), "Une mère hors du commun", Étienne Arago : 1802-1882 Une vie, un siècle (in French), Perpignan: Publications de l'olivier, p. 367, ISBN 290886603X
