= François Bonaventure Arago =

French politician (1754–1814)

François Bonaventure Arago (30 January 1754 – 24 December 1814) was a French politician. He was also the father of the "Arago brothers".

== Early life and education ==
François Bonaventure Arago was born on 30 January 1754 in Estagel, Roussillon, into a family of wealthy landowners. He was orphaned at the age of one, and then raised by his uncle, a priest who enrolled him in law school in Perpignan. In 1774, he received a bachelor's degree in law from the University of Perpignan.

== Career ==
After receiving a university education, he became involved in the municipal administration of Estagel at an early age, becoming manager of the community's mills in 1781, first consul in 1786, and then municipal collector in 1787.

A supporter of new ideas, he was one of the notables who rallied to the French Revolution after 1789. He became mayor of Estagel in 1790, justice of the peace for the canton of Estagel, a member of the Departmental Council and then the Departmental Directory in 1791, commander of the National Guard during the Franco-Spanish War of 1793, president of the Departmental Directory in 1794, and from 1797 until his death, Treasurer of the Perpignan Mint.

== Personal life ==
On 12 August 1778, he married Marie Roig, with whom he had eleven children: five daughters (three of whom died in infancy) and six sons, all of whom distinguished themselves:

- Dominique François Jean (François Arago) (1786–1853), astronomer, physician and French politician
- Jean Martin (Jean Arago (1788–1836), Treasurer of the Perpignan Mint, then a general in the Mexican army
- Jacques Étienne Victor (Jacques Arago) (1790–1854), novelist, playwright and explorer
- Pierre Jean Victor (Victor Arago) (1792–1867), French soldier
- Joseph Honoré (Joseph Arago) (1796–1860), soldier in the Mexican army
- Étienne Vincent (Étienne Arago) (1802–1892), playwright and politician, mayor of Paris in 1870

Two daughters survived infancy: Rose (1782–1832) and Marguerite (1798–1859), who married Claude-Louis Mathieu in 1824.

He died on 24 December 1814 in Perpignan.

== Bibliography ==
- Frénay, Étienne (2009). Les Arago, acteurs de leur temps (actes du colloque de Perpignan, 2003) [The Arago, actors of their time (proceedings of the Perpignan conference, 2003)] (in French). Perpignan: Archives départementales des Pyrénées-orientales. ISBN 978-2-86066-039-6.
- Sarda, François (2011). Nouveau Dictionnaire de biographies roussillonnaises 1789-2011, vol. 1 Pouvoirs et société, t. 1 (A-L) [New Dictionary of Roussillon Biographies 1789-2011, vol. 1 Powers and Society, t. 1 (A-L)] (in French). Perpignan: Publications de l'olivier. ISBN 9782908866414.
- Sarda, François (2002). Les Arago : François et les autres [The Arago: François and the others] (in French). Paris: Tallandier. ISBN 9782847340051.
- Toulotte, Muriel (1993). "L'exemple du père". Étienne Arago: 1802-1882 Une vie, un siècle [Étienne Arago: 1802-1882 A life, a century] (in French). Perpignan: Publications de l'olivier. pp. 17–20. ISBN 290886603X.
- The personal papers of the Arago family are kept in the French National Archives under the code 348AP. They can be consulted in the form of microfilms.
