= Jean-Augustin Barral =

French agronomist and balloonist

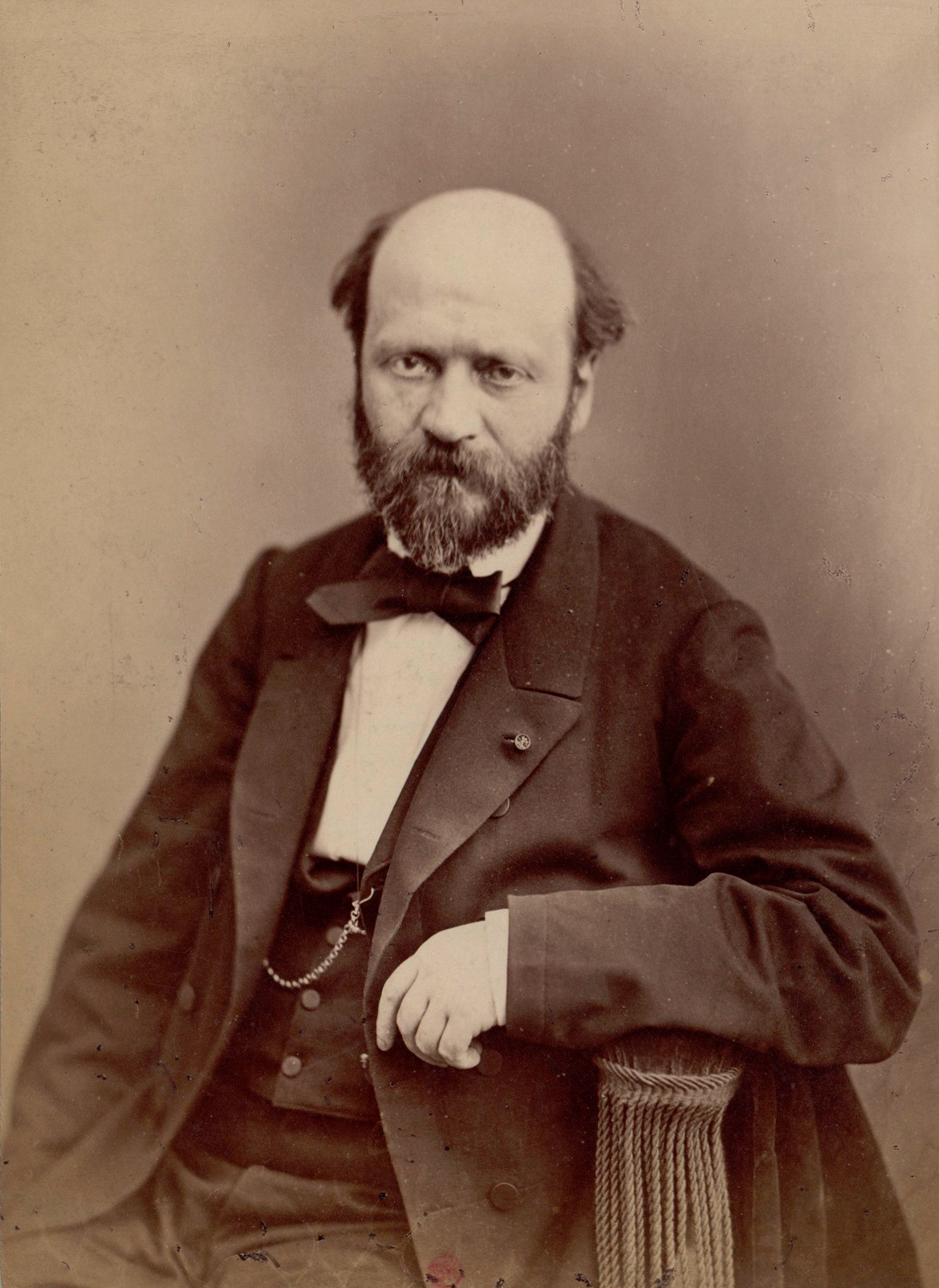
Jean-Augustin Barral

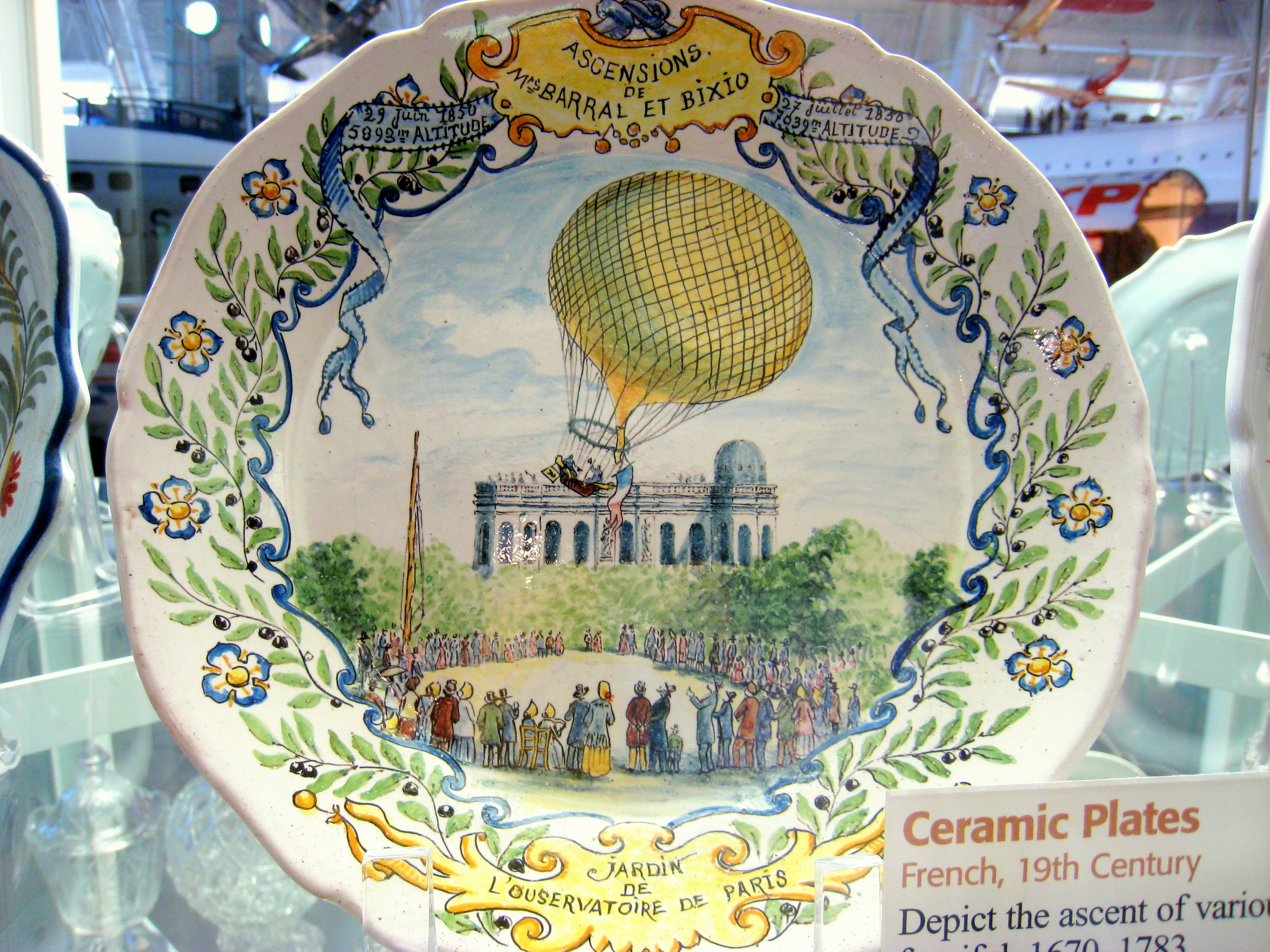
Barral and Bixio balloon ascent, 1850

Jean-Augustin Barral (31 January 1819 – 10 September 1884) was a French agronomist and balloonist.

Barral was born in Metz (Moselle). He studied at a polytechnic school and became a physicist as well as a professor of chemistry and agronomy. He wrote many works of popular science, especially concerning agriculture and irrigation, and became director of publication of scientific works. He was named perpetual secretary of the National Agricultural Society of France. He died in Fontenay-sous-Bois in 1884.

His name was included as one of the 72 names on the Eiffel Tower. He was a friend of Jacques Alexandre Bixio.

== Biography ==
A former student of the École polytechnique (X1838), he became a professor of chemistry. He authored numerous popular science books, particularly on agriculture and irrigation, and became the editor of scientific publications.

He was editor of La Démocratie pacifique, Victor Considerant's newspaper, co-founder in 1837 with Jacques Alexandre Bixio of the Journal d'agriculture pratique, which he edited from 1850 onwards, and author of numerous scientific articles in the Revue des deux Mondes, the Dictionnaire des arts et manufactures, and the Annales de chimie et de physique. He continued his journalistic career by founding La Presse scientifique des deux mondes in 1865, the official publication of the Cercle de la Presse scientifique. In 1866, following his dismissal from the management of the Journal d'agriculture pratique, he founded the Journal de l'agriculture .

In 1848, he took part in the French Revolution of 1848 alongside François Arago. However, he was compromised during the insurrection of June 13, 1849, led by Considerant and Ledru-Rollin against the intervention of French troops in the Roman Republic. It was perhaps thanks to Bixio that Barral was not prosecuted after his arrest on June 25. In July 1850, Barral and Bixio made a balloon ascent together near Coulommiers to determine the temperature and composition of the air, a feat that caused a huge stir.

Starting in 1849, Barral spent four years compiling François Arago writings under his direction in order to publish his complete works. Then, in 1854, he posthumously published Astronomie populaire, a comprehensive work that served as a model for many popularizers.

He was elected permanent secretary of the Académie d'Agriculture on December 30, 1871, and remained in that position until his death.

He is the father of Georges Barral.

== Partial list of publications ==
- L’Agriculture, les prairies et les irrigations de la Haute-Vienne, Imprimerie nationale, 1884
- Les Irrigations dans le département de Vaucluse : rapport sur le concours ouvert en 1877 pour le meilleur emploi des eaux d'irrigation, Imprimerie nationale, 1878
- Les Irrigations dans le département des Bouches-du-Rhône : rapport sur le concours ouvert en 1875 pour le meilleur emploi des eaux d'irrigation, Imprimerie nationale, 1876
- Avenir de grandes exploitations agricoles établis sur les côtes du Vénézuéla, 1881
