= Jean Arago =

French soldier and general in the Mexican army (1788–1836)

Jean Martin Arago (25 May 1788 – 9 July 1836), known as Jean Arago, was a French soldier who became a general in the Mexican army.

== Biography ==
=== Family ===
Jean Arago was born on 25 May 1788 in Estagel, Roussillon. He was the second of six sons of François Bonaventure Arago and Marie Arago. His older brother François (1786–1853) became an astronomer, physician and French politician. Jacques (1790–1854) took part in Louis de Freycinet's exploring voyage in the Uranie from 1817 to 1821, and on his return to France devoted himself to his journalism and the drama. Victor (1792–1867) was a French soldier. Joseph (1796–1860) became a soldier in the Mexican army. Étienne (1802–1892) is said to have collaborated with Honoré de Balzac in The Heiress of Birague, and from 1822 to 1847 wrote a great number of light dramatic pieces, mostly in collaboration.

=== Military career ===
Jean Arago was Treasurer of the Perpignan Mint during the Second Restoration. He was dismissed and embarked for New Orleans. Taking advantage of his knowledge of military administration acquired from General Duhesme, whose secretary he had been, he joined the Mexican rebels and fought in their ranks during the War of Independence against Spain between 1816 and 1821. Distinguished by his bravery and military skill, he was appointed commander-in-chief in 1818, following a revolt of the officer corps against Father Torres. General Santa Anna owed him many of his early successes. After Ferdinand VII's troops were defeated, he was awarded the rank of general by the victors.

In 1836, suffering from dropsy, Arago took part in the Texas Expedition. However, in the last days of June, he returned to Mexico City, where he died on 9 July 1836.

== See also ==
- Mexican War of Independence

== Bibliography ==
- Sarda, François (2011). "Arago (Jean, Martin". Nouveau Dictionnaire de biographies roussillonnaises 1789-2011, vol. 1 Pouvoirs et société, t. 1 (A-L) [New Dictionary of Roussillon Biographies 1789-2011, vol. 1 Powers and Society, t. 1 (A-L)] (in French). Perpignan: Publications de l'olivier. ISBN 9782908866414.
