= Félix Savary =

French astronomer (1797–1841)

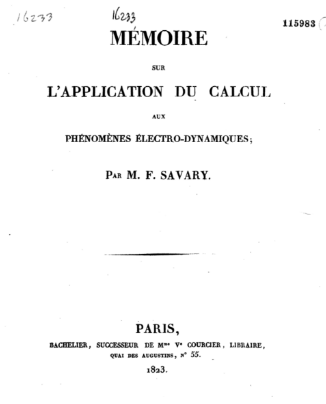

Félix Savary, who was born on 4 October 1797 in Paris and died on 15 July 1841 in Estagel, was a French astronomer.

He studied at the École Polytechnique, where he was later a professor of astronomy. He was a librarian at the Bureau des Longitudes between 1823 and 1829, and was elected to the French Academy of Sciences on 24 December 1832.

In his works Mémoire sur les orbites des étoiles doubles and Sur la détermination des orbites que décrivent autour de leur centre de gravité deux étoiles très rapprochées l'une de l'autre, published in 1827, he was the first to use observations of a visual binary star to calculate the orbit of one star about the other. He applied his method to the star ξ Ursae Majoris.

He worked with Ampère, publishing in 1823 the work Mémoire sur l'application du calcul aux phénomènes électro-dynamiques.

== See also ==
- LC circuit
