= Victor Arago =

French soldier (1792–1867)

Pierre Jean Victor Arago (8 April 1792 – 11 April 1867), known as Victor Arago, was a French soldier, and one of the six Arago brothers.

== Early life and education ==
Victor Arago was born on 8 April 1792 in Estagel, Roussillon. He was the eighth child of François Bonaventure Arago and Marie Arago, and the fourth of six sons. His brother François (1786–1853) became an astronomer, physician and French politician. Jean (1788–1836), was Treasurer of the Perpignan Mint, and then became a general in Mexico. Jacques (1790–1854) took part in Louis de Freycinet's exploring voyage in the Uranie from 1817 to 1821, and on his return to France devoted himself to his journalism and drama. Joseph (1796–1860) became a soldier in the Mexican army. Étienne (1802–1892) is said to have collaborated with Honoré de Balzac on The Heiress of Birague, and from 1822 to 1847 wrote a number of light dramatic pieces, mostly in collaboration.

Victor Arago was a graduate of the École Polytechnique, where he completed brilliant studies before leaving to fight in Spain, and then followed various military assignments in France.

== Military career ==
In 1832, he performed a memorable feat of arms during the Siege of Antwerp: despite being in difficult circumstances, he and his men managed to be the first into the citadel without losing a single man. The Duke of Orléans, to whom he was presented for this feat, exclaimed, "You can see it clearly, he's an Arago."

In 1848, he failed to become a deputy for the Pyrénées-Orientales: three of his brothers already had seats, and it was objected that this would be "too much Arago." He became commander of the Perpignan garrison, then of the Île d'Aix garrison. Little is known about his daily military life, as the archives concerning him have been lost.

Remaining close to his family, he financially supported his brother Étienne when he struggled to maintain his theatre.

He married Charlotte Claire Vorget de Voislemont in 1803, and they had two sons: Victor Joseph Arago (born 1832), who became captain in the 9th Line Infantry Regiment in 1867, and lived in Paris; and Nicolas Emmanuel Arago (born 1840), tobacco entrepreneur in Versailles, who lived there.

== Death ==
A retired artillery major at his death and Officer of the Légion d'honneur, he died at his home at 60 rue du Plessis in Versailles on 11 April 1867.

== Bibliography ==
- Frénay, Étienne (2009). "Victor, officier français, Jean et Joseph, officiers mexicains". Les Arago, acteurs de leur temps (actes du colloque de Perpignan, 2003) [The Arago, actors of their time (proceedings of the Perpignan conference, 2003)] (in French). Perpignan: Archives départementales des Pyrénées-orientales. ISBN 978-2-86066-039-6.
- Sarda, François (2011). "Arago (Pierre, Jean, Victor)". Nouveau Dictionnaire de biographies roussillonnaises 1789-2011, vol. 1 Pouvoirs et société, t. 1 (A-L) [New Dictionary of Roussillon Biographies 1789–2011, vol. 1 Powers and Society, t. 1 (A-L)] (in French). Perpignan: Publications de l'olivier. ISBN 9782908866414.
- Sarda, François (2002). Les Arago : François et les autres [The Arago: François and the others] (in French). Paris: Tallandier. ISBN 9782847340051.
- The personal papers of the Arago family are kept in the French National Archives under the code 348AP. They can be consulted in the form of microfilms.
