= Joseph Arago =

French soldier in the Mexican army (1796–1860)

Joseph Honoré Arago
- Born: 2 June 1796; Estagel, Roussillon, France
- Died: 19 September 1860 (aged 64) Tacubaya, Mexico
- Allegiance: France, Mexico
- Branch: Army
- Service years: 1815, 1818 - c.1857
- Rank: Colonel
- Conflicts: Peninsular War

Joseph Honoré Arago (2 June 1796 – 19 September 1860), known as Joseph Arago, was a French soldier in the Mexican army.

== Biography ==
=== Family ===
Joseph Arago was born on 2 June 1796 in Estagel, Roussillon. He was the ninth child of François Bonaventure Arago and Marie Arago, and the fifth of their six sons. His brother François (1786–1853) became an astronomer, physician and French politician. Jean (1788–1836) was cashier of the mint of Perpignan, and then a general in the Mexican army. Jacques (1790–1854) took part in Louis de Freycinet's exploring voyage in the Uranie from 1817 to 1821, and on his return to France devoted himself to his journalism and the drama. Victor (1792–1867) was a French soldier. Étienne (1802–1892) is said to have collaborated with Honoré de Balzac in The Heiress of Birague, and from 1822 to 1847 wrote a great number of light dramatic pieces, mostly in collaboration.

=== Military career ===
Arago served in the Grande Armée and was discharged in 1815. He returned to service in 1818, participated in the Peninsular War from 1823 to 1825, and rose in rank to become a lieutenant.

In October 1827, he left for Mexico to join his brother Jean Arago, then a colonel in the Mexican army. On Jean's recommendation, Joseph was promoted to lieutenant in 1828. After two years of leave due to ill health, he was promoted to cavalry captain in 1832, while stationed in Veracruz under the command of General Santa Anna. In 1836, he married and in 1840 became aide-de-camp to the President of Mexico, Anastasio Bustamante, who appointed him major. The multiple changes at the head of Mexico had no impact on his career, but it was interrupted several times by his being forced to take leave to treat his fragile health. He ended it with the rank of colonel.

He suffered from diabetes and became blind, like several other members of his family (including his brothers François and Jacques). In 1852, already ill, he was given command of the fort of Perote, near Veracruz. With the accession to power of Benito Juárez and the beginning of the War of Reform in 1857, a period of confusion ensued. Joseph Arago was wrongly accused of having wanted to surrender the fort to the supporters of Félix María Zuloaga. Sentenced to death, he narrowly escaped the firing squad. Having been cleared, he then recovered his post.

He died on 19 September 1860 in Tacubaya.

== Bibliography ==
- Frénay, Étienne (2009). "Victor, officier français, Jean et Joseph, officiers mexicains". Les Arago, acteurs de leur temps (actes du colloque de Perpignan, 2003) [The Arago, actors of their time (proceedings of the Perpignan conference, 2003)] (in French). Perpignan: Archives départementales des Pyrénées-orientales. ISBN 978-2-86066-039-6.
- Sarda, François (2011). "Arago (Joseph, Honoré)". Nouveau Dictionnaire de biographies roussillonnaises 1789-2011, vol. 1 Pouvoirs et société, t. 1 (A-L) [New Dictionary of Roussillon Biographies 1789–2011, vol. 1 Powers and Society, t. 1 (A-L)] (in French). Perpignan: Publications de l'olivier. ISBN 9782908866414.
- Sarda, François (2002). Les Arago : François et les autres [The Arago: François and the others] (in French). Paris: Tallandier. ISBN 9782847340051.
- The personal papers of the Arago family are kept in the French National Archives under the code 348AP. They can be consulted in the form of microfilms.
