= Jacques Alexandre Bixio =

French politician (1808–1865)

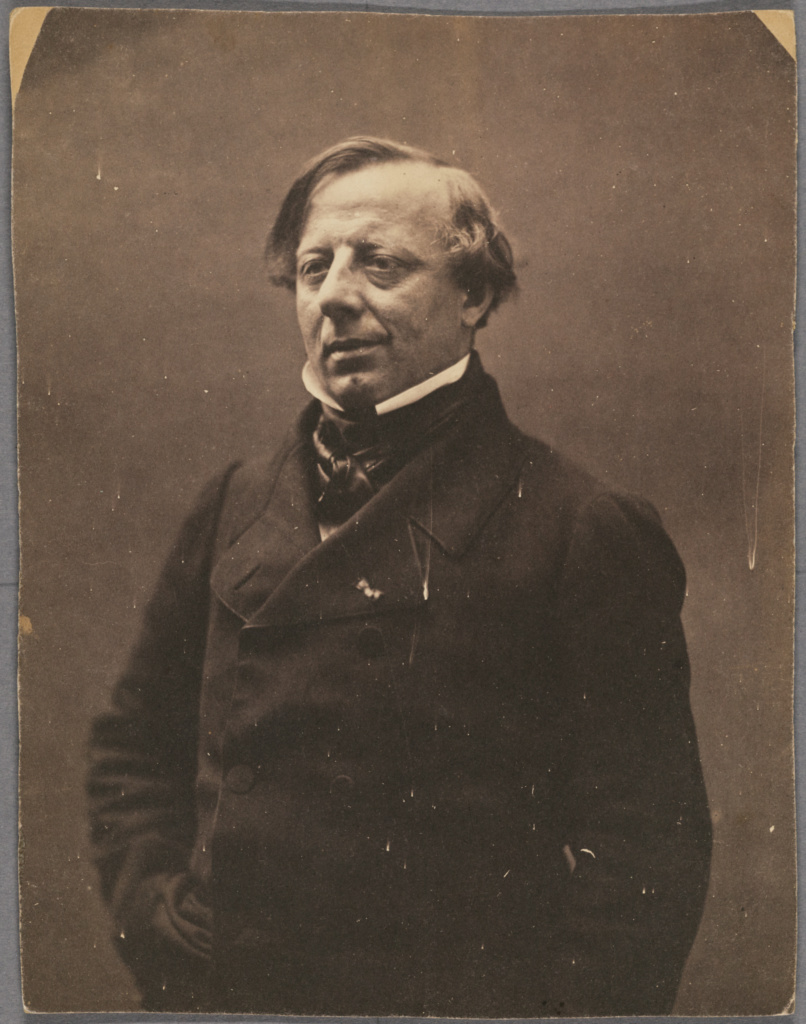
Bixio in the 1850s, by Nadar

Jacques Alexandre Bixio (20 November 1808 – 16 December 1865) was a French medical doctor, balloonist, and politician of Italian origin.

Bxio was born in Chiavari, Italy, and published a number of works relating to agriculture. He was the first minister of agriculture and commerce for Napoleon III of France, but is better remember as a scientific balloonist.

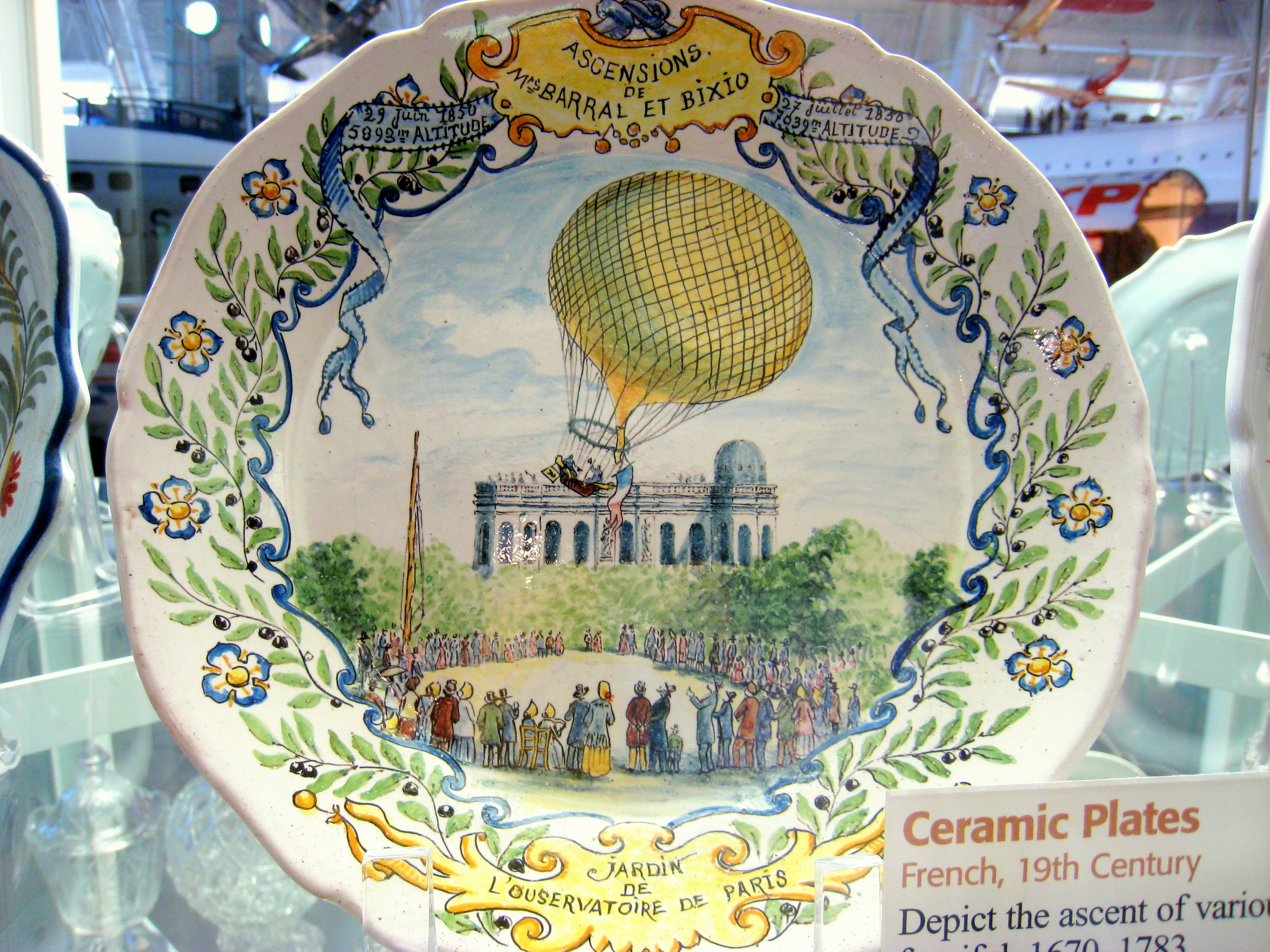
Barral and Bixio balloon ascent, 1850

On 29 June 1850, at 10.27 A.M., Bixio and Jean Augustin Barral made the first of two balloon ascents from the Paris Observatory in a balloon inflated with hydrogen. The first turned out poorly. MM. Bixio and Barral determined to ascend again and on 27 July 1850, they repeated the experiment. The ascent was remarkable on account of the extreme cold at the elevation attained. Bixio died in Paris on 16 December 1865.
