= Arago telescope =

Telescope at Paris Observatory, installed in 1857

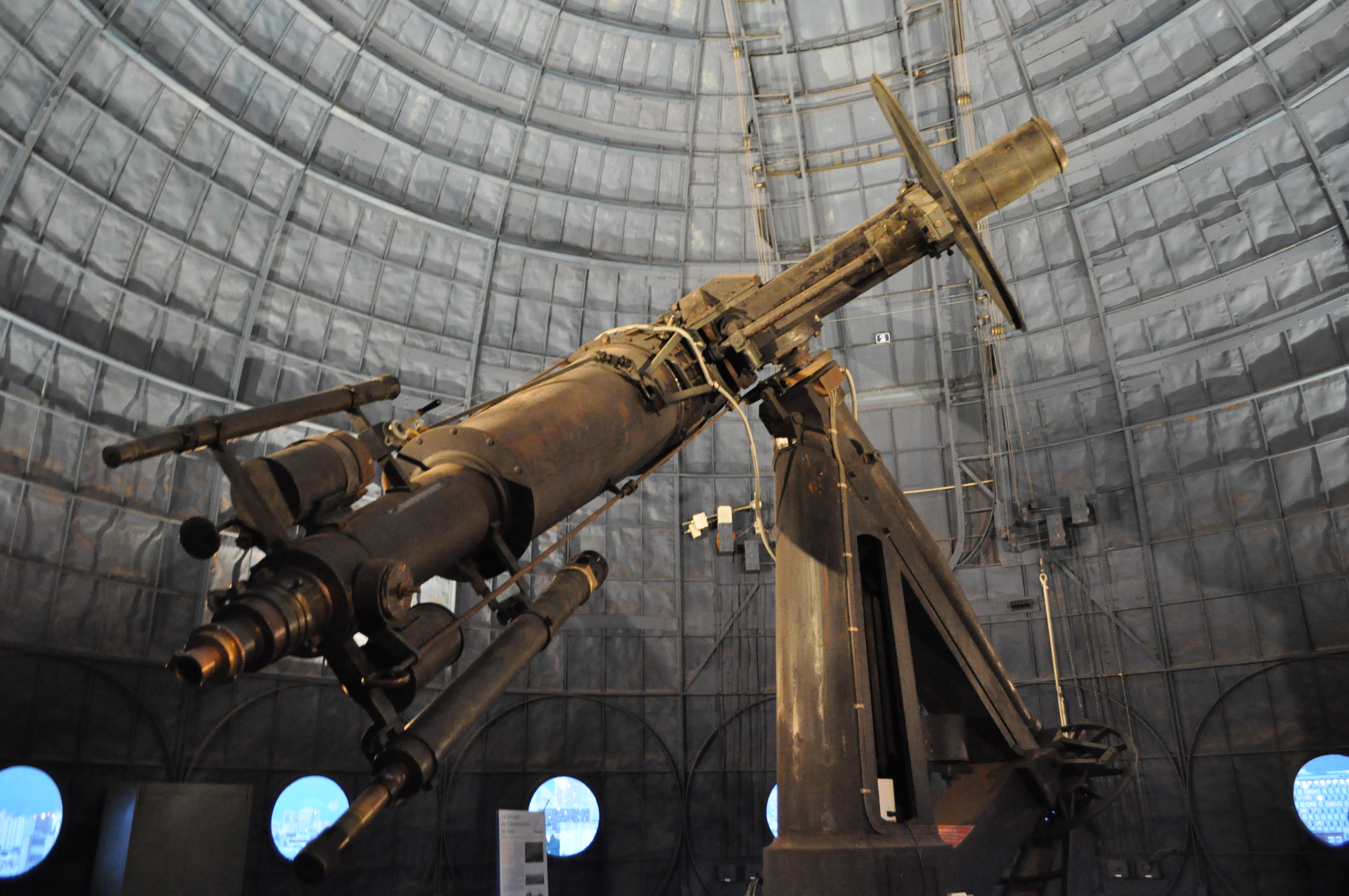
- The refractor in 2012
- Location(s): France
- Coordinates: 48°50′11″N 2°20′13″E
- Diameter: 38 cm (1 ft 3 in)
- Location of Arago telescope
- Related media on Commons

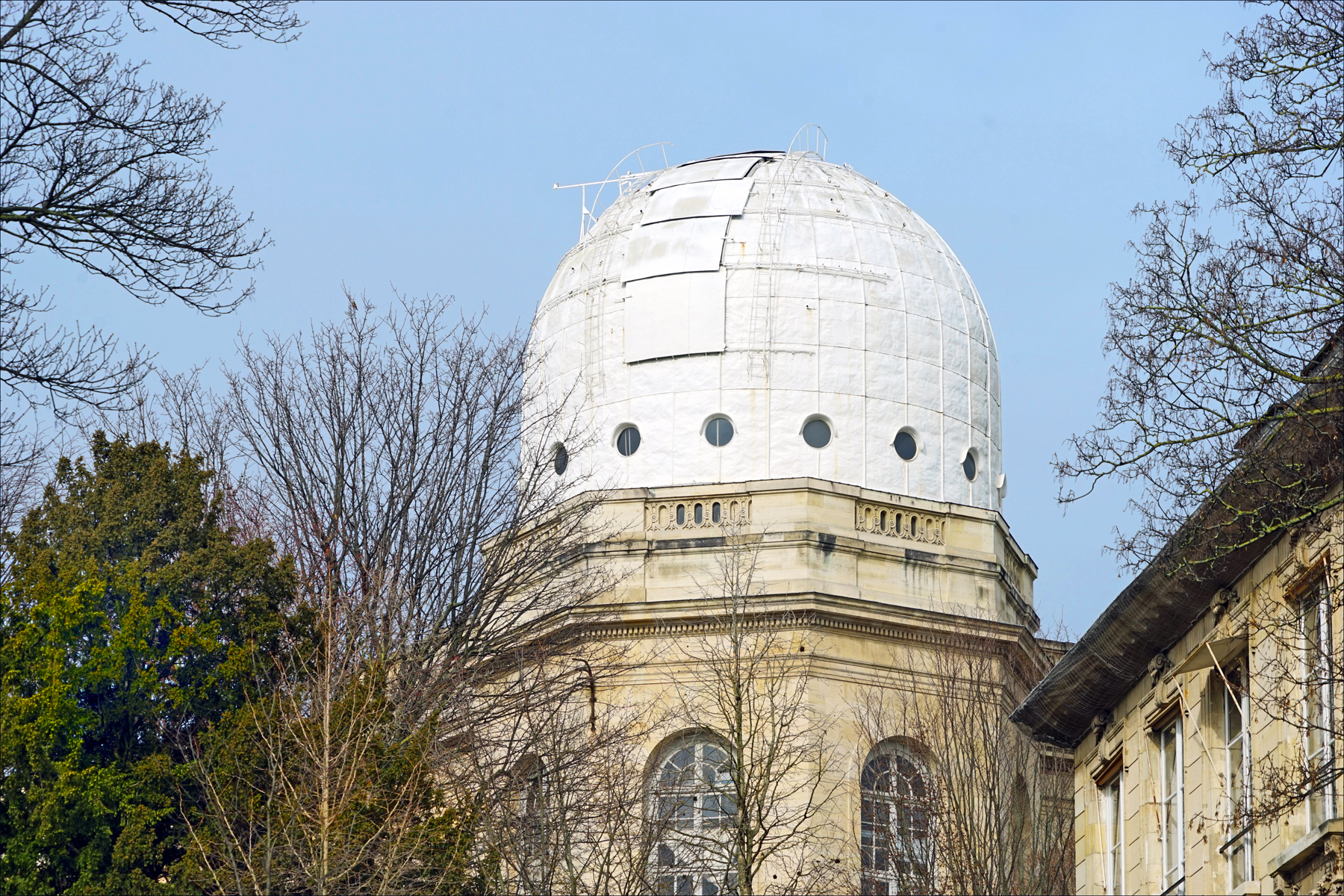
The distinctive Arago dome, perched on the East tower

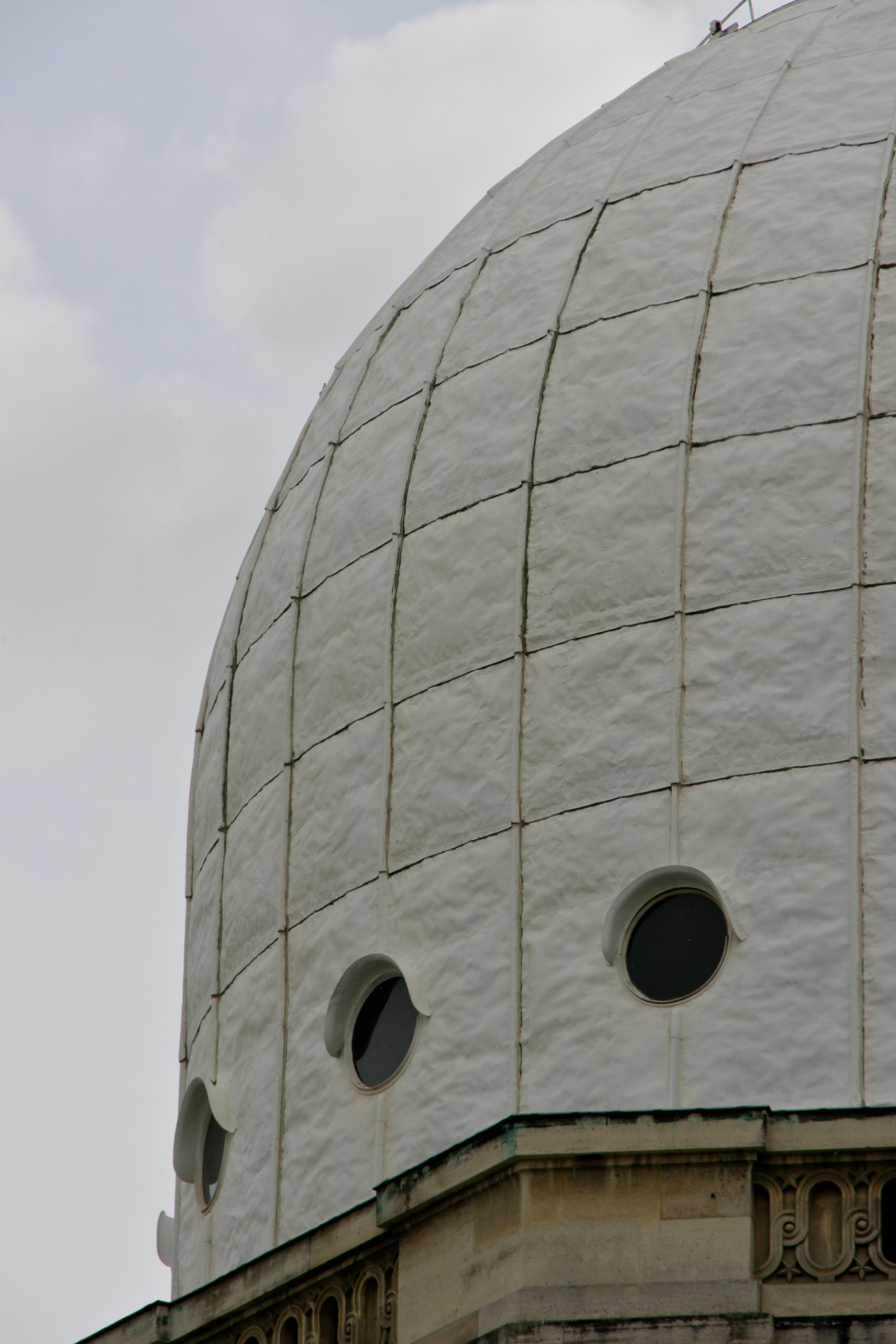
Closer view of the Arago cupola

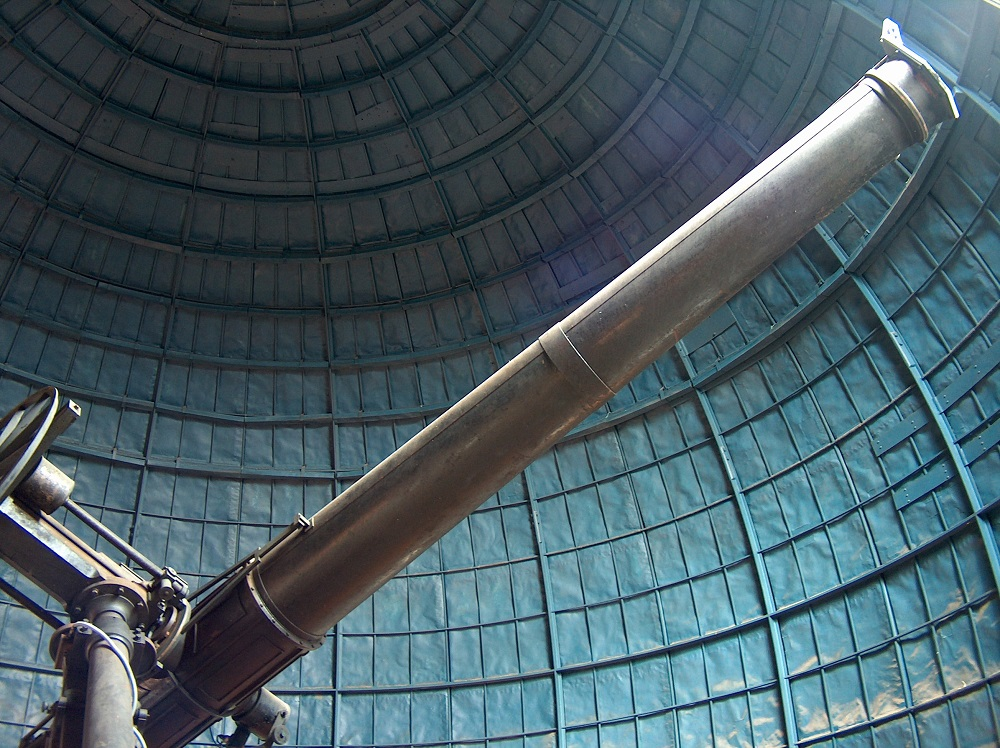
Tube of the telescope backdropped by the inner dome

Arago telescope (Lunette Arago) is a 38 cm (15 inch) aperture refracting telescope at Paris Observatory, installed in 1857. Francois Arago ordered this telescope from the telescope making firm Lebreours in 1839, and after a protracted development was completed by 1855. The name Lunette Arago (Arago refractor) is a modern name for the telescope, and other large refractor of Paris observatory, is the one at Meudon. It has gone by a variety of names having to do with various aspects of the telescope, such as its aperture, or location on the East tower of the Paris observatory, or its equatorial mount made by Brunner. In one journal report it was called the 'east equatorial' for example, in another instance '38 cm refractor'. In French language it has been called the La lunette équatoriale de 38 cm de l'Observatoire de Paris.

The telescope had an objective lens 14 pouces across, which is a name for Paris Inches; this works out to about 38 cm (14.96 (usually rounded to 15) English inches). The original objective was completed by Lerebours by 1844. The equatorial mounting made by Brunner was delivered in 1859. The clock drive for the equatorial was made by Breguet.

The equatorial mounting was not ordered until early 1850s, after the new dome work, completed in 1847, had been finished. The floor of the dome was also designed to move. The telescope was installed in the new east dome built for it, on top of the Paris Observatory building.

There was some issue with the lens, and it was re-polished in 1874. In the early 1880s a new objective lens was installed, made by the Henry Brothers. Also the dome and mounting were modified at that time, including replacing an earlier wooden tube with one of iron.

The telescope is known to have been used for observing double stars, minor planets (asteroids), and also some photographic astronomy in the late 19th century. When it made its debut in the late 1850s, it was noted for its 38 cm (15 inch) Lerebours objective, Brunner mount, and there was some discussion over its use for astro photography.

This telescope is noted for its photometric observations of the Galilean Satellites (Io, Europa, Callisto, and Ganymede) in the 1880s. Corunu and Obrecht would photometrically detect the eclipses of Jupiter by its moons at Paris Observatory.

Some of the photometers it was used with included different types, such as polarizing photometers. Some examples of photometers for the telescope in the late 19th and early 20th century include Photometers R, T, W, and H. Photometer R was a roughly half meter long brass tube, 5 cm in diameter with two prisms inside. The prisms were made of quartz. Photometer T on the other hand had a drum 12.5 cm in diameter and over 17 cm long.

On June 23, 1878 the East Equatorial of Paris Observatory (the Arago) was first used for photometric detection of an eclipse of Jupiter's moons. The telescope was also used to photometrically study double stars with Photometer H.

A Nicol prism was used at the eyepiece for certain instrumentation setups.

Over 1800 double stars were observed with the 38 cm of Paris Obs. between 1966 and 1971.

The telescope was used for PHEMU85. PHEMU85 was international astronomical collaboration to view the moons of Jupiter in 1985.

The Paris Observatory building was significantly modified to support the weight of the new telescope and dome, and modifications included a new cement support structure and a steel lattice to hold the new telescope.

== Dome ==
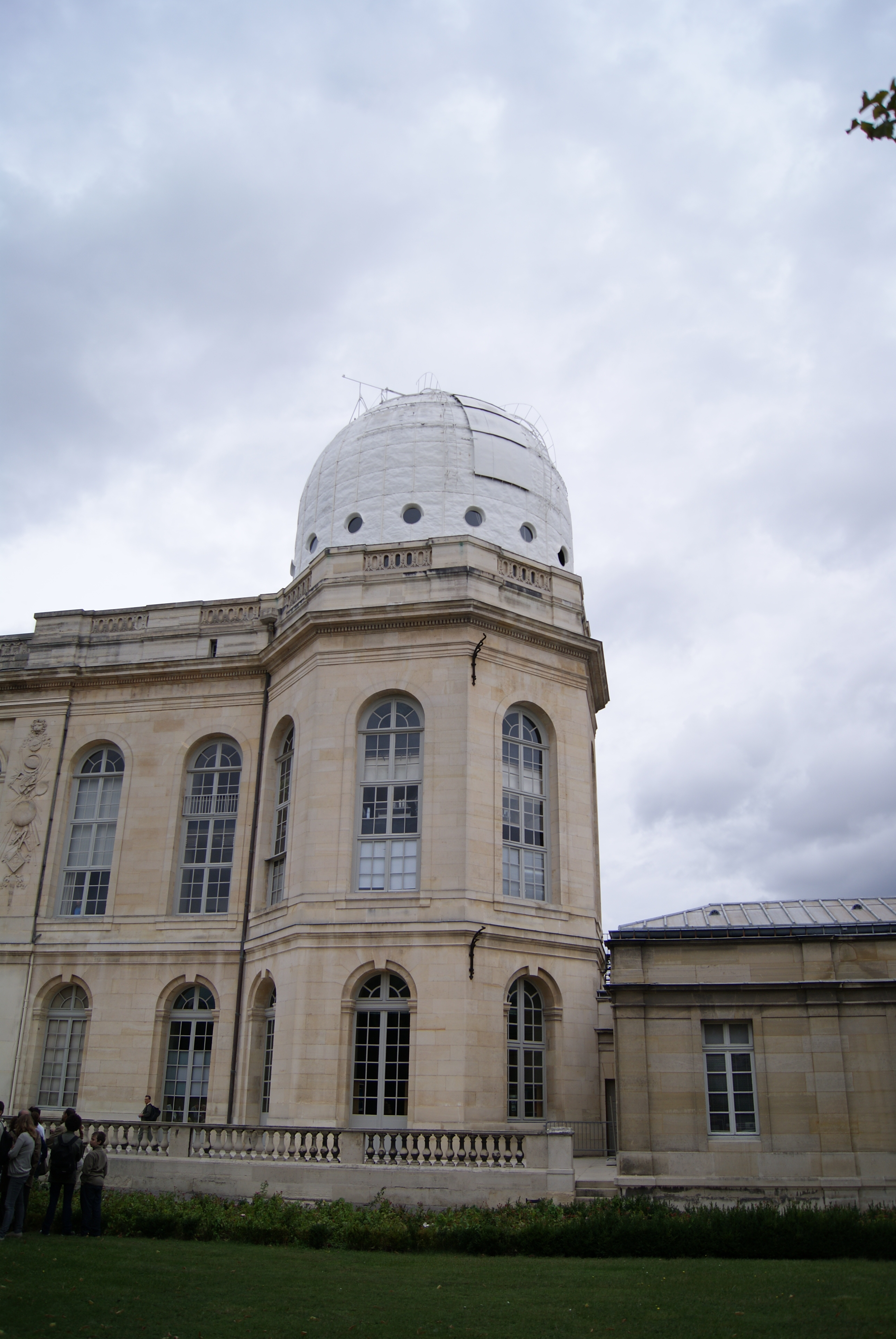
The Arago dome sits atop the octagonal east tower of the observatory

== See also ==
- List of largest optical telescopes of the 19th century
- List of largest optical refracting telescopes
- Arago spot (about the optical phenomenon)
