= USC&GS Arago =

USC&GS Arago was the name of two ships of the United States Coast Survey and the United States Coast and Geodetic Survey, and may refer to:

- USC&GS Arago (1854), a schooner in service in the Coast Survey/Coast and Geodetic Survey from 1854 to 1881
- USC&GS Arago (1871), a steamer in service in the Coast Survey from 1871 to 1878 and in the Coast and Geodetic Survey from 1878 to 1890
