= 1005 Arago =

Asteroid

Discovery
- Discovered by: S. Belyavskyj
- Discovery site: Simeiz Obs.
- Discovery date: 5 September 1923

Designations
- Named after: François Arago (French mathematician)
- Alternative designations: 1923 OT
- Minor planet category: main-belt · (outer)

Orbital characteristics
- Epoch 4 September 2017 (JD 2458000.5)
- Uncertainty parameter 0
- Observation arc: 93.51 yr (34,156 days)
- Aphelion: 3.5381 AU
- Perihelion: 2.7937 AU
- Semi-major axis: 3.1659 AU
- Eccentricity: 0.1176
- Orbital period (sidereal): 5.63 yr (2,058 days)
- Mean anomaly: 206.34°
- Mean motion: 0° 10^{m} 30^{s} / day
- Inclination: 19.060°
- Longitude of ascending node: 349.17°
- Argument of perihelion: 60.660°

Physical characteristics
- Dimensions: 48.57±14.27 km 50.28±15.89 km 52.74±0.89 km 56.36±1.36 km 57.69 km (derived); 57.82±4.9 km 61.132±0.345 km 68.404±0.660 km
- Synodic rotation period: 8.7819±0.0001 h (Note: CALL (2002): Submitted observations to the CALL website with a rotation period 8.7819±0.0001 hours with a brightness amplitude of 0.22 mag. Summary figures for (1005) Arago at Collaborative Asteroid Lightcurve Link (CALL)); 8.784±0.001 h
- Geometric albedo: 0.0498±0.0069; 0.0582 (derived); 0.0697±0.014; 0.070±0.008; 0.074±0.004; 0.08±0.04; 0.08±0.09
- Spectral type: P · C
- Absolute magnitude (H): 9.7 · 9.9 · 9.98

Arago (minor planet designation: 1005 Arago), provisional designation 1923 OT, is a dark asteroid from the outer regions of the asteroid belt, approximately 55 kilometers in diameter. It was discovered on 5 September 1923, by Russian astronomer Sergey Belyavsky at the Simeiz Observatory on the Crimean peninsula. The asteroid was named after French mathematician François Arago.

== Classification and orbit ==
Arago orbits the Sun in the outer main-belt at a distance of 2.8–3.5 AU once every 5 years and 8 months (2,058 days). Its orbit has an eccentricity of 0.12 and an inclination of 19° with respect to the ecliptic. The asteroid's observation arc begins at Uccle Observatory in 1935, twelve years after its official discovery observation at Simeiz.

== Physical characteristics ==
=== Diameter and albedo ===
According to the surveys carried out by the Infrared Astronomical Satellite IRAS, the Japanese Akari satellite, and NASA's Wide-field Infrared Survey Explorer (WISE) with its subsequent NEOWISE mission, Arago measures between 48.57 and 68.404 kilometers (30.180 and 42.504 mi) in diameter and its surface has an albedo between 0.0498 and 0.08. The Collaborative Asteroid Lightcurve Link derives an albedo of 0.0582 and a diameter of 57.69 kilometers (35.85 mi) based on an absolute magnitude of 9.9.

=== Lightcurve ===
In October 2010, a rotational lightcurve of Arago was obtained from photometric observations that was later submitted to the CALL website. Lightcurve analysis gave a rotation period of 8.7819 hours with a brightness amplitude of 0.22 magnitude (U=n.a.). In April 2016, another lightcurve was obtained by the group of Spanish amateur astronomers OBAS. It gave a concurring period of 8.784 hours with an amplitude of 0.22 magnitude (U=3).

=== Spectral type ===
Arago is characterized by WISE as a dark and reddish P-type asteroid. It is also a carbonaceous C-type asteroid as generically assumed by CALL.

== Naming ==
This minor planet was named after French mathematician François Arago (1786–1853) director of the Paris Observatory. He is also honored by an inner ring of Neptune, the crater Arago on the Moon and the crater Arago on Mars. The official naming citation was mentioned in The Names of the Minor Planets by Paul Herget in 1955 (H 96).
