= Arago (manga) =

Japanese manga series

- First tankōbon volume cover

AR∀GO -ロンドン市警特殊犯罪捜査官- (Arago Rondon Shikei Tokushu Hanzai Sōsa-kan)
- Genre: Action; Supernatural
- Manga
- Written by: Takahiro Arai
- Published by: Shogakukan
- Imprint: Shōnen Sunday Comics
- Magazine: Weekly Shōnen Sunday
- Original run: December 23, 2009 – September 21, 2011
- Volumes: 9
- icon

Arago: London Shikei Tokushu Hanzai Sōsa-kan (AR∀GO -ロンドン市警特殊犯罪捜査官-; lit. 'Arago: London Metropolitan Police Special Crimes Investigator') is a Japanese manga series written and illustrated by Takahiro Arai. It was serialized in Shogakukan's shōnen manga magazine Weekly Shōnen Sunday from December 2009 to September 2011, with its chapters collected in nine tankōbon volumes.

== Plot ==
The story centers around twin brothers, Arago and Ewan, whose parents were slaughtered by a monster. Years later, as blood begins to flow again in the streets of London, the vengeful Arago crosses paths with Ewan, who has since become a police officer, just as blood begins to flow again in the streets of London.

== Characters ==
Arago Hunt (アラゴ・ハント, Arago Hanto)
Arago's parents, Doug Hunt and his unnamed mother, are killed by Patchman during his childhood. Separated from his twin brother, Ewan, Arago dedicates himself to hunting down Patchman. Years later, after hearing rumors of the serial killer's return, Arago reunites with Ewan in London to confront him. Despite their efforts, Patchman overpowers them, mortally wounding Ewan. After finally defeating Patchman and avenging his parents, Arago gains unexplained abilities and inherits his brother's arm. Honoring Ewan's legacy, he joins the Metropolitan Police and is later assigned to the Criminal Investigation Department (CID).
Ewan Hunt (ユアン・ハント, Yuan Hanto)
Arago's twin brother. He seeks revenge and indirectly looks for Patchman while becoming an elite cop; unlike Arago who directly searches for Patchman. However, in a meeting with his brother after so long in an attempt to capture Patchman, he gets fatally wounded and died. However, he was resurrected along with Patchman, still retaining some of his mentality as he told Arago to run away.
Rio Butler (リオ・バトラー, Rio Batorā)
Rio, a childhood friend of Arago and Ewan, moves to Japan due to her father's work but returns to London 15 years later. She learns of Ewan's death and Arago's career as a detective, initially distancing herself due to her disapproval of his choices and lingering grief over Ewan, whom she loved. After the ghost bus incident, her attitude softens, and she becomes a close ally, though Arago conceals the supernatural dangers surrounding him. Eventually, he reveals the truth, including his Brionac ability and Ewan's resurrection. Despite her exclusion from the supernatural world, Rio remains one of Arago's most trusted companions.
Joe Sullivan (ジョー・サリバン, Jō Sariban)
The skirt-chasing assistant inspector from the detective department. It seems that Joe has a high opinion about Arago, and as a result recommended him to join the CID. However, he always disappeared into his secret investigation room in the Grey Museum. It is later revealed that Coco is in fact Joe's adopted daughter. He sacrifices his life to save Arago when his brother Ewan (Patchman) tries to kill Arago.
Seth Stringer (セス・ストリンガー, Sesu Sutoringā)
Known as Orc of Oppression and Revolution (抑圧と革命のオルク, Yokuatsu to Kakumei no Oruku), Seth admires William Blake, often quoting his works. Initially appearing as Professor Eames' subordinate, he later reveals himself as Eames' manipulator. Contracted to Orc, he wields Sluagh Ghairm, a horn controlling air and space. Having gained power through a devil's bargain, he battles Arago while seeking the Brionac to destroy "this world of deception", though unable to wield it. He sacrifices himself in Lia Fáil to save Arago, leaving his survival uncertain.
Oswell 'Oz' Miller (オズウェル・ミラー, Ozūeru Mirā)
A member of the Queen's Special Forces, "Albion", the Sacred Guardian Corps. It was revealed that he is the last remaining Albion (the others were killed by Patchman) and his mission is to protect the world's last hope; the Brionac's seed holder, Arago. He was presumably dead after an intense battle with the red horseman; one which he was forced to use the Claiomh Solais' seed (a person without resistance cannot accept the seed's power and will eventually die). However, through an unknown mean, he is still alive and he is capable of depositing the seed out of his body.
Patchman (パッチマン, Patchiman)
He possesses the power Brionac and is the one responsible for Arago's parents' death and, subsequently, his brother Ewan's as well. After Patchman's death, Arago gained his power for unknown reasons. It is later revealed that Patchman had been revived.
Lucian Gardner (ルシアン・ガードナー, Rushian Gādonā)
One of the Four Horsemen who follow Patchman's order. He represents the Pale Horseman, which symbolizes death. He may be French, as he uses various French words when talking. As he symbolizes death, he always appears with his demonic dog (composed of his shadows) appropriately named Hades, the king of the underworld and the god of death.
Scarlet Rabi (スカーレット・ラヴィ, Sukāretto Ravi)
One of the four horsemen that follows the order of Patchman. Scarlet holds the title of the Red Horseman, which symbolizes war. She was to obtain the Claiomh Solais, but failed as she retreated after a battle with Oz, in which she loses the Claiomh Solais' seed to him. She first appeared walking towards the estate of Duke Macdonell. She was killed by Oz; who used the Claiomh Solais' seed on himself who impaled her with the unicorn horn.
Hugh Weissman (ヒュー・ヴァイスマン, Hyū Vaisuman)
One of the Four Horsemen who follow Patchman. Hugh is the White Horseman, who symbolizes conquest, and is first seen looking for Lia Fáil. He was later killed by Seth, after a battle which destroy many parts of London as well as Seth's body.
Simon Cloteaux (サイモン・クロトー, Saimon Kurotō)
Simon, the Black Horseman representing famine, serves as one of Patchman's Four Horsemen. Posing as a police consultant, he operates an upscale clinic catering to wealthy clients while secretly exploiting illegal immigrants to obtain corpses. After merging his body with multiple Gogmagog entities, he is ultimately overpowered and killed by Rio, Coco, and Joe during their confrontation.

== Publication ==
Written and illustrated by Takahiro Arai, Arago was serialized in Shogakukan's shōnen manga magazine Weekly Shōnen Sunday from December 22, 2009, to September 21, 2011. Shogakukan collected its chapters in nine tankōbon volumes, released from March 18, 2010, to January 18, 2012.
