= Jacques Arago =

French writer, artist and explorer (1790–1855)

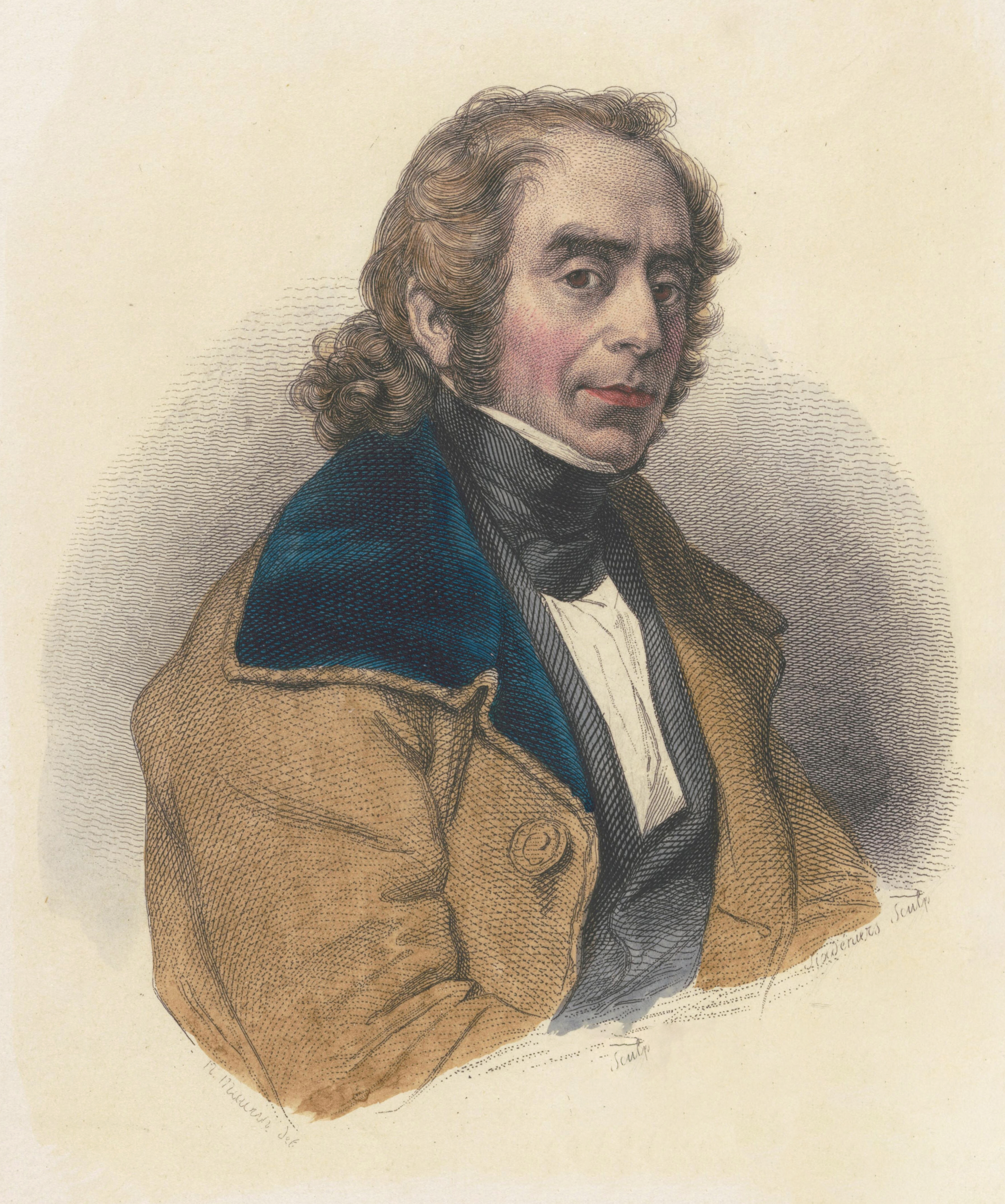
Jacques Arago, (1839), colourised version by Nicolas Eustache Maurin

Jacques Étienne Victor Arago (6 March 1790 – 27 November 1855), known as Jacques Arago, was a French writer, artist and explorer, author of a Voyage Round the World.

== Biography ==
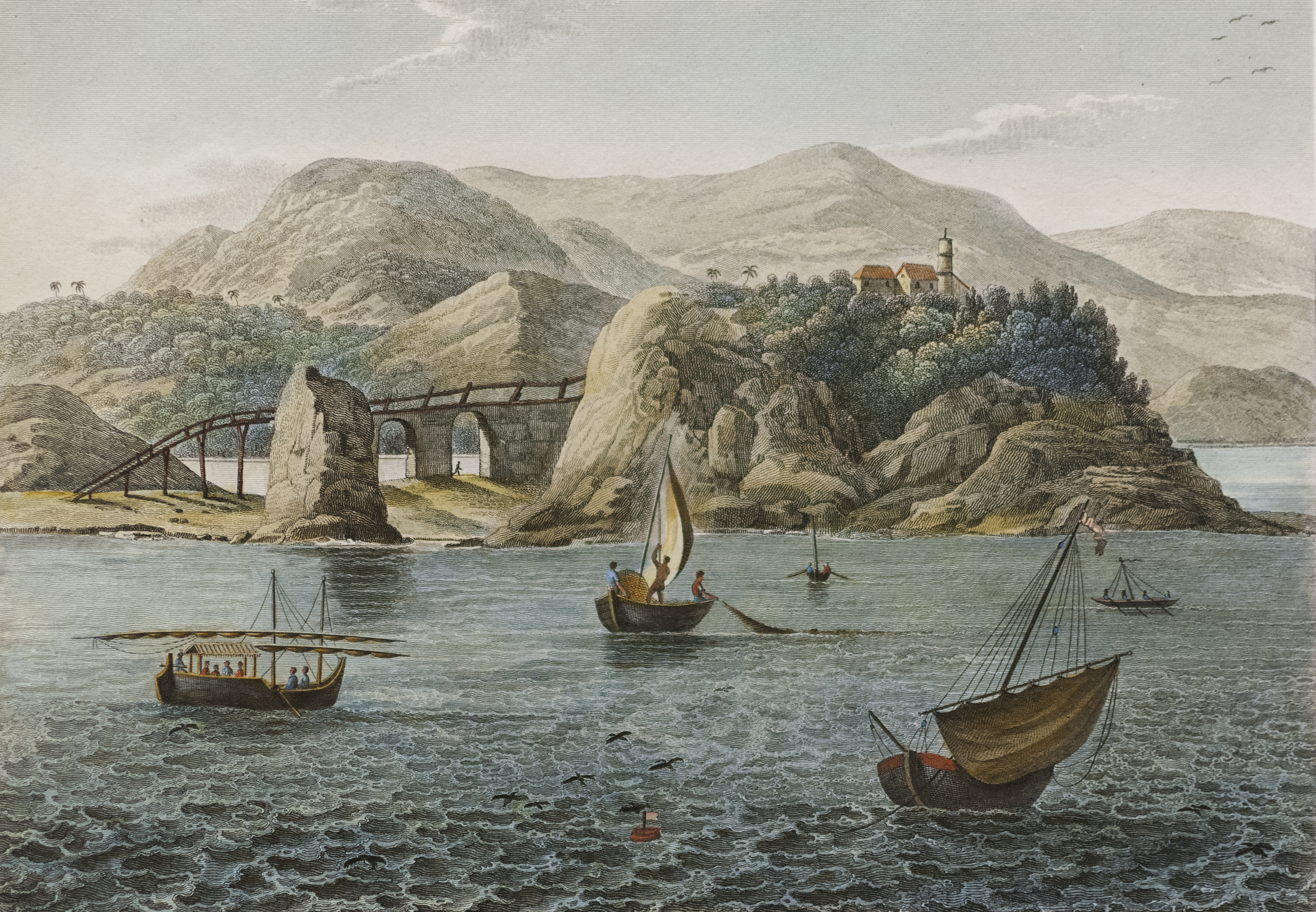
View of Notre Dame De Bon Voyage, Rio de Janeiro

Jacques was born in Estagel, Pyrénées-Orientales. He was the brother of François Arago (1786–1853), a scientist and politician, the most famous of the six Arago brothers. His parents were François Bonaventure Arago (1754–1814) and Marie Arago (1755–1845). His four other brothers were Jean Arago (1788–1836), who became a general in the Mexican army; Victor Arago (1792-1867), a soldier in France; Joseph Arago (1796-1860), also a soldier in France and Mexico; and Étienne Arago (1802–1892), a writer and politician.

Jacques Arago joined Louis de Freycinet as an artist when he left Toulon in 1817 in command of a scientific voyage around the world aboard the corvette Uranie. The expedition returned in 1820 and Arago was the first to publish an account, the Promenade autour du monde, in the form of letters to a friend named Battle, in 1822. An English translation followed in 1823. He continued to expand on his adventures in further editions and in the late 1830s published a much longer version under the title Souvenirs d'un Aveugle (Memoirs of a Blind Man). There are significant differences from the Promenade and the reliability is in doubt. Having been given a challenge many years later by a lady at a social dinner, he then published Voyage autour du monde, sans la lettre A (Voyage around the world, without the letter A), later known as Curieux voyage autour du monde, in 1853, where he tells of his round trip lipogrammatically, that is, without once using the letter "A". The lady replied with a letter without the letter C.

On the Freycinet expedition to Hawaii in 1819, Arago "showed Riouriou a Camera obscura," the first such ever seen in the Hawaiian islands.

Although Arago lost his sight in 1837, he went on travelling and writing for the theater.

He died in Rio de Janeiro, Brazil. Over forty of his drawings were donated to the Honolulu Museum of Art by Frances Damon Holt.

== Works ==
- 1822 : Promenade autour du monde pendant les années 1817, 1818, 1819 et 1820, sur les corvettes du Roi L'Uranie et La Physicienne, commandées par M. Freycinet

=== Plays ===
- 1825 : Le Compagnon d'infortune ou les Prisonniers, by Emmanuel Théaulon and Jacques Arago
- 1832 : Le Duc de Reichstadt, by Louis Lurine and Jacques Arago
- 1834 : Les Papillotes, by Jacques-François Ancelot and Jacques Arago
- 1834 : Un noviciat diplomatique
- 1836 : Le Cadet de Gascogne, by Léon Buquet and Jacques Arago
- 1837 : Un mois à Naples, by Duplessy and Jacques Arago
- 1838 : Mademoiselle d’Alvigny, lieutenant de dragons
- 1840 : Le Camélia, by Édouard Gouin and Jacques Arago
- 1840 : L’Éclat de rire, by Alexandre Martin and Jacques Arago

=== Essays ===
- 1824 : Collection de proverbes et bons-mots
- 1824 : Aux jeunes poètes de l'époque
- 1827 : Le Fond du sac ou les Rognures de la censure
- 1829 : Promenades historiques, philosophiques et pittoresques dans le département de la Gironde

== Gallery ==
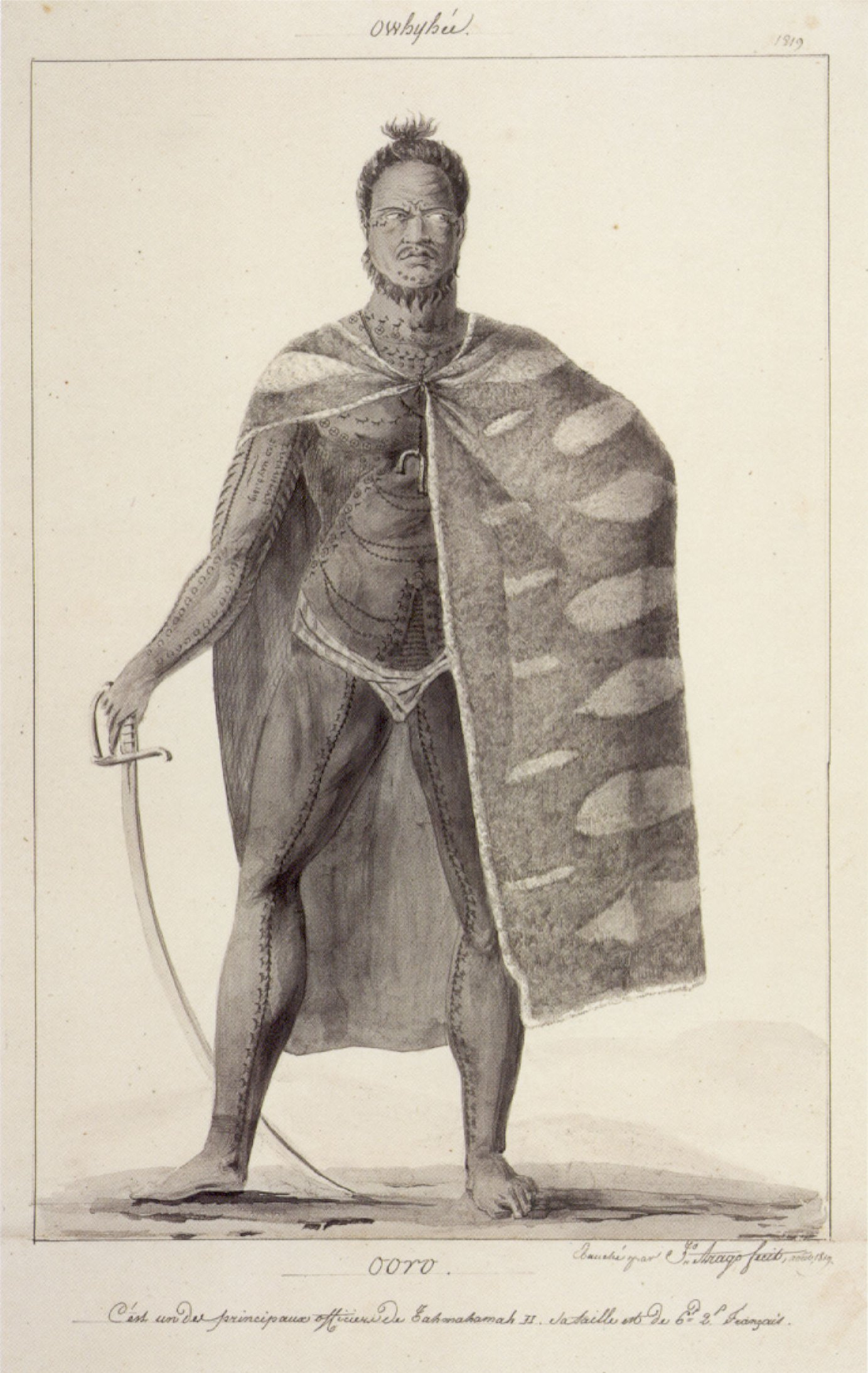
Ooro, One of the Principal Officers of Kamehameha II, pen and ink wash over graphite, 1819, Honolulu Museum of Art

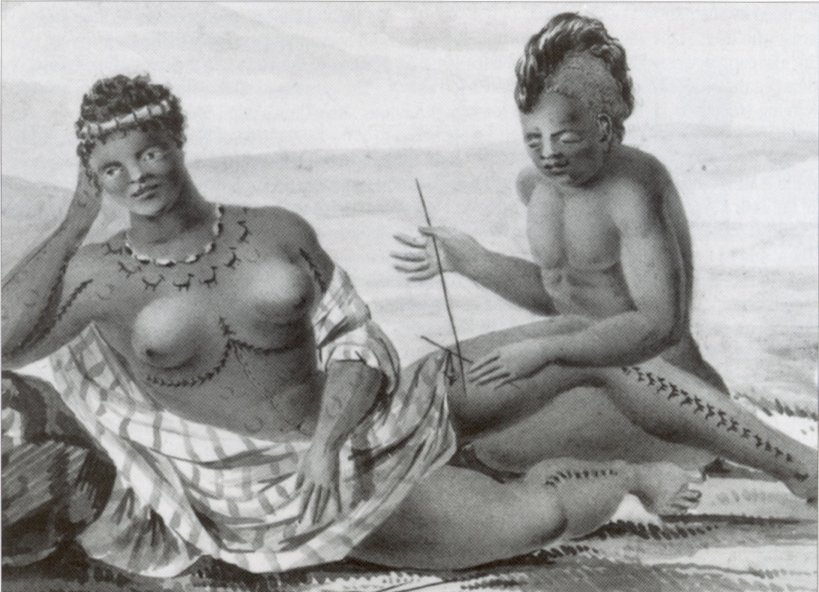
Tattooing, Sandwich Islands, Honolulu Museum of Art

== See also ==
- François Arago
- Circumnavigation
- European and American voyages of scientific exploration
