= Étienne Arago =

French writer and politician (1802–1892)

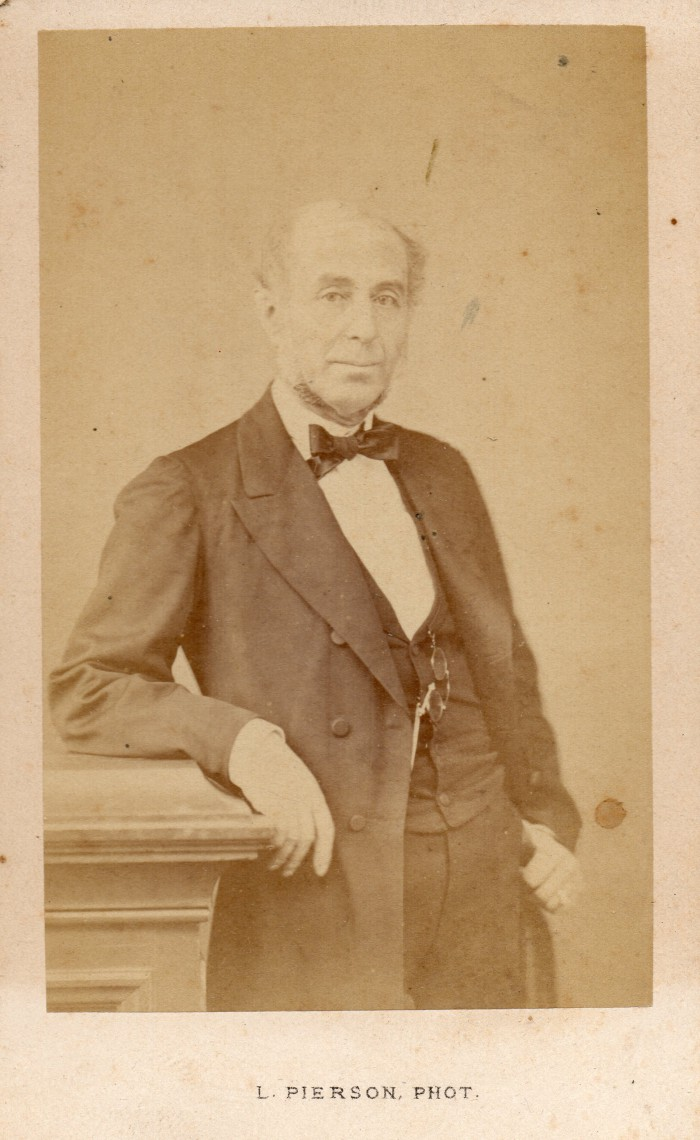
Portrait by Pierre-Louis Pierson

Étienne Vincent Arago (9 February 1802 – 7 March 1892), known as Étienne Arago, was a French writer and politician, and co-founder (with Maurice Alhoy) of the newspaper Le Figaro.

== Early life ==
Arago was born on 9 February 1802 in Perpignan. His parents were François Bonaventure Arago (1754–1814) and Marie Arago (1755–1845). He was the youngest of the six Arago brothers. His brother François (1786–1853) became an astronomer, physician and French politician. Jean (1788–1836) emigrated to North America and became a general in the Mexican army. Jacques (1790–1854) took part in Louis de Freycinet's exploring voyage in the Uranie from 1817 to 1821, and on his return to France devoted himself to his journalism and the drama. Victor (1792–1867) was a French soldier. Joseph (1796–1860) became a soldier in the Mexican army.

He entered the École Polytechnique but left due to involvement with the Carbonari.

== Career ==
He pursued literary interests and was an acquaintance of Honoré de Balzac (they co-wrote an unsuccessful novel, The Heiress of Birague). In 1829, he became director of the Théâtre du Vaudeville; it closed in 1838, leaving him with considerable debts.

In February 1848, during the Revolution of that year, he became director of the national post office. He was active in political movements and opposed Napoleon III, and was in exile in Belgium from 1849 to 1859. He briefly served as mayor of Paris, for two months in 1870, during the Franco-Prussian War. Later, he was involved in a diplomatic mission to Italy.

He died on 7 March 1892 in Paris.
