= Bureau des Longitudes =

The Bureau des Longitudes (French: [byʁo de lɔ̃ʒityd]) is a French scientific institution, founded by decree of 25 June 1795 and charged with the improvement of nautical navigation, standardisation of time-keeping, geodesy and astronomical observation. During the 19th century, it was responsible for synchronizing clocks across the world. It was headed during this time by François Arago and Henri Poincaré. The Bureau now functions as an academy and still meets monthly to discuss topics related to astronomy.

The Bureau was founded by the National Convention after it heard a report drawn up jointly by the Committee of Navy, the Committee of Finances and the Committee of State education. Henri Grégoire had brought to the attention of the National Convention France's failing maritime power and the naval mastery of England, proposing that improvements in navigation would lay the foundations for a renaissance in naval strength. As a result, the Bureau was established with authority over the Paris Observatory and all other astronomical establishments throughout France. The Bureau was charged with taking control of the seas away from the English and improving accuracy when tracking the longitudes of ships through astronomical observations and reliable clocks.

The ten original members of its founding board were:

- Joseph-Louis Lagrange, geometer;
- Pierre-Simon Laplace, geometer;
- Joseph Jérôme Lefrançais de Lalande, astronomer;
- Pierre Méchain, astronomer;
- Jean Baptiste Joseph Delambre, astronomer;
- Dominique, comte de Cassini, astronomer;
- Jean-Charles de Borda, Navy officer;
- Jean-Nicolas Buache, geographer;
- Louis Antoine de Bougainville, Navy officer;
- Noël Simon Caroché, manufacturer of telescopes.

By a decree of 30 January 1854, the Bureau's mission was extended to embrace geodesy, time standardisation and astronomical measurements. This decree granted independence to the Paris Observatory, separating it from the Bureau, and focused the efforts of the Bureau on time and astronomy. The Bureau was successful at setting a universal time in Paris via air pulses sent through pneumatic tubes. It later worked to synchronize time across the French colonial empire by determining the length of time for a signal to make a round trip to and from a French colony.

The French Bureau of Longitude established a commission in the year 1897 to extend the metric system to the measurement of time. They planned to abolish the antiquated division of the day into hours, minutes, and seconds, and replace it by a division into tenths, thousandths, and hundred-thousandths of a day. This was a revival of a dream that was in the minds of the creators of the metric system at the time of the French Revolution a hundred years earlier. Some members of the Bureau of Longitude commission introduced a compromise proposal, retaining the old-fashioned hour as the basic unit of time and dividing it into hundredths and ten-thousandths. Poincaré served as secretary of the commission and took its work very seriously, writing several of its reports. He was a fervent believer in a universal metric system. But he lost the battle. The rest of the world outside France gave no support to the commission's proposals, and the French government was not prepared to go it alone. After three years of hard work, the commission was dissolved in 1900.

Since 1970, the board has been constituted with 13 members, 3 nominated by the Académie des Sciences. Since 1998, practical work has been carried out by the Institut de mécanique céleste et de calcul des éphémérides.

== Publications ==
- Connaissance des temps, astronomical ephemerides, published annually since 1679;
- Annuaire du Bureau des longitudes, almanac and calendar for public and civil use, published annually since 1795;
- Éphémérides nautiques, (from 1889) for marine navigation;
- Éphémérides aéronautiques, (from 1938) for civil and military aerial navigation.
- Procès-verbaux du Bureau des longitudes

== See also ==
- Institut de mécanique céleste et de calcul des éphémérides
- History of longitude
- List of astronomical societies
