= Claude-Louis Mathieu =

French astronomer (1783–1875)

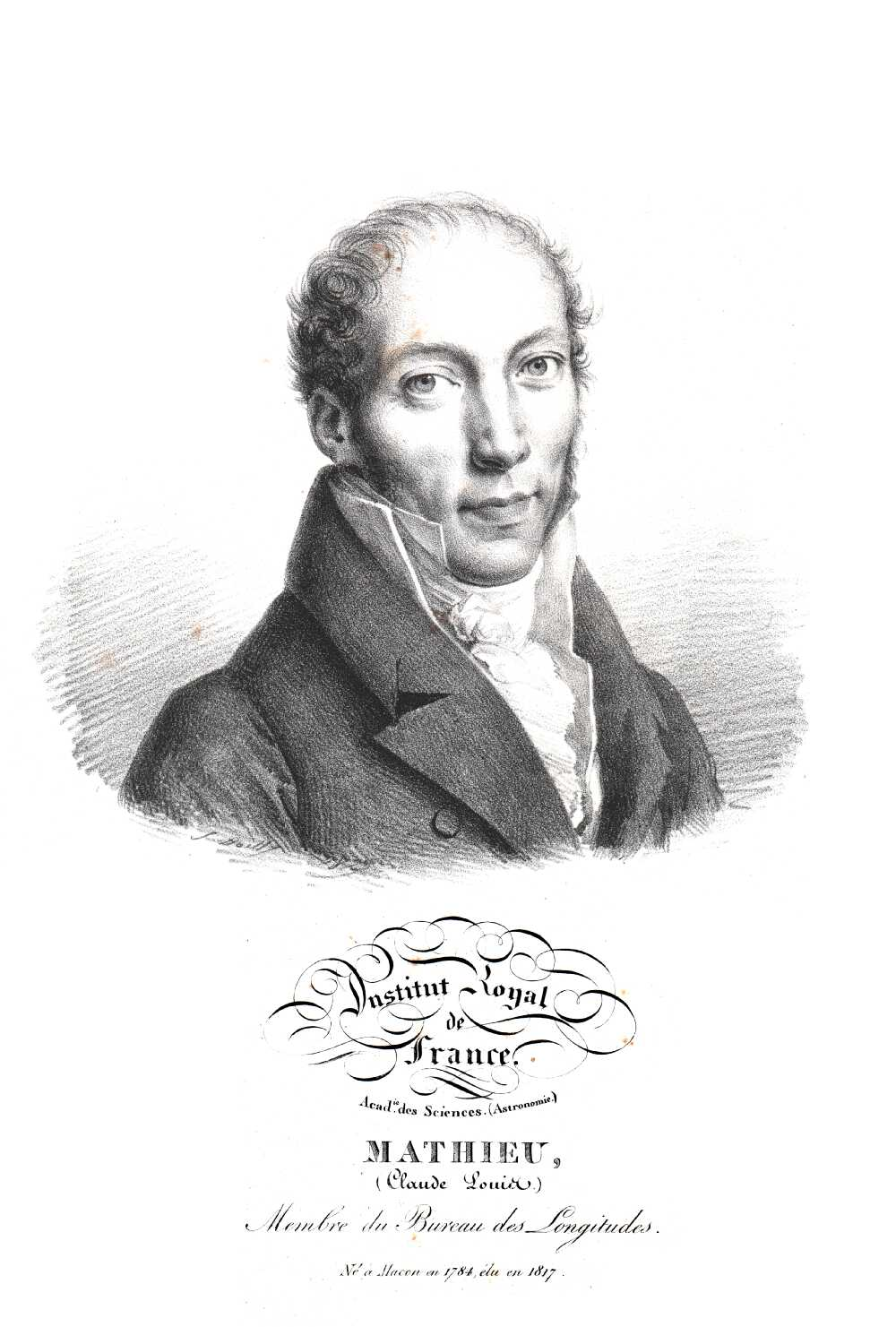
- Claude-Louis Mathieu
- Born: 25 November 1783; Mâcon
- Died: 5 March 1875 (aged 91); Paris
- Known for: distance of the stars
- Awards: Lalande Prize (1808), (1815)
- Scientific career
- Fields: mathematics astronomy
- Workplaces: Bureau des Longitudes

Claude-Louis Mathieu (25 November 1783 – 5 March 1875) was a French mathematician and astronomer who began his career as an engineer. He worked with the Bureau des Longitudes and tried to determine the distance of the stars.

Awarded the Lalande Prize twice, in 1808 and 1815.
