= Estagel =

Estagel Estagell
- Commune
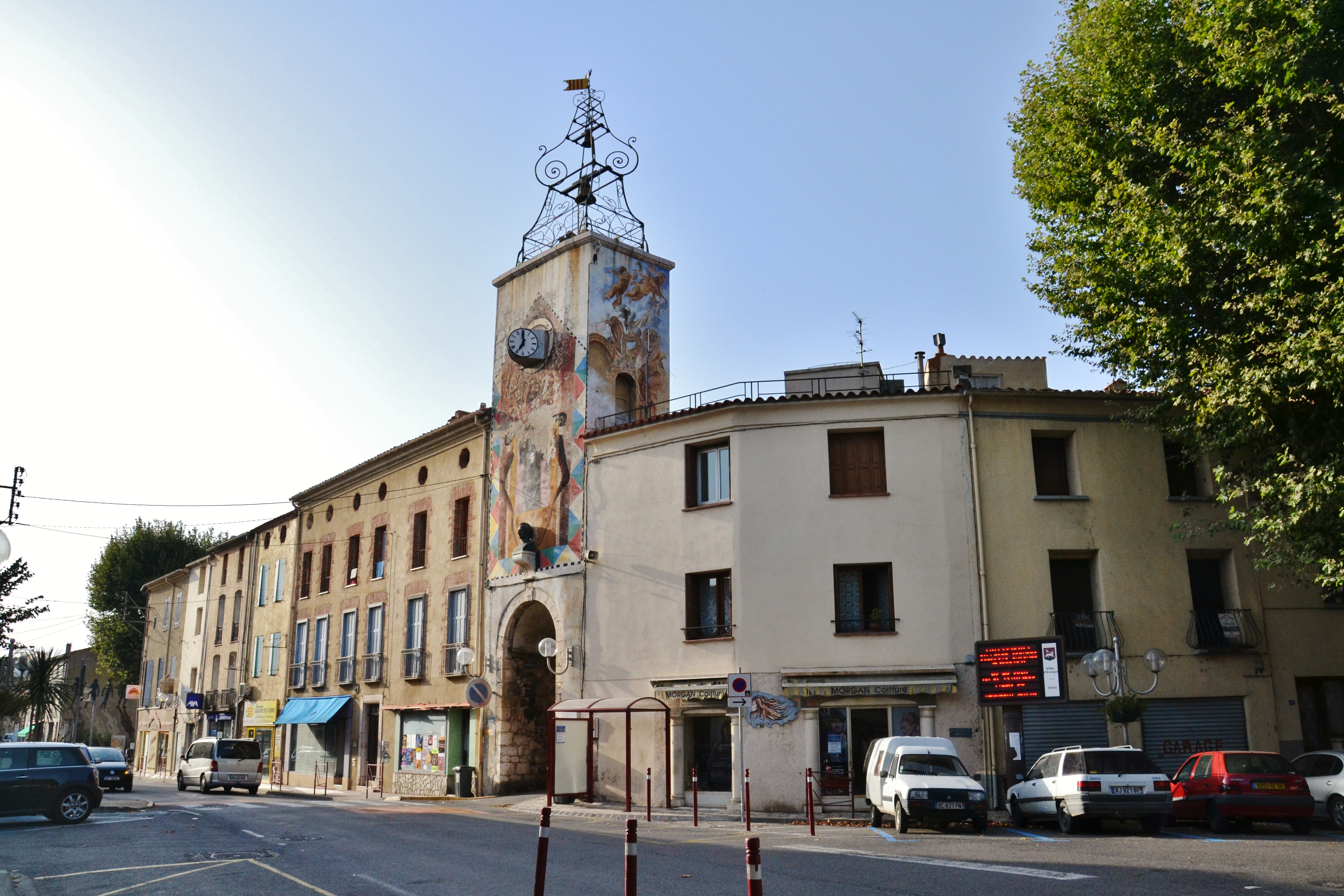
- The clock tower in Estagel

- Coat of arms
- Location of Estagel
- Location within France Location within Occitanie
- Coordinates: 42°46′24″N 2°41′58″E
- Country: France
- Region: Occitania
- Department: Pyrénées-Orientales
- Arrondissement: Perpignan
- Canton: La Vallée de l'Agly
- Intercommunality: Perpignan Méditerranée Métropole

Government
  - Mayor (2020–2026): Roger Ferrer
- Area^{1}: 20.83 km^{2} (8.04 sq mi)
- Elevation: 77 m (253 ft)
- Highest elevation: 325 m (1,066 ft)
- Lowest elevation: 58 m (190 ft)
- Population (2023): 2,160
  - Density: 104/km^{2} (269/sq mi)
- Time zone: UTC+01:00 (CET)
  - Summer (DST): UTC+02:00 (CEST)
- INSEE/Postal code: 66071 /66310
- ^{1} French Land Register data, which excludes lakes, ponds, glaciers > 1 km^{2} (0.386 sq mi or 247 acres) and river estuaries.

Estagel (French pronunciation: [ɛstaʒɛl]; Catalan: Estagell) is a commune in the Pyrénées-Orientales department in southern France.

== Geography ==
=== Localisation ===
Estagel is located in the canton of La Vallée de l'Agly and in the arrondissement of Perpignan.

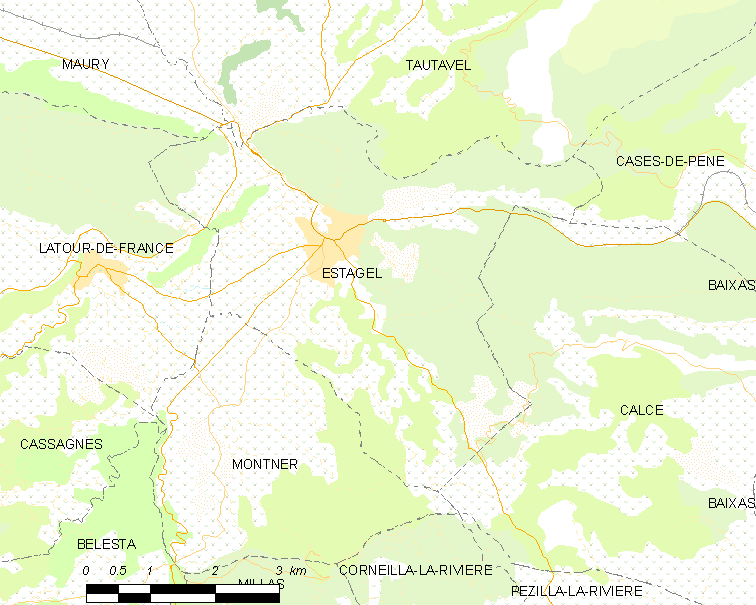
Map of Estagel and its surrounding communes

== Population ==
Historical population
Year	Pop.	±% p.a.
1968	2,201	—
1975	2,021	−1.21%
1982	2,038	+0.12%
1990	2,043	+0.03%
1999	1,941	−0.57%
2007	1,902	−0.25%
2012	1,950	+0.50%
2017	2,016	+0.67%
2023	2,160	+1.16%
Source: INSEE

== Notable people ==
- François Arago (1786-1853), scientist and politician.
- Jacques Arago (1790-1855), writer, artist and explorer.
- Joseph Gaudérique Aymerich (1858-1937), military officer and colonial administrator.

== See also ==
- Communes of the Pyrénées-Orientales department
