= Sara Seager =

Canadian astronomer

Sara Seager OC
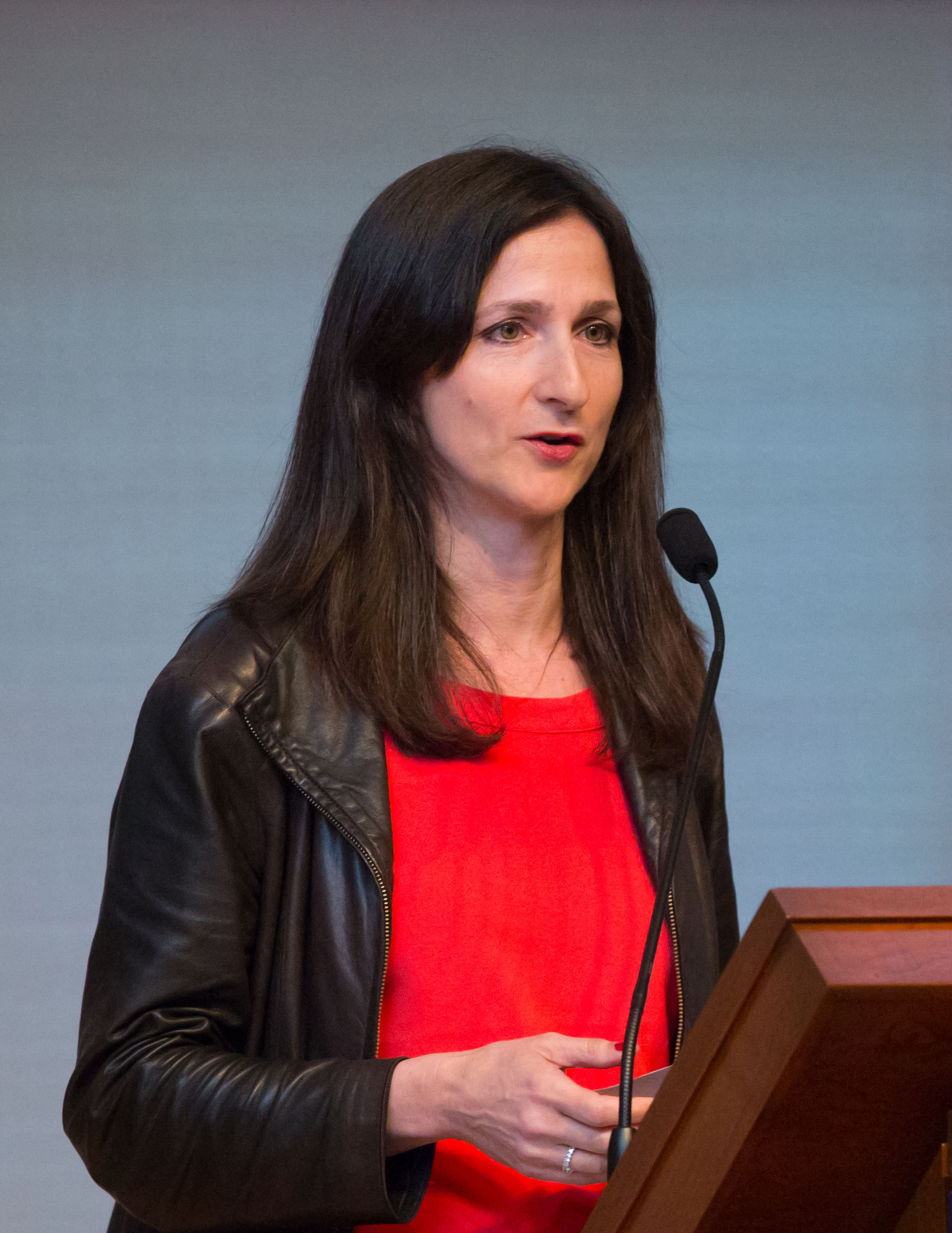
- Seager at a 2016 conference
- Born: July 21, 1971 (age 55); Toronto, Ontario, Canada
- Citizenship: Canada–United States
- Education: University of Toronto (BSc); Harvard University (PhD)
- Known for: Search for extrasolar planets
- Spouses: Mike Wevrick (deceased); Charles Darrow
- Children: 2
- Awards: Order of Canada (2020, Officer); MacArthur Fellowship (2013); Helen B. Warner Prize (2007); Harvard Book Prize in Astronomy (2004); NSERC Science and Technology Fellowship (1990–1994)
- Scientific career
- Fields: Astronomy; Planetary science
- Workplaces: University of Toronto (2026-); Massachusetts Institute of Technology (2006–2026); Carnegie Institution of Washington (2002–2006); Institute for Advanced Study (1999–2002)
- Thesis: Extrasolar giant planets under strong stellar irradiation (1999)
- Doctoral advisor: Dimitar Sasselov
- Website: seagerexoplanets.mit.edu

Sara Seager OC (born July 21, 1971) is a Canadian-American astronomer and planetary scientist. As of October 1, 2026 she is the North Star Distinguished Professor at her alma mater the University of Toronto, in the Canadian Institute for Theoretical Astrophysics (CITA), having previously spent 20 years as a professor at the Massachusetts Institute of Technology. Seager is known for her work on extrasolar planets and their atmospheres. She is the author of two textbooks on these topics, and has been recognized for her research by Popular Science, Discover Magazine, Nature, and TIME Magazine. Seager was awarded a MacArthur Fellowship in 2013 citing her theoretical work on detecting chemical signatures on exoplanet atmospheres and developing low-cost space observatories to observe planetary transits.

== Background ==
Seager was born in Toronto, Ontario, Canada, and is Jewish. Her father, David Seager, who lost his hair when he was 19 years old, was a pioneer and one of the world's leaders in hair transplantation and the founder of the Seager Hair Transplant Centre in Toronto.

She earned her BSc degree in mathematics and physics from the University of Toronto in 1994, assisted by a NSERC University Undergraduate Student Research Award, and a PhD in astronomy from Harvard University in 1999. Her doctoral thesis developed theoretical models of atmospheres on extrasolar planets and was supervised by Dimitar Sasselov.

She held a postdoctoral research fellow position at the Institute for Advanced Study between 1999 and 2002 and a senior research staff member at the Carnegie Institution of Washington until 2006. She joined the Massachusetts Institute of Technology in January 2007 as an associate professor in both physics and planetary science, was granted tenure in July 2007, and was elevated to full professor in July 2010. As of 2013 she holds the "Class of 1941" chair. In November 2025, it was announced that Seager will join the Canadian Institute for Theoretical Astrophysics as North Star Distinguished Professor starting September 1, 2026.

She was elected a Legacy Fellow of the American Astronomical Society in 2020.

== Personal life ==
She is married to Charles Darrow and they have two sons from her first marriage. Her first spouse, Michael Wevrick, died of cancer in 2011.

== Academic research ==
Seager talking about exoplanets

Seager's research has been primarily directed toward the discovery and analysis of exoplanets; in particular her work is centered around ostensibly rare earth analogs, leading NASA to dub her "an astronomical Indiana Jones." Seager used the term "gas dwarf" for a high-mass super-Earth-type planet composed mainly of hydrogen and helium in an animation of one model of the exoplanet Gliese 581c. The term "gas dwarf" has also been used to refer to planets smaller than gas giants, with thick hydrogen and helium atmospheres. Together with Marc Kuchner, Seager had predicted the existence of carbon planets.

Seager has been the chair of the NASA Science and Technology Definition team for a proposed mission, "Starshade", to launch a free-flying occulting disk, used to block the light from a distant star in order for a telescope to be able to resolve the (much dimmer) light from an accompanying exoplanet located in the habitable zone of the star.

In years since 2020, Sara has been focusing on work related to Venus, with the potential discovery of phosphine, a biosignature gas, in the upper atmosphere.

=== Seagers equation ===
Seager developed a parallel version of the Drake equation to estimate the number of habitable planets in the Galaxy. Instead of aliens with radio technology, Seager has revised the Drake equation to focus on simply the presence of any alien life detectable from Earth. The equation focuses on the search for planets with biosignature gases, gases produced by life that can accumulate in a planet atmosphere to levels that can be detected with remote space telescopes.

$$N = N^*F_\text{Q} F_\text{HZ} F_\text{O} F_\text{L} F_\text{S}$$

where:

- N = the number of planets with detectable signs of life
- N* = the number of stars observed
- F_{Q} = the fraction of stars that are quiet
- F_{HZ} = the fraction of stars with rocky planets in the habitable zone
- F_{O} = the fraction of stars with observable planets
- F_{L} = the fraction of planets that have life
- F_{S} = the fraction of life forms that produce planetary atmospheres with one or more detectable signature gases

=== Asteria spacecraft ===
Seager was the principal investigator of the Asteria (Arcsecond Space Telescope Enabling Research in Astrophysics) spacecraft, a 6-U cubesat designed to do precision photometry to search for extrasolar planets, a collaborative project between MIT and NASA's Jet Propulsion Laboratory. ASTERIA was launched into low Earth orbit from the International Space Station on November 20, 2017, and successfully operated until its orbital decay on April 24, 2020.

=== Venus missions ===
In 2020, Seager led a team proposing a mission Venus Life Finder, a small spacecraft to investigate the possibility of life in the atmosphere of Venus. The mission will be a privately funded spacecraft to be launched by Rocket Lab on the Electron rocket with a target launch date in summer 2026.

The Morning Star Missions to Venus team, including Seager, have planned a thorough list of missions with the aim of finding "signs of life or life itself" on Venus. These missions include the Venus Habitability Mission, Rocket Lab Mission to Venus, and Atmospheric Cloud Sample Return Mission. The feasibility of these missions depends on the efficiency of atmospheric data collection, through the direct in-situ examination of collected cloud liquid material, or the sample return of the material with further investigation to be performed on Earth-based laboratories. The proposed instrumentation include cost-effective probes designed to investigate the chemical signatures and will return solid, liquid, and cloud samples from the 48 km to 60 km altitude cloud-decks of Venus. The mission schedule for the Venus Habitability Mission is set with a target launch date of May 2031.

== Honors and awards ==
Seager was awarded the 2012 Sackler Prize for "analysis of the atmospheres and internal compositions of extra-solar planets," the Helen B. Warner Prize from the American Astronomical Society in 2007 for developing "fundamental techniques for understanding, analyzing, and finding the atmospheres of extrasolar planets," and the 2004 Harvard Book Prize in Astronomy. She was appointed as a fellow to the American Association for the Advancement of Science in 2012 and elected to the Royal Astronomical Society of Canada as an honorary member in 2013. In September 2013 she became a MacArthur Fellow. She was elected to the American Philosophical Society in 2018. She was the Elizabeth R. Laird Lecturer at Memorial University of Newfoundland in 2018. On August 19, 2020, Seager appeared on the Lex Fridman Podcast (#116).

In 2020, she was appointed as an Officer of the Order of Canada. She won the 2020 Los Angeles Times Prize for Science and Technology for The Smallest Lights in the Universe.

She was an honorary graduand at her alma mater, the University of Toronto Spring 2023 Convocation.

In 2024, Seager was awarded the Kavli Prize in Astrophysics.

Sara Seager received the 2025 Nomis Distinguished Scientist and Scholar Award.

The NOMIS Foundation connects the award to her project on habitability and the search for life beyond Earth.

External videos
- Sara Seager, "The search for planets beyond our solar system", TED2015
- "Space Experts Discuss the Search for Life in the Universe at NASA", NASA 2014
- "Sara Seager ", Origins 2011

== Publications ==
=== Books ===
- Deming, Drake; Seager, Sara (2003). Deming, Drake; Seager, Sara (eds.). Scientific Frontiers in Research on Extrasolar Planets. ASP Conference Proceedings (Volume 294). Vol. 294. San Francisco: Astronomical Society of the Pacific. Bibcode:2003ASPC..294.....D. ISBN 978-1-58381-141-2.
- Seager, Sara (2010). Exoplanet Atmospheres: Physical Processes. Princeton University Press. ISBN 978-1-4008-3530-0.
- Seager, Sara (2010). Exoplanets. University of Arizona Press. ISBN 978-0-8165-2945-2.
- Seager, Sara (2020). The Smallest Lights in the Universe: A Memoir. Crown. ISBN 978-0-5255-7625-9.

=== Journal articles ===
- Seager, S.; Sasselov, D. D. (2000). "Theoretical Transmission Spectra during Extrasolar Giant Planet Transits". The Astrophysical Journal. 537 (2): 916–921. arXiv:astro-ph/9912241. Bibcode:2000ApJ...537..916S. doi:10.1086/309088. ISSN 0004-637X. S2CID 15900986.
- Seager, S.; Mallen-Ornelas, G. (2003). "A Unique Solution of Planet and Star Parameters from an Extrasolar Planet Transit Light Curve". The Astrophysical Journal. 585 (2): 1038–1055. arXiv:astro-ph/0206228. Bibcode:2003ApJ...585.1038S. doi:10.1086/346105. ISSN 0004-637X. S2CID 14274640.
- Benjamin, Robert A.; Churchwell, E.; Babler, Brian L.; Bania, T. M.; Clemens, Dan P.; Cohen, Martin; Dickey, John M.; Indebetouw, Rémy; Jackson, James M.; Kobulnicky, Henry A.; Lazarian, Alex; Marston, A. P.; Mathis, John S.; Meade, Marilyn R.; Seager, Sara; Stolovy, S. R.; Watson, C.; Whitney, Barbara A.; Wolff, Michael J.; Wolfire, Mark G. (2003). "GLIMPSE. I. AnSIRTFLegacy Project to Map the Inner Galaxy". Publications of the Astronomical Society of the Pacific. 115 (810): 953–964. arXiv:astro-ph/0306274. Bibcode:2003PASP..115..953B. doi:10.1086/376696. ISSN 0004-6280. S2CID 119510724.
- Deming, Drake; Seager, Sara; Richardson, L. Jeremy; Harrington, Joseph (2005). "Infrared radiation from an extrasolar planet". Nature. 434 (7034): 740–743. arXiv:astro-ph/0503554. Bibcode:2005Natur.434..740D. doi:10.1038/nature03507. ISSN 0028-0836. PMID 15785769. S2CID 4404769.
- Borucki, WJ; et al. (2010). "Kepler Planet-Detection Mission: Introduction and First Results" (PDF). Science. 327 (5968): 977–980. Bibcode:2010Sci...327..977B. doi:10.1126/science.1185402. ISSN 0036-8075. PMID 20056856. S2CID 22858074.
- Borucki, William J.; Koch, David G.; Basri, Gibor; Batalha, Natalie; Brown, Timothy M.; Bryson, Stephen T.; Caldwell, Douglas; Christensen-Dalsgaard, Jørgen; Cochran, William D.; Devore, Edna; Dunham, Edward W.; Gautier, Thomas N.; Geary, John C.; Gilliland, Ronald; Gould, Alan; Howell, Steve B.; Jenkins, Jon M.; Latham, David W.; Lissauer, Jack J.; Marcy, Geoffrey W.; Rowe, Jason; Sasselov, Dimitar; Boss, Alan; Charbonneau, David; Ciardi, David; Doyle, Laurance; Dupree, Andrea K.; Ford, Eric B.; Fortney, Jonathan; et al. (2011). "Characteristics of Planetary Candidates Observed by Kepler, II: Analysis of the First Four Months of Data". The Astrophysical Journal. 736 (1): 19. arXiv:1102.0541. Bibcode:2011ApJ...736...19B. doi:10.1088/0004-637X/736/1/19. ISSN 0004-637X. S2CID 15233153.

== See also ==
- List of women in leadership positions on astronomical instrumentation projects
