= OGLE-TR-56 =

Star in the constellation Sagittarius

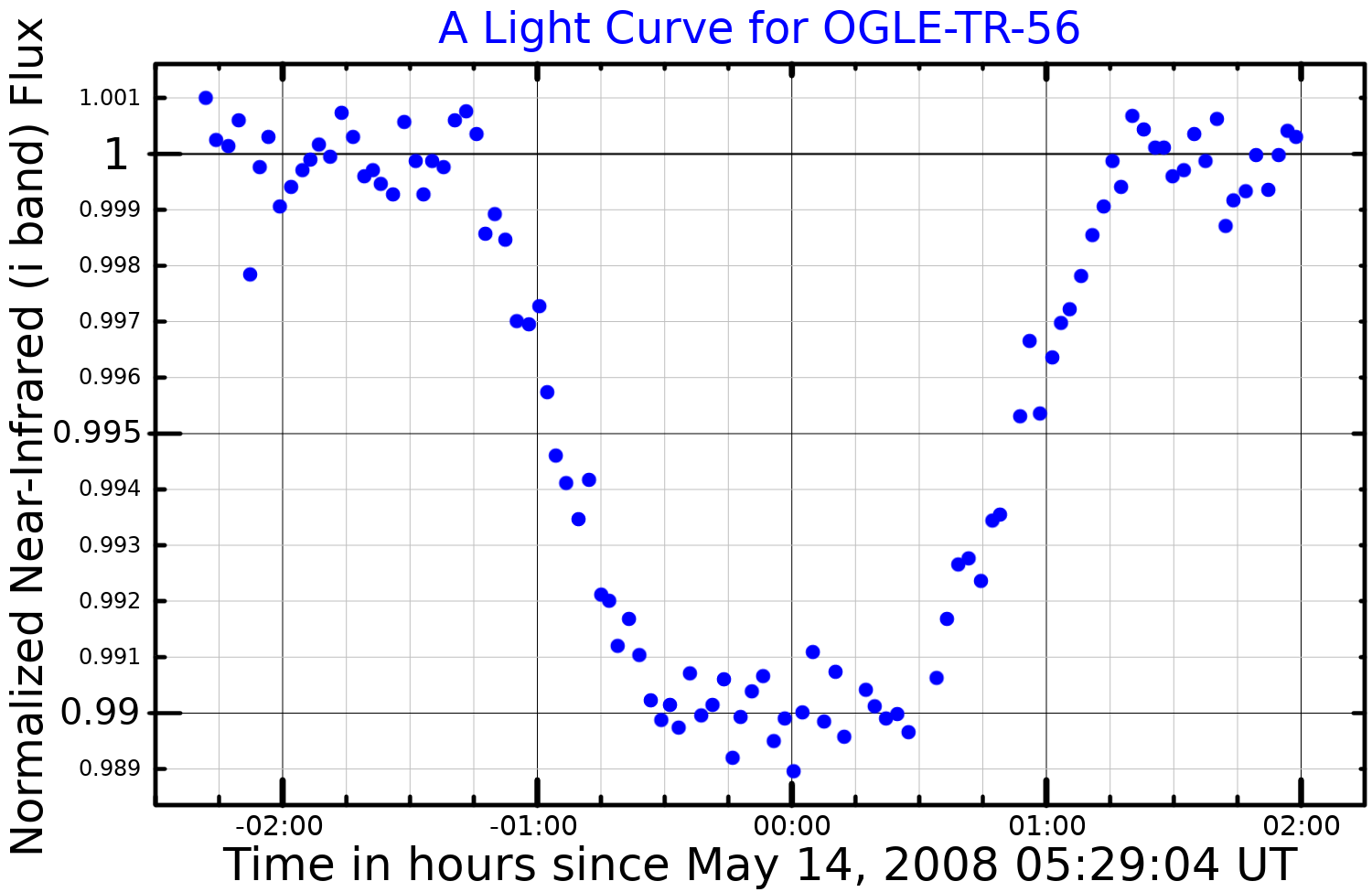
- A light curve showing the May 14, 2008 planet transit across OGLE-TR-56. Adapted from Adams et al. (2011)

Observation data Epoch J2000.0 Equinox ICRS
- Constellation: Sagittarius
- Right ascension: 17^{h} 56^{m} 35.51^{s}
- Declination: −29° 32′ 21.2″
- Apparent magnitude (V): 16.560

Characteristics
- Spectral type: G
- Variable type: EP

Astrometry
Distance	~5,000 ly (~1,500 pc)

Details
Mass	1.17±0.04 M_{☉}
Radius	1.32±0.06 R_{☉}

Other designations
- V5157 Sagittarii, SBC9 2452

Database references
SIMBAD	data

OGLE-TR-56 is a dim, distant, magnitude 17 Sun-like star located approximately 1,500 parsecs (4,900 light-years) away in the constellation of Sagittarius. This star is listed as an eclipsing type variable star with the eclipse due to the passage of the planet as noted in the discovery papers. The eclipses were detected by the Optical Gravitational Lensing Experiment (OGLE) team analysing data collected in 2001.

== Planetary system ==
In 2002, a possible planet was discovered transiting the star, and after additional observations to rule out false positives, it was confirmed. At the time of discovery it was the shortest-period planet.

The OGLE-TR-56 planetary system
Companion (in order from star)	Mass	Semimajor axis (AU)	Orbital period (days)	Eccentricity	Inclination (°)	Radius
b	1.29±0.12 M_{J}	0.0225±0.0004	1.211909±0.000001	0	—	1.30±0.05 R_{J}

== See also ==
- Lists of exoplanets
