= New Worlds Mission =

Proposed occulter

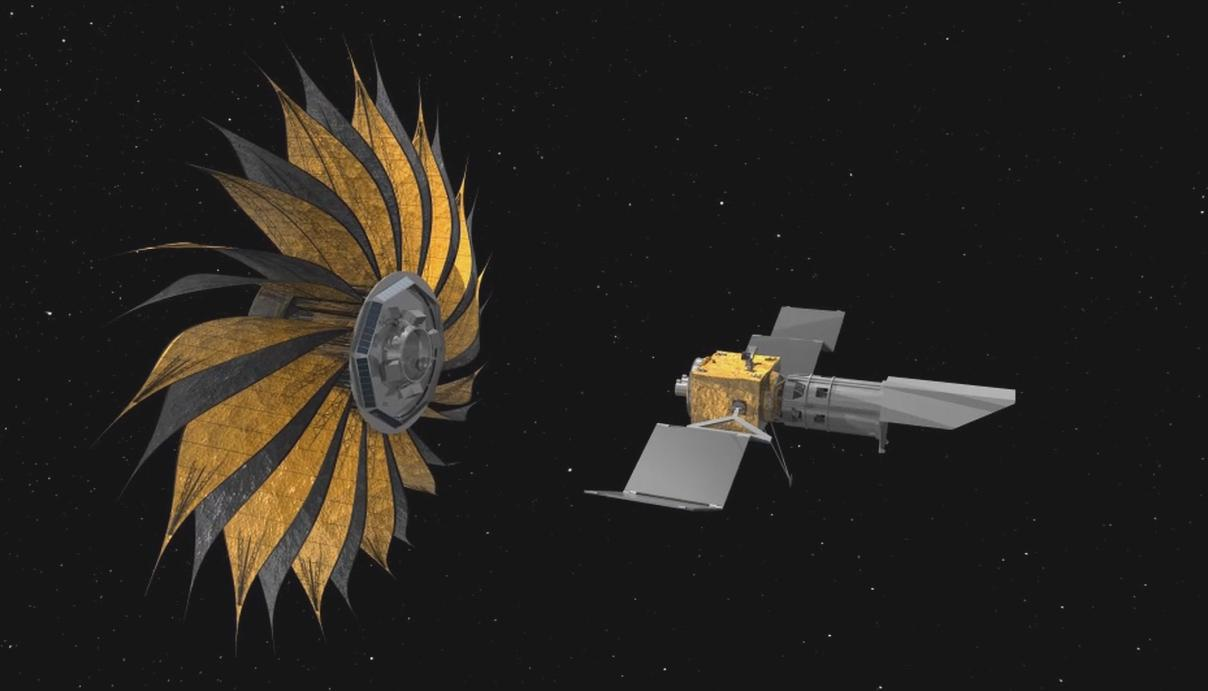
Starshade with space observatory during deployment

Video demonstration of the starshade

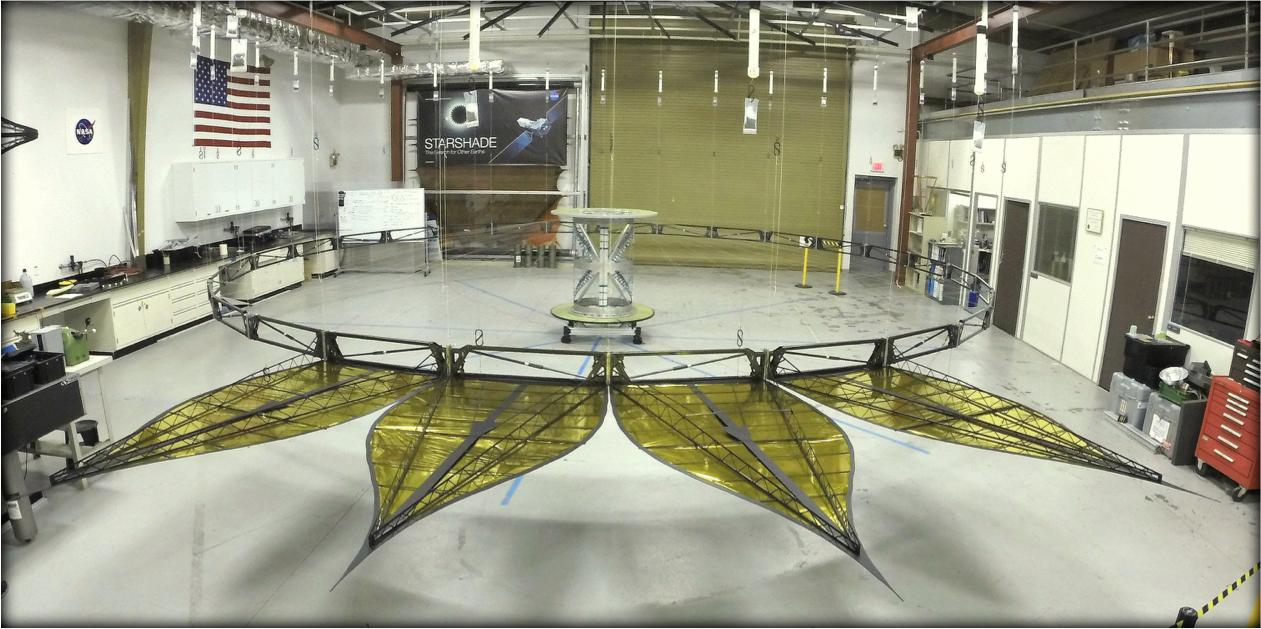
Starshade occulter test, 2014

The New Worlds Mission is a proposed project comprising a large occulter flying in formation with a space telescope designed to block the light of nearby stars in order to observe their orbiting exoplanets. The observations could be taken with an existing space telescope or a dedicated visible light optical telescope optimally designed for the task of finding exoplanets. A preliminary research project was funded from 2005 through 2008 by NASA Institute for Advanced Concepts (NIAC) and headed by Webster Cash of the University of Colorado at Boulder in conjunction with Ball Aerospace & Technologies Corp., Northrop Grumman, Southwest Research Institute and others. Since 2010 the project has been looking for additional financing from NASA and other sources in the amount of roughly US$3 billion including its own four-meter telescope. If financed and launched, it would operate for five years.

== Purpose ==
Currently, the direct detection of extrasolar planets (or exoplanets) is extremely difficult. This is primarily due to:

- Exoplanets appearing extremely close to their host stars when observed at astronomical distances. Even the closest of stars are several light years away. This means that while looking for exoplanets, one would typically be observing very small angles from the star, on the order of several tens of milli-arcseconds. Angles this small are impossible to resolve from the ground due to astronomical seeing.
- Exoplanets being extremely dim compared to their host stars. Typically, the star will be approximately a billion times brighter than the orbiting planet. This makes it nearly impossible to see planets against the star's glare.

The difficulty of observing such a dim planet so close to a bright star is the obstacle that has prevented astronomers from directly photographing exoplanets. To date, only a handful of exoplanets have been photographed. The first exoplanet to be photographed, 2M1207b, is in orbit around a star called 2M1207. Astronomers were only able to photograph this planet because it is a very unusual planet that is very far from its host star, approximately 55 astronomical units (about twice the distance of Neptune). Furthermore, the planet is orbiting a very dim star, known as a brown dwarf.

To overcome the difficulty of distinguishing more Earth-like planets in the vicinity of a bright star, the New Worlds Mission would block the star's light with an occulter. The occulter would block all of the starlight from reaching the observer, while allowing the planet's light to pass undisturbed. The starshade would be tens of meters across and probably made out of Kapton, a lightweight material similar to Mylar.

== Methods ==
Traditional methods of exoplanet detection rely on indirect means of inferring the existence of orbiting bodies. These methods include:

- Astrometry – watching a star move slightly due to the gravitational influence of a nearby planet
- Observing Doppler shifts of the star's spectrum due to the star's movement
- Observing the amount of light from a star change as an extrasolar planet transits the star, preventing a portion of the light from reaching the observer
- Pulsar timing
- Gravitational microlensing
- Observing radiation from circumstellar disks in the infrared

All of these methods provide convincing evidence for the existence of extrasolar planets, but none of them provide actual images of the planets.

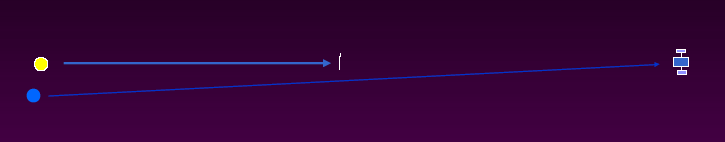
The yellow circle represents the star, whose light is blocked by the occulter. The blue circle represents the planet, whose light passes to the observer undisturbed.

The goal of the New Worlds Mission is to block the light coming from nearby stars with an occulter. This would allow the direct observation of orbiting planets. The occulter would be a large sheet disc flown thousands of kilometers along the line of sight. The disc would likely be several tens of meters in diameter and would fit inside existing expendable launch vehicles and be deployed after launch.

One difficulty with this concept is that light incoming from the target star would diffract around the disc and constructively interfere along the central axis. Thus the starlight would still be easily visible, making planet detection impossible. This concept was first famously theorized by Siméon Poisson in order to disprove the wave theory of light, as he thought the existence of a bright spot at the center of the shadow to be nonsensical. However Dominique Arago experimentally verified the existence of the spot of Arago. This effect can be negated by specifically shaping the occulter. By adding specially shaped petals to the outer edge of the disc, the spot of Arago will disappear, allowing the suppression of the star's light.

This technique would make planetary detection possible for stars within approximately 10 parsecs (about 32 light years) of Earth. It is estimated that there could be several thousand exoplanets within that distance. The starshade is similar to but should not be confused with the Aragoscope, which is a proposed imaging device designed to use the diffraction of light around a perfectly-circular light-shield to produce an image. The starshade is a proposed sunflower-shaped coronagraph disc that was designed to block starlight that interferes with telescopic observations of other worlds. The "petals" of the "sunflower" shape of the starshade are designed to eliminate the diffraction that is the central feature of an Aragoscope.

The starshade is a spacecraft designed by Webster Cash, an astrophysicist at the University of Colorado at Boulder's Center for Astrophysics and Space Astronomy. The proposed spacecraft was designed to work in tandem with space telescopes like the James Webb Space Telescope, which did not use it, or a new 4-meter telescope. It would fly 72,000 km (45,000 mi) in front of a space telescope (between the telescope and a target star) and approximately 238,600 miles (384,000 km) away from Earth, outside of Earth's heliocentric orbit. When unfurled, the starshade resembles a sunflower, with pointed protrusions around its circumference. The starshade acts as a very large coronagraph: it blocks light of a distant star, making it easier to observe associated planets. The unfurled starshade could reduce collected light from bright stars by as much as 10 billion-fold. Light that "leaks" around the edges would be used by the telescope as it scans the target system for planets. With the reduction of the harsh light, astronomers will be able to check exoplanet atmospheres tens of trillions of miles away for the potential chemical signatures of life.

== Objectives ==
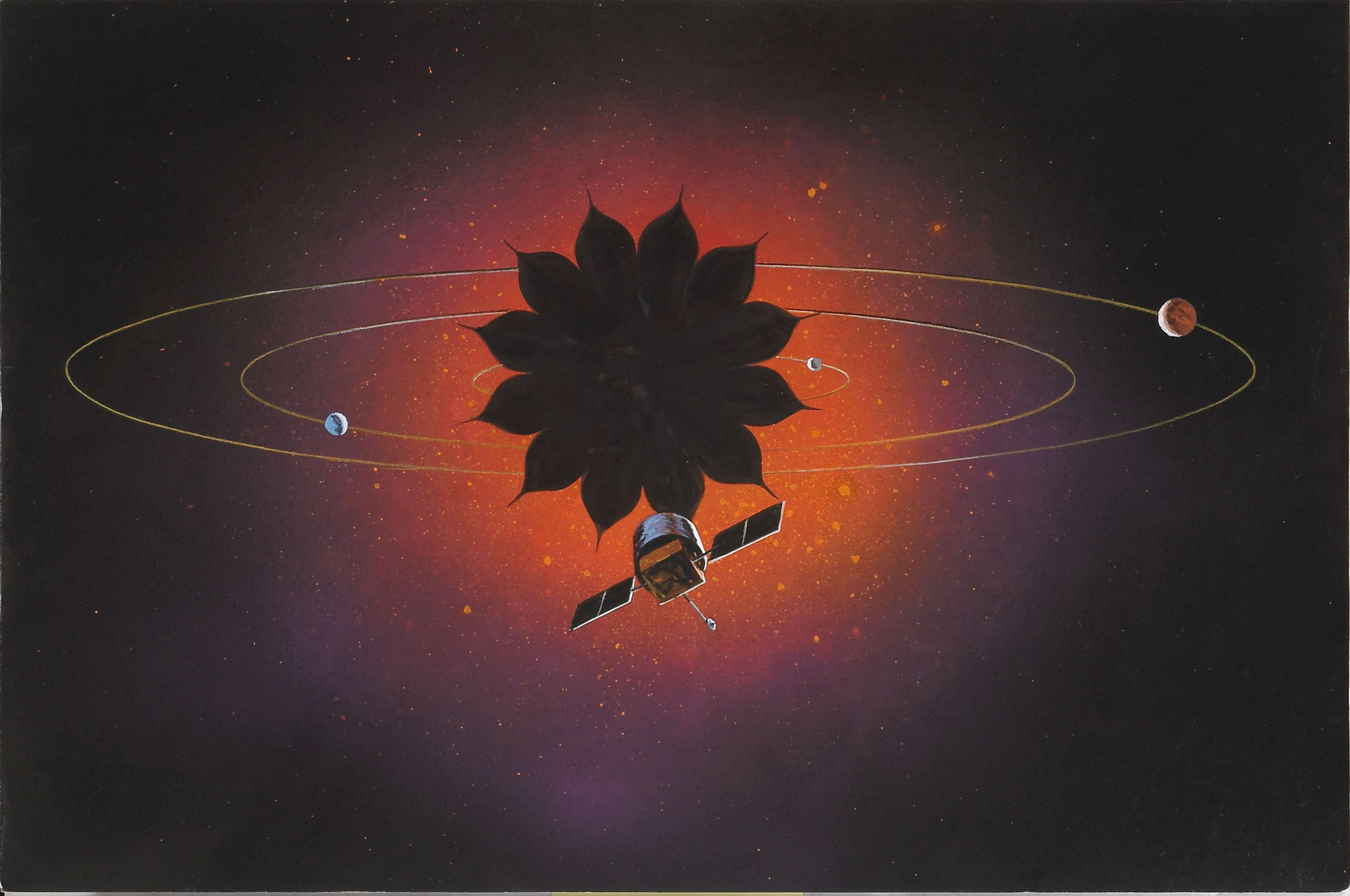
Artistic vision showing the outline of the occulter ahead of a space telescope, with orbiting exoplanets stylistically added (not to scale)

The New Worlds Mission aims to discover and analyze terrestrial extrasolar planets:

1. Detection: First, using the space telescope and 'starshade', or occulter, exoplanetary systems will be directly detected.
2. System mapping: Following detection, system mapping would involve the direct mapping of planetary systems through the detection of the planetary light separate from the parent star. In a sufficiently high-quality image, planets would appear as individual star-like objects. A series of images of the planetary system would allow measurements of planetary orbits, and the brightness and broadband colors of the planets would provide information about their basic nature.
3. Planet studies: At this stage, detailed study of individual planets would take place. With a low noise level and a modest signal, spectroscopy and photometry can be performed. Spectroscopy allows scientists to perform chemical analysis of atmospheres and surfaces, which might hold clues to the existence of life elsewhere in the universe. Photometry will show variation in color and intensity as surface features rotate in and out of the field of view, allowing for the detection of oceans, continents, polar caps and clouds.
4. Planet imaging: A large increase in capability is needed to achieve true planet imaging. However, techniques of interferometry show that, in principle, this is possible to achieve. Fifty to one hundred percent of a planet's surface could theoretically be mapped, depending on the planet's inclination.
5. Planetary assessment: The final step in extrasolar planet studies would be the ability to study these distant worlds in the same way that Earth-observing systems study the Earth's surface. Such a telescope would need to be extremely large, to collect enough light to resolve and analyze small details on the planet's surface. However, these kinds of studies do not lie in the foreseeable future, for it takes square kilometers of collecting area to capture the needed signal.

In addition to finding and analyzing terrestrial planets, it can also discover and analyze gas giants. The New Worlds Mission will also find moons and rings orbiting extrasolar planets. This technique will involve direct imaging of planets by blocking the starlight with a starshade. It will study the moons and rings in detail and find whether moons can also support life if gas giant planets orbit in the habitable zones of parent stars.

== Architecture ==
There are many possibilities for various New Worlds Missions, including

- New Worlds Discoverer proposed to use an existing space telescope (like the James Webb Space Telescope), to find exoplanets. The size of the starshade could be optimized for the observing telescope.
- New Worlds Observer would use two spacecraft, one that has a dedicated telescope and one with a starshade to find exoplanets. The possibility of two starshades is also a consideration. One starshade to point towards the desired target while the other moves into position for the next target. This would eliminate some of the time delay in observing different systems and allow for many more targets to be observed in the same timespan.
- New Worlds Imager would use many spacecraft/starshades. This would allow observers to resolve the planet and obtain true planetary imaging.

== See also ==
- Aragoscope
- Coronagraph, a telescopic attachment to block out the light from a star so that nearby objects can be resolved
- Space sunshade
- HabEx
- Habitable Worlds Observatory
