= OGLE-TR-56b =

Hot Jupiter orbiting OGLE-TR-56

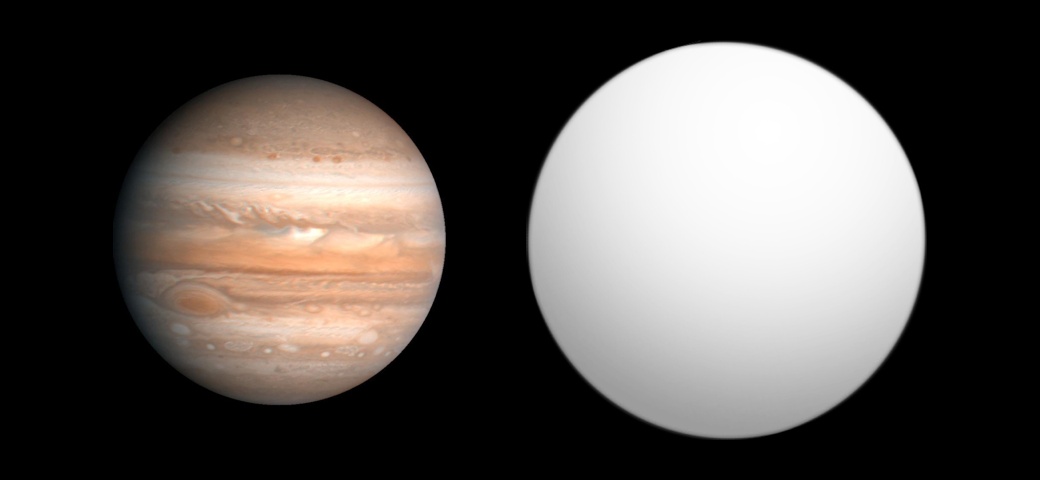
- Size comparison of OGLE-TR-56b with Jupiter.

Discovery
- Discovered by: Dimitar D. Sasselov et al.
- Discovery date: 3 November 2002 confirmed: 4 January 2003
- Detection method: Transit

Orbital characteristics
- Apastron: 0.0225 AU (3,370,000 km)
- Periastron: 0.0225 AU (3,370,000 km)
- Semi-major axis: 0.0225 ± 0.0004 AU (3,366,000 ± 60,000 km)
- Eccentricity: 0
- Orbital period (sidereal): 1.211909 ± 0.000001 d 29.08582 h
- Average orbital speed: 203
- Inclination: 78.8 ± 0.5
- Star: OGLE-TR-56

Physical characteristics
- Mean radius: 1.20±0.17 R_{J}
- Mass: 1.30±0.08 M_{J}
- Mean density: 0.75±0.34 ρ_{J}
- Surface gravity: 22.3 ± 6.7 m/s^{2} (73 ± 22 ft/s^{2})
- Temperature: 2140±120 K

OGLE-TR-56b is an extrasolar planet located approximately 1500 parsecs or 5000 light years away in the constellation of Sagittarius, orbiting the star OGLE-TR-56. This planet was the first known exoplanet to be discovered with the transit method. The object was discovered by the OGLE project, announced on July 5, 2002 and confirmed on January 4, 2003 by the Doppler technique. The period of this confirmed planet was the shortest until the confirmed discovery of WASP-12b on April 1, 2008. The short period and proximity of the OGLE-TR-56 b to its host mean it belongs to a class of objects known as hot Jupiters.

The radial velocity trend of OGLE-TR-56, caused by the presence of OGLE-TR-56 b.

The planet is thought to be only 4 stellar radii from its star, and hot enough to have iron rain.

== See also ==
- Optical Gravitational Lensing Experiment (OGLE)
- OGLE-TR-113b
- OGLE-TR-10b
- OGLE-TR-111b
- OGLE2-TR-L9b
