= OGLE-TR-113 =

Star in the constellation Carina

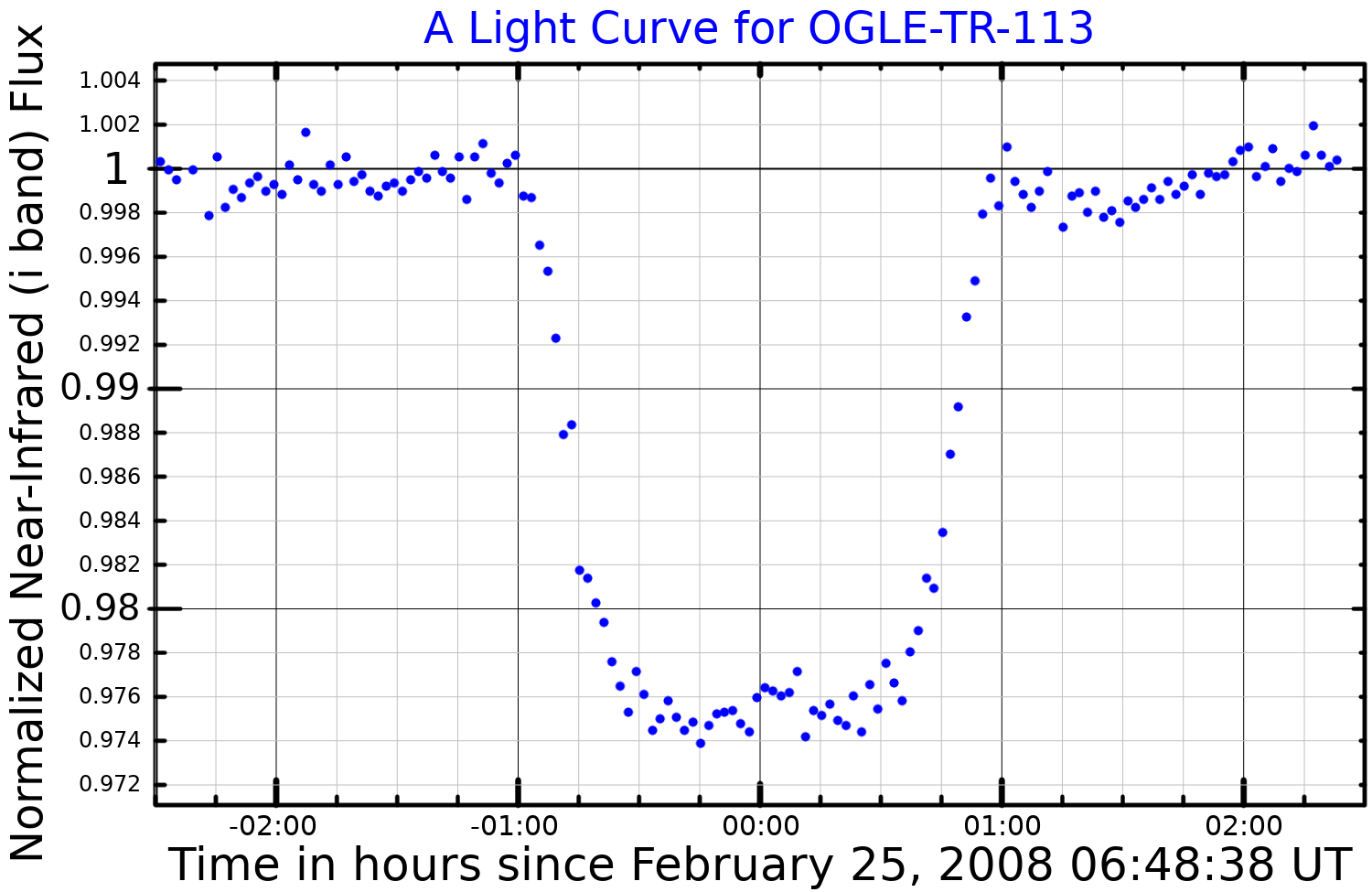
- A light curve showing the February 25, 2008 planet transit across OGLE-TR-113. Adapted from Adams et al. (2010)

Observation data Epoch J2000.0 Equinox ICRS
- Constellation: Carina
- Right ascension: 10^{h} 52^{m} 24.28^{s}
- Declination: −61° 26′ 48.8″
- Apparent magnitude (V): 16.08

Characteristics
- Spectral type: K
- Apparent magnitude (I): ~14.42
- Apparent magnitude (K): 13.0±0.1
- Variable type: EP

Astrometry
Proper motion (μ)	RA: −15.049 mas/yr Dec.: +9.684 mas/yr
Parallax (π)	1.6898±0.0257 mas
Distance	1,930 ± 30 ly (592 ± 9 pc)
Absolute magnitude (M_{V})	15.55

Details
Mass	0.78±0.02 M_{☉}
Radius	0.77±0.02 R_{☉}
Metallicity	0.15±0.10
Age	> 0.7 billion years

Other designations
- V752 Carinae, SBC9 2451

Database references
SIMBAD	data

OGLE-TR-113 is a dim, distant magnitude 16 binary star in the star fields of the constellation Carina. Because of its distance of about 1,930 light years, and location in a crowded field it was not notable in any way. Its apparent brightness changes when one of its planets transits, so the star has been given the variable star designation V752 Carinae. Spectral type of the star is type K dwarf star, slightly cooler and less luminous than the Sun.

== Planetary system ==
However, in 2002 the Optical Gravitational Lensing Experiment (OGLE) detected periodic dimming in the star's light curve indicating a transiting, planetary-sized object. Since low-mass red dwarfs and brown dwarfs may mimic a planet radial velocity measurements were necessary to calculate the mass of the body. In 2004 the object was proved to be a new transiting extrasolar planet, OGLE-TR-113b.

The OGLE-TR-113 planetary system
Companion (in order from star)	Mass	Semimajor axis (AU)	Orbital period (days)	Eccentricity	Inclination (°)	Radius
b	1.32±0.19 M_{J}	0.0229±0.0002	1.4324757±0.0000013	0	—	—

== See also ==
- OGLE-TR-132
- Optical Gravitational Lensing Experiment
- List of extrasolar planets
