= Aragoscope =

Proposed occulter

An Aragoscope is a telescope design based on diffraction around the edge of an occluding disc, named after French scientist François Arago.

== Concept ==
The light diffracted around the edge of a perfectly circular occluder interferes constructively at the central axis, producing a bright spot known as the Arago spot. The resolution at that point would be equal to the resolution of a conventional lens with the same size as the occluder, although the light would be much less intense. On this basis it would be possible to create a telescope by placing a suitable disc in space accompanied by a separate telescope some distance away along its axis. This concept has been explored by NASA and received Phase One funding in June 2014 by the NASA Innovative Advanced Concepts (NIAC) program.

This is a very different approach from that taken by another NASA project, the New Worlds Mission, which aims to use an occluder with "petals", otherwise known as a starshade, specifically designed to avoid diffraction onto the central axis.

== See also ==
- Arago telescope, a 38 cm (15 inch) refractor at Paris Observatory's east tower
- Zone plate
