= OGLE-TR-113b =

Extrasolar planet orbiting the star OGLE-TR-113

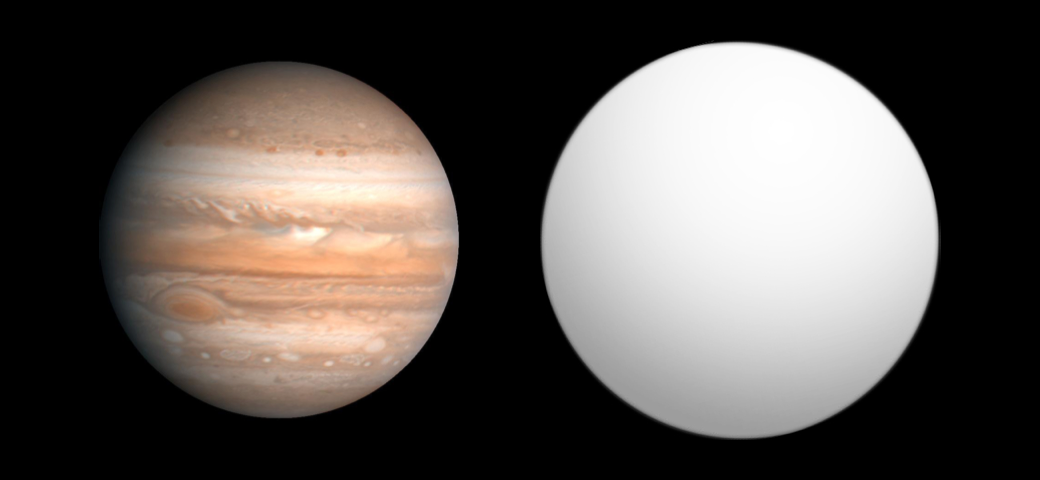
- Size comparison of OGLE-TR-113b with Jupiter

Discovery
- Discovered by: Konacki et al.
- Discovery site: Poland
- Discovery date: transit found in 2002, proved to be a planet on 14 April 2004
- Detection method: Transit

Orbital characteristics
- Semi-major axis: 0.0229 ± 0.0002 AU (3,426,000 ± 30,000 km)
- Eccentricity: 0
- Orbital period (sidereal): 1.4324757 ± 0.0000013 d
- Inclination: 88.8
- Star: OGLE-TR-113

Physical characteristics
- Mean radius: 1.09 ±0.03 R_{J}
- Mass: 1.32 ±0.19 M_{J}

OGLE-TR-113b is an extrasolar planet orbiting the star OGLE-TR-113.

In 2002 the Optical Gravitational Lensing Experiment (OGLE) detected periodic dimming in the star's light curve indicating a transiting, planetary-sized object. Since low-mass red dwarfs and brown dwarfs may mimic a planet, radial velocity measurements were necessary to calculate the mass of the body. In 2004, the object was proved to be a new transiting extrasolar planet.

The planet has a mass 1.32 times that of Jupiter. Since the planet's inclination is known, the value is exact. It orbits the star (OGLE-TR-113) in an extremely close orbit, even closer than the famous planets 51 Pegasi b and HD 209458 b. The planet races around the star every 1.43 days. The radius of the planet is only 9% larger than Jupiter's, despite the heating effect by the star. Planets of its kind are sometimes called "super-hot Jupiters".

== See also ==
- OGLE-TR-132b
- List of extrasolar planets
- OGLE-TR-10b
- OGLE-TR-111b
- OGLE-TR-56b
- OGLE2-TR-L9b
