= Telescope for Habitable Exoplanets and Interstellar/Intergalactic Astronomy =

Proposed space telescope

Telescope for Habitable Exoplanets and Interstellar/Intergalactic Astronomy (THEIA) is a NASA-proposed 4-metre optical/ultraviolet space telescope that would succeed the Hubble Space Telescope and complement the infrared-James Webb Space Telescope. THEIA would use a 40-metre occulter to block starlight so as to directly image exoplanets.

It was proposed with three main instruments and an occulter:

- eXoPlanet Characterizer (XPC)
- Star Formation Camera (SFC),
- Ultraviolet Spectrograph (UVS)
- A separate occulter spacecraft

== See also ==
- List of proposed space observatories
