= Dimitar Sasselov =

Bulgarian astronomer

Dimitar D. Sasselov (Bulgarian: Димитър Д. Съселов; born 1961) is a Bulgarian astronomer based in the United States. He is a Professor of Astronomy at Harvard University and director of the Harvard Origins of Life Initiative. In 2002, Sasselov led a team that discovered the most distant planet in the Milky Way known at the time.

Sasselov was born in Bulgaria to a scientific family. His father was an architect and his Greek mother was a horticulturist. He developed a liking for astronomy at an early age and would observe the moons of Jupiter by means of a small telescope. Sasselov finished a primary school in Nesebar and a high school in Burgas.

In the 1980s, Sasselov continued his study of astronomy at the Sofia University's Faculty of Physics. After he published a paper in international scientific journals, he was invited by the University of Toronto, who offered him a scholarship. However, Sasselov was not granted an exit visa by the Bulgarian authorities. He acquired a doctorate in physics from Sofia University in 1988; shortly thereafter, with the collapse of the Soviet Union and the communist regimes in Eastern Europe, Sasselov had the chance to eventually continue his work at the University of Toronto. In 1990, he earned his doctorate in astronomy there.

In 1991, Sasselov joined the Center for Astrophysics | Harvard & Smithsonian. He has been a Harvard professor since 1998. In 2002, Sasselov and his team sighted OGLE-TR-56b, a planet in the constellation Sagittarius that was the farthest planet from the Earth discovered until then. In his search for planets, he employs novel methods that can potentially detect planets similar to Earth, and he co-operates with NASA's Kepler Mission. Sasselov's other research focuses on the interaction between radiation and matter.
