= Space sunshade =

Earth shield to reduce sunlight

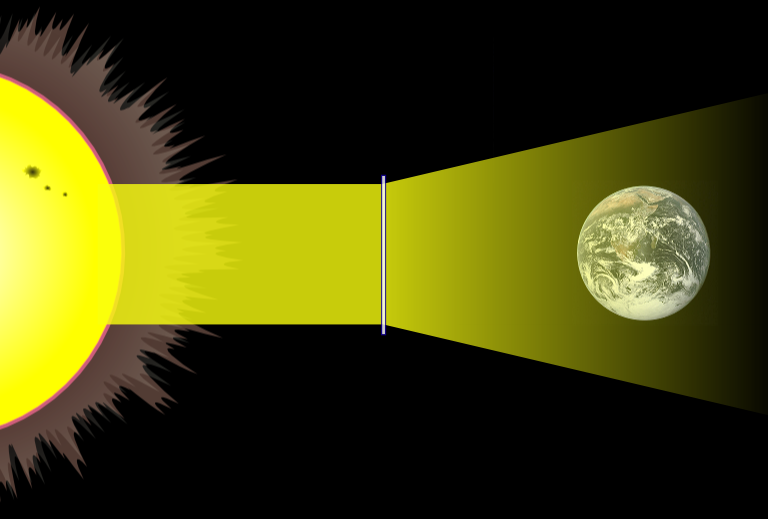
The basic function of a space lens to mitigate global warming. A 1,000-kilometre diameter lens is sufficient, and much smaller than what is shown in this simplified image. As a Fresnel lens it would be only a few millimeters thick.

A space sunshade or sunshield is something that diverts or otherwise reduces some of the Sun's radiation, preventing it from hitting the Earth and thereby reducing its insolation, which results in reduced heating. Light can be diverted by different methods. First proposed in 1989, another space sunshade concept involves putting a large occulting disc, or technology of equivalent purpose, between the Earth and Sun.

A sunshade could potentially be one climate engineering method for mitigating global warming through solar radiation management, because internationally negotiated reductions in carbon emissions may be insufficient to stem climate change. Sunshades could also be used to produce space solar power, acting as solar power satellites. Proposed shade designs include a single-piece shade and a shade made by a great number of small objects. Most such proposals contemplate a blocking element at the Sun-Earth L1 Lagrangian point.

Modern proposals are based on some form of distributed sunshade composed of lightweight transparent elements or inflatable "space bubbles" manufactured in space to reduce the cost of launching massive objects to space. However it would cost trillions of dollars and no prototype has yet been launched. Critics also argue that building it would be too slow to prevent dangerous levels of global warming.

== Proposed designs ==
=== Cloud of small spacecraft ===
One proposed sunshade would be composed of 16 trillion small disks at the Sun-Earth L1 Lagrangian point, 1.5 million kilometers from Earth and between it and the Sun. Each disk is proposed to have a 0.6-meter diameter and a thickness of about 5 micrometers. The mass of each disk would be about a gram, adding up to a total of almost 20 million tonnes. Such a group of small sunshades that blocks 2% of the sunlight, deflecting it off into space, would be enough to halt global warming. If 100 tonnes of disks were launched to low Earth orbit every day, it would take 550 years to launch all of them.

The individual autonomous flyers building up the cloud of sunshades are proposed not to reflect the sunlight but rather to be transparent lenses, deflecting the light slightly so it does not hit Earth. This minimizes the effect of solar radiation pressure on the units, requiring less effort to hold them in place at the L1 point. An optical prototype has been constructed by Roger Angel with funding from NIAC.

The remaining solar pressure and the fact that the L1 point is one of unstable equilibrium, easily disturbed by the wobble of the Earth due to gravitational effects from the Moon, requires the small autonomous flyers to be capable of maneuvering themselves to hold position. A suggested solution is to place mirrors capable of rotation on the surface of the flyers. By using the solar radiation pressure on the mirrors as solar sails and tilting them in the right direction, the flyer will be capable of altering its speed and direction to keep in position.

Such a group of sunshades would need to occupy an area of about 3.8 million square kilometers if placed at the L1 point (see other lower disc size estimates below).

It would still take years to launch enough of the disks into orbit to have any effect. This means a long lead time. Roger Angel of the University of Arizona presented the idea for a sunshade at the U.S. National Academy of Sciences in April 2006 and won a NASA Institute for Advanced Concepts grant for further research in July 2006. Creating this sunshade in space was estimated to cost in excess of US$130 billion over 20 years with an estimated lifetime of 50-100 years. Thus leading Professor Angel to conclude that "the sunshade is no substitute for developing renewable energy, the only permanent solution. A similar massive level of technological innovation and financial investment could ensure that. But if the planet gets into an abrupt climate crisis that can only be fixed by cooling, it would be good to be ready with some shading solutions that have been worked out."

Researchers from the University of Stuttgart, Institute of Space Systems described a roadmap for the development, construction and transport of an international planetary sun shield (IPSS) at the Lagrange point 1 in 2021, which would also be a photovoltaic plant. Here, too, as with Hermann Oberth, production on the Moon, the use of an electromagnetic Moon slingshot (lunar coilgun) and the transport of the components from the Moon to the Lagrange point 1 between the Earth and the Sun are discussed by means of electric spaceships (alternatively with sun sails) assumed. The authors refer to the many international activities and the chance to put the sunlight shield into operation by 2060.

==== Lightweight solutions and "Space bubbles" ====
A more recent design has been proposed by Olivia Borgue and Andreas M. Hein in 2022, proposing a distributed sunshade with a mass on the order of 100,000 tons, composed of ultra-thin polymeric films and SiO2 nanotubes. The author estimated that launching such mass would require 399 yearly launches of a vehicle such as SpaceX Starship for 10 years.

A 2022 concept by MIT Senseable City Lab proposes using thin-film structures ("space bubbles") manufactured in outer space to solve the problem of launching the required mass to space. MIT scientists led by Carlo Ratti believe deflecting 1.8 percent of solar radiation can fully reverse climate change. The full raft of inflatable bubbles would be roughly the size of Brazil and include a control system to regulate its distance from the Sun and optimise its effects. The shell of the thin-film bubbles would be made of silicon, tested in outer space-like conditions at a pressure of .0028 atm and at -50 degrees Celsius. They plan to investigate low vapor-pressure materials to rapidly inflate the bubbles, such as a silicon-based melt or a graphene-reinforced ionic liquid.

In July 2022, researchers from the University of Luxembourg, Olivia Borgue and Andreas M. Hein, have instead proposed integrating nanotubes made out of silicon dioxide into ultra-thin polymeric films (described as "space bubbles" in the media), whose semi-transparent nature would allow them to resist the pressure of solar wind at L1 point better than any alternative with the same weight. The use of these "bubbles" would limit the mass of a distributed sunshade roughly the size of Brazil to about 100,000 tons, much lower than the earlier proposals. However, it would still require between 399 and 899 yearly launches of a vehicle such as SpaceX Starship for a period of around 10 years, even though the production of the bubbles themselves would have to be done in space. The flights would not begin until research into production and maintenance of these bubbles is completed, which the authors estimate would require a minimum of 10–15 years. After that, the space shield may be large enough by 2050 to prevent crossing of the 2 °C (3.6 °F) threshold.

In 2023, three astronomers revisited the space dust concept, instead advocating for a lunar colony which would continuously mine the Moon in order to eject lunar dust into space on a trajectory where it would interfere with sunlight streaming towards the Earth. Ejections would have to be near-continuous, as since the dust would scatter in a matter of days, and about 10 million tons would have to be dug out and launched annually. The authors admit that they lack a background in either climate or rocket science, and the proposal may not be logistically feasible.

=== One Fresnel lens ===
Several authors have proposed dispersing light before it reaches the Earth by putting a very large lens in space, perhaps at the L1 point between the Earth and the Sun. This plan was proposed in 1989 by J. T. Early. His design involved making a large glass (2,000 km) occulter from lunar material and placing at the L1 point. Issues included the large amount of material needed to make the disc and also the energy to launch it to its orbit.

In 2004, physicist and science fiction author Gregory Benford calculated that a concave rotating Fresnel lens 1000 kilometres across, yet only a few millimeters thick, floating in space at the L_{1} point, would reduce the solar energy reaching the Earth by approximately 0.5% to 1%.

The cost of such a lens has been disputed. At a science fiction convention in 2004, Benford estimated that it would cost about US$10 billion up front, and another $10 billion in supportive cost during its lifespan.

=== One diffraction grating ===
A similar approach involves placing a very large diffraction grating (thin wire mesh) in space, perhaps at the L1 point between the Earth and the Sun. A proposal for a 3,000 ton diffraction mesh was made in 1997 by Edward Teller, Lowell Wood, and Roderick Hyde, although in 2002 these same authors argued for blocking solar radiation in the stratosphere rather than in orbit given then-current space launch technologies.

Other Lower Disc Size Estimates

Recent work by Feinberg (2022) illustrate that lower disc area sizes (factor of approximately 3.5 reduction) are feasible when the background climate response is considered. For example, the background Earth climate would yield less re-radiation and feedback. In addition, disc area sizes can be further reduced by 50 times using an Annual Solar Geoengineering approach as indicated by Feinberg (2024).

Using Plasma In space for Solar Radiation Modification

Use of plasma as a low-mass alternative to physical space-based solar shields. Such studies argue that plasma generated and maintained by electromagnetic systems could potentially reduce the material requirements associated with large solid sunshades while allowing electronic control of the shielding effect. These proposals remain theoretical and have not yet been demonstrated at climate-engineering scale. Independent studies of space-based solar shielding continue to investigate the feasibility, mass requirements, environmental effects, and engineering challenges of solar radiation modification technologies.

Proponents of plasma-based approaches suggest that solar power and naturally occurring solar-wind plasma could provide operational energy and plasma resources for such systems. However, the practical effectiveness of large-scale plasma structures for solar radiation management remains an area of ongoing research and debate.

== See also ==
- Solar sail – Space propulsion method using Sun radiation
- Space mirror – Artificial satellites designed to change the amount of solar radiation that impacts Earth
- Space-based solar power – Concept of collecting solar power in outer space and distributing it to Earth
- Spacecraft thermal control – Process of keeping all parts of a spacecraft within acceptable temperature ranges
- Starshade – Proposed occulter
- Sunshield (JWST) – Main cooling system for the infrared observatory
