= Occulting disk =

Disk used in telescopes to block a bright object

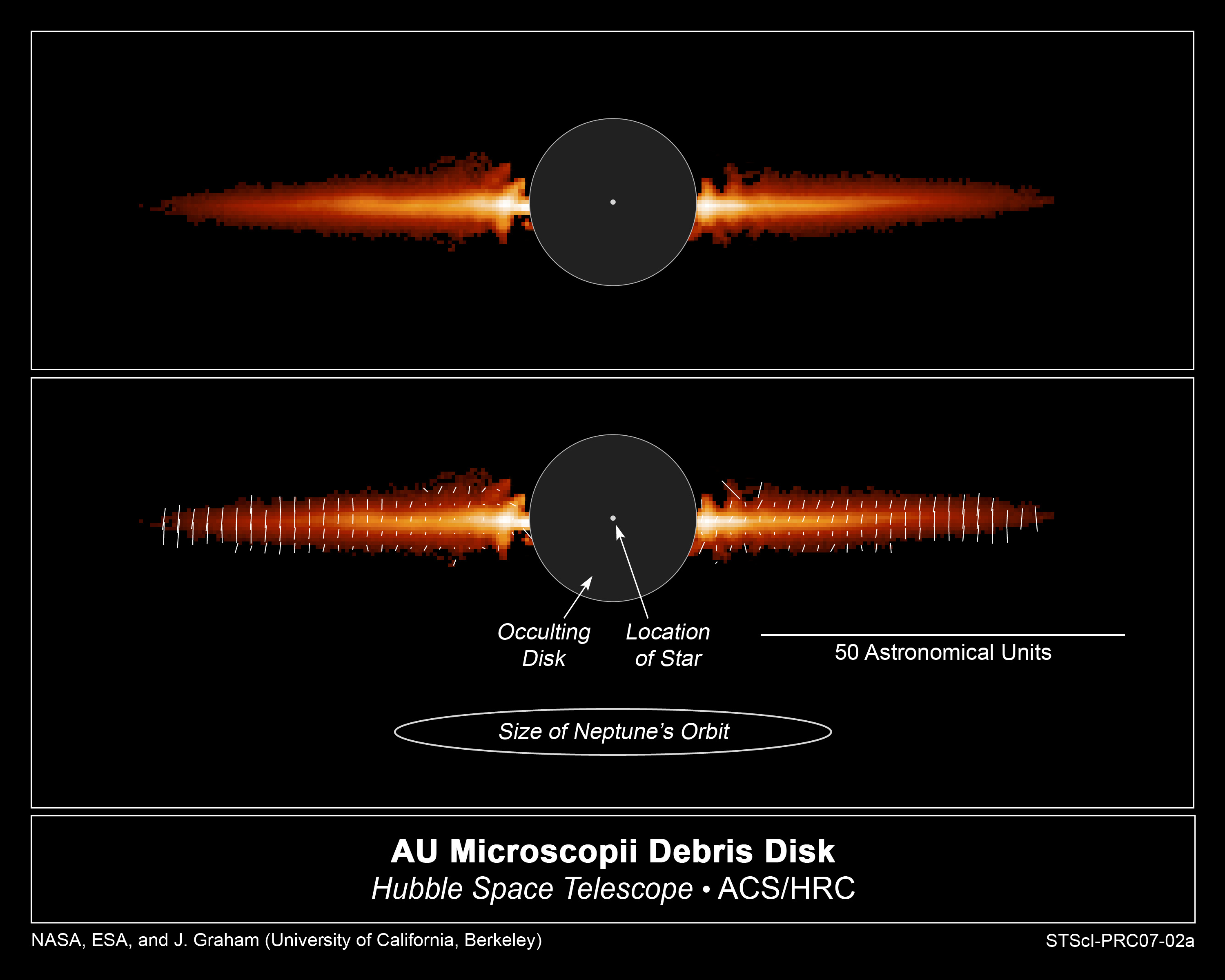
A debris disk around the star AU Microscopii. The black circle in the center is an occulting disk of a coronagraph.

An occulting disk is a small disk placed centrally in the eyepiece of a telescope or at its focal point, to block the view of a bright object so that fainter objects can be seen more easily.

In 1842, Rev. Prof. Chevallier actually described an occulting disk when he reported the design and use of a disk placed in the eyepiece of his telescope in the manner of a micrometer to create artificial solar eclipses.

The coronagraph, at its simplest, is an occulting disk in the focal plane of a telescope, or in front of the entrance aperture, that blocks out the image of the solar disk, so that the corona can be seen. Starshade is one designed to fly in formation with a space telescope to image exoplanets.

== See also ==
- New Worlds Mission
- Space sunshade
- Telescope for Habitable Exoplanets and Interstellar/Intergalactic Astronomy
